= Michigan Women's Hall of Fame =

Museum of notable women from Michigan, US

Coordinates: 42.72518°N 84.55478°W

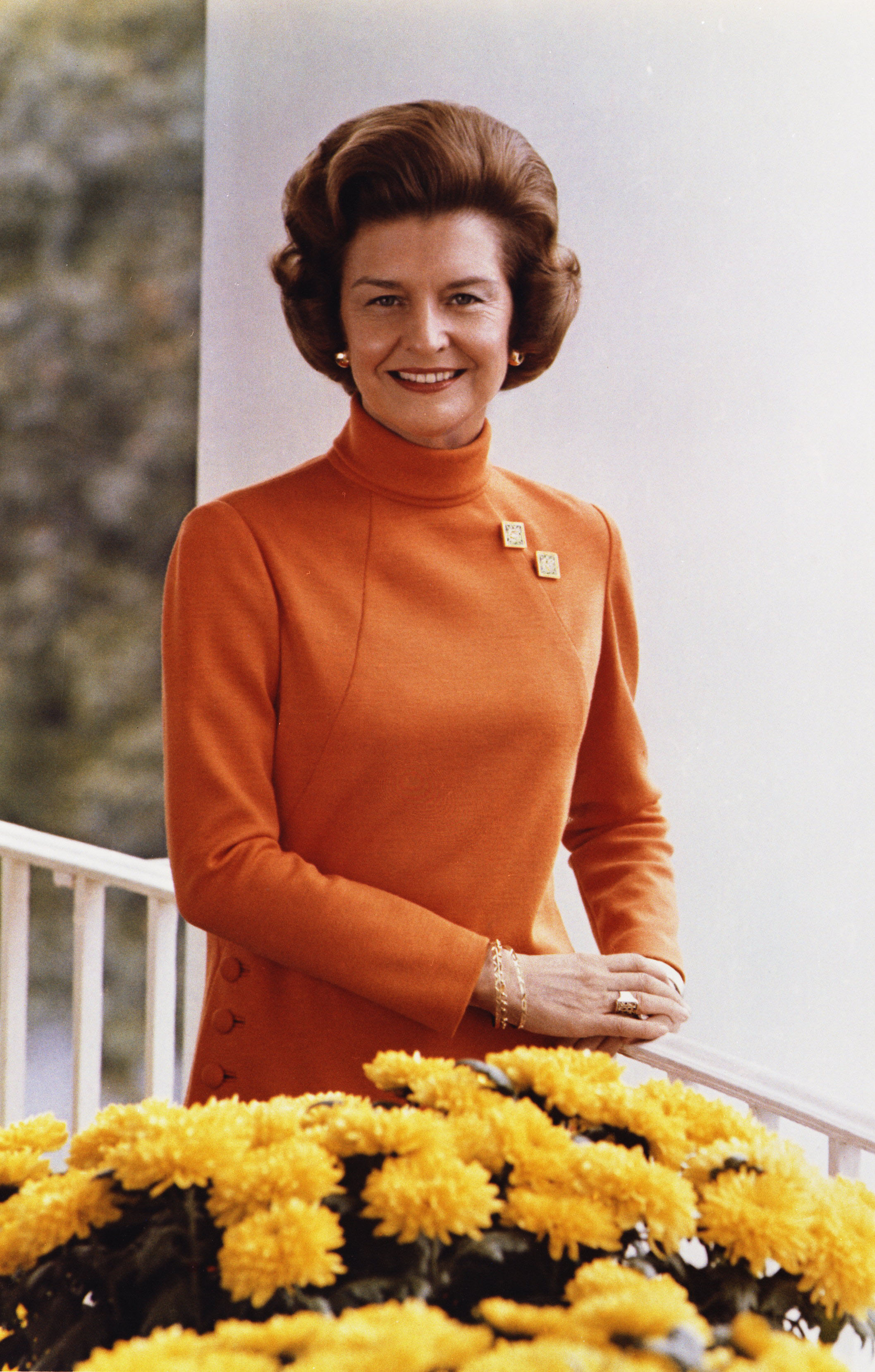
Betty Ford, First Lady of the United States and Michigan Women's Hall of Fame inductee

The Michigan Women's Hall of Fame (MWHOF) honors distinguished women, both historical and contemporary, who have been associated with the U.S. state of Michigan. The hall of fame was founded in 1983 by Gladys Beckwith and is sponsored by the Michigan Women's Studies Association. The formation of the Association and the Hall was prompted by five professors from Michigan State University, who were teaching a Women in American Society course.

Nominations to the hall of fame are accepted from the public and are open to women who rose to prominence in or were born in Michigan, as well as those who have lived in the state for an extended period. A screening committee ranks the nominations by merit and a second committee makes the final determination, generally selecting eight to ten women annually for induction. Inductees are honored at a ceremony and dinner in October and are presented with a bronze Lifetime Achievement Award. As of 2021, the Hall of Fame contains over 340 inductees.

The MWHOF was housed in the Cooley-Haze House, built in 1903 and located at 213 W. Malcolm X St. (formerly W. Main Street), directly south of downtown Lansing, Michigan. It contained a resource library, as well as exhibit galleries dedicated to preserving and presenting Michigan women's history and art. The house was opened to the public on June 10, 1987. The center also contained the Belen Gallery, which featured art from Michigan women.

Michigan Women's Historical Center and Hall of Fame moved to its current location in Meridian Mall, 110 W. Allegan St., Suite 10 in 2017.

== Hall of Fame honorees ==
Michigan Women's Hall of Fame
Name	Image	Birth–death	Year	Area of achievement	Ref(s)
Debbie Dingell		(b. 1953)	2024	U.S. representative from Michigan	
Julia Donovan Darlow			2024	First woman president of the State Bar of Michigan	
Bridget Mary McCormack		(b. 1966)	2024	President and CEO of the American Arbitration Association-International Centre for Dispute Resolution, Chief Justice of the Michigan Supreme Court	
Janice K. Means			2024	Professor emerita at Lawrence Technological University	
Anne Parsons		(1958–2022)	2024	President and chief executive of the Detroit Symphony Orchestra	
Geneva Smitherman			2024	University Distinguished Professor Emerita of English and co-founder of the African American and African Studies doctoral program at Michigan State University, founded the Malcolm X Academy	
Elizabeth Whitney Williams		(1844–1938)	2024	Lighthouse keeper	
Gretchen Whitmer		(b. 1971)	2023	Governor of Michigan	
Denise Langford-Morris		(b. 1983)	2023	Oakland County Circuit Court Judge	
Kelly Rossman-McKinney		(1954–2021)	2023	Public relations pioneer and political activist	
Traverse City Ladies Library Association		(1869–1949)	2023	Pioneer women provided community library services years before public library had secure funding.	
Esther Gordy Edwards		(1920–2011)	2022	Founder of Motown Historical Museum; first woman to serve on the 40-person board of the Central Business District Association	
Carol Sue Hutchins		(b. 1957)	2022	Head coach of Michigan Wolverines softball; winningest coach in NCAA softball history	
Mary Kramer		(b. 1953)	2022	Publisher	
Mary Locke Petermann		(1908–1975)	2022	Cellular biochemist	
Danielle Camille Woods		(b. 1981)	2022	LGBTQ Liaison for the Detroit Police Department	
Rosalind Brewer		(b. 1962)	2021	CEO of Walgreens Boots Alliance	
Debra White-Hunt		(b. 1951)	2021	Co-founder and artistic director of The Detroit-Windsor Dance Academy	
Lila Neuenfelt		(1902–1981)	2021	First woman circuit court judge in Michigan	
Fannie B. Peck		(1880–1971)	2021	National Housewives League, founded Detroit Housewives League. Created Fannie B. Peck Credit Union. Created the first cemetery for African Americans in Detroit	
Sarah Elizabeth Ray		(1917–2006)	2021	Won 1945 racial discriminatinn class action lawsuit against Bob-Lo Excursion Company	
Diana Sieger		(b. 1951)	2021	President of the Grand Rapids Community Foundation	
Najah Bazzy		(b. 1960)	2020	Detroit activist created Zaman International nonprofit to combat poverty	
Elizabeth Jackson		(1918–2020)	2020	Co-founder of Trade Union Leadership Council	
Glenda Price		(b. 1939)	2020	First African American president of Marygrove College	
Martha Teichner		(b. 1948)	2020	CBS Sunday Morning news correspondent	
Atlas Ruth Westbrook		(1941–2017)	2020	NASA's Apollo 11 project; one of the "Human Math Computers" depicted in the movie Hidden Figures	
Dorothy Zehnder		(1921–2023)	2020	Bavarian Inn Co-founder	
Margaret Kirchner Stevenson		(1920–1998)	2019	Female pilot, one of the first women to fly a Boeing B-17 Flying Fortress	
Lucile A. Watts		(1920–2018)	2019	First woman to serve on the Michigan Circuit Court	
Martha Baldwin		(1840–1913)	2019	American educator and activist	
Gilda Z. Jacobs		(b. 1949)	2019	Politician and president of the Michigan League for Public Policy	
Vernice Davis Anthony		(b. 1945)	2019	Health expert	
Terry Blackhawk		(b. 1945)	2019	Educator	
Agatha Biddle		(c. 1797–1873)	2018	Odawa fur trader	
Mona Hanna-Attisha		(b. 1976)	2018	Pediatrician whose research exposed the dangerous levels of lead in the water of Flint, Michigan.	
Clara Stanton Jones		(1913–2012)	2018	First African-American president of the American Library Association	
Angela K. Wilson		(b. 1967)	2018	Chemistry Division Director of the National Science Foundation	
Kym L. Worthy		(b. 1956)	2018	Civil rights, law enforcement	
American Legion NUWARINE Post 535			2017	Michigan's last remaining all-female American Legion post	
Ella Mae Backus		(1863–1938)	2017	First woman in Michigan to become an Assistant U.S. Attorney	
Clara Bryant Ford		(1866–1950)	2017	Wife of Henry Ford, created and funded programs benefiting women	
Lisette Denison Forth		(c. 1786–1866)	2017	Philanthropist, former slave	
Mary Kay Henry		(b. 1958)	2017	President of the Service Employees International Union (SEIU)	
Verna Grahek Mize		(1913–2013)	2017	Environmentalist whose legal battles ended dumping of mining waste into Lake Superior	
Bernice Morton		(1923–2018)	2017	Developed Affirmative Action program at Wayne State University; helped develop the first Model Cities Comprehensive Health Care Center in the U.S.	
Rosie the Riveter			2017	WWII cultural icon who appeared on numerous posters showing women at work in the war service industries	
Rosemary C. Sarri		(1926–2022)	2017	Social worker who was instrumental in the passage of the Juvenile Justice and Delinquency Prevention Act	
Elizabeth Wetzel		(b. 1964)	2017	First female design director for General Motors	
Elizabeth Sparks Adams		(1911–2007)	2016	Government, history, women's rights	
Anan Ameri		(b. 1944)	2016	Art, history, community service, writing	
Daisy Elliott		(1917–2015)	2016	Government, Civil Rights	
Faith Fowler		(b. 1959)	2016	Religion, women's rights, community service, civil rights	
Evelyn Golden		(1913–2005)	2016	Medicine, community service	
Olivia Letts		(1928–2021)	2016	Education, civil rights, community service	
Mary Free Bed Guild			2016	Charity organization begun by women in 1891 to provide medical care to those who cannot otherwise afford it	
Diana Ross		(b. 1944)	2016	Music	
Lou Anna Kimsey Simon		(b. 1947)	2016	Education, women's rights	
Charlotte Wilson		(1854–1914)	2016	Art, civil rights, education, suffrage, women's rights	
Jocelyn Benson		(b. 1977)	2015	Dean of the Wayne State University Law School	
Maxine Berman		(1946–2018)	2015	Member of Michigan House of Representatives; political consultant	
Sue Carter		(b. 1950)	2015	Episcopalian minister, television and radio journalist	
Janet C. Cooper		(1931–2002)	2015	Civil rights, education, government, law	
Mabel White Holmes		(1890–1977)	2015	Invented Jiffy mix	
Candice Miller		(b. 1954)	2015	United States House of Representatives	
Esther K. Shapiro		(1917–2016)	2015	First director of Detroit's Consumer Affairs Department	
Maggie Walz		(1861–1927)	2015	Finnish immigrant who used her subsequent education and business expertise to establish a Finnish colony in Drummond Township	
Myra Wolfgang		(1914–1976)	2015	Labor leader, women's rights activist	
Linda M. Woods		(b. 1943)	2015	Native American Grand Traverse Band of Ottawa and Chippewa Indians, United States Air Force veteran of the Vietnam War, social worker	
Elizabeth Lehman Belen		(1886–1975)	2014	Politics; second woman elected to the Michigan House of Representatives; first woman and Democrat elected from Lansing	
MaryLee Davis		(b. 1943)	2014	Michigan State University administrator and professor	
Jeanne Findlater		(b. 1928)	2014	General manager of WXYZ-TV/Detroit and vice president of ABC Television	
Dorothy A. Johnson		(b. 1940)	2014	President Emeritus of the Council of Michigan Foundations; Johnson Center for Philanthropy	
Julie Krone		(b. 1963)	2014	Thoroughbred jockey Julie Krone is the only woman to ride the winner of a Triple Crown event (the 1993 Belmont Stakes), the first woman to win a Breeders’ Cup event (2003 Juvenile Fillies), and the first woman to win a million-dollar event (2003 Pacific Classic).	
Mary Carmelita Manning		(1888–1962)	2014	Sister of Mercy order; opened the first Central School of Nursing in Michigan (the second in the country)	
Barbara Roberts Mason		(b. 1940)	2014	Politics; State Board of Education; seconded the nomination of vice presidential candidate Geraldine Ferraro	
Marylou Olivarez Mason		(1936–2019)	2014	Hispanic rights; first Hispanic woman on the Lansing Community College Board of Trustees	
Andra M. Rush		(b. 1960)	2014	Business; former chairwoman and CEO of the Rush Group Family of Companies; founded the largest Native American-owned business in the United States.	
Mary Ellen Sheets		(b. 1940)	2014	Founder of Two Men and a Truck moving company	
Lucille Farrier Stickel		(1915–2007)	2014	Environmentalist; first woman to direct a major Federal laboratory	
Elizabeth W. Bauer		(b. 1937)	2013	Advocate for the rights of people with disabilities	
Judith Levin Cantor		(1928–2022)	2013	Jewish historian, author, archivist, and exhibit curator	
Con-Con Eleven			2013	The 11 women delegates at the 1961–1962 Michigan Constitutional Convention: Vera Andrus, Ruth Gibson Butler, Anne M. Conklin, Katherine Moore Cushman, Ann Elizabeth Donnelly, Daisy Elizabeth Elliott, Adelaide Julia Hart, Lillian Hatcher, Dorothy Leonard Judd, Ella Demmink Koeze, and Marjorie Frances McGowan	
Paula Cunningham		(b. 1949)	2013	First female president of Lansing Community College	
Elizabeth Eaglesfield		(1853–1940)	2013	Businesswoman and one of the first female steamship captains on Lake Michigan	
Joan Jackson Johnson		(1948–2022)	2013	Advocate for the poor, homeless, and mentally ill	
Gladys McKenney		(1928–2023)	2013	Educator and advocate for women's rights	
Harriet Quimby		(1875–1912)	2013	Early American aviator and movie screenwriter	
Marina von Neumann Whitman		(b. 1935)	2013	Vice president of Public Affairs at General Motors	
L. Anna Ballard		(1848–1934)	2012	Medicine; Lansing's first female medical doctor.	
Gladys Beckwith		(1929–2020)	2012	Women's studies	
Patricia Caruso		(b. 1954)	2012	First woman director of the Michigan Department of Corrections	
Mary Jane Dockeray		(1927–2020)	2012	Environment	
Eva McCall Hamilton		(1871–1948)	2012	First woman elected to the Michigan Legislature in 1920	
Judith Karandjeff		(b. 1944)	2012	Women's rights	
Les Meres et Debutantes Club of Greater Lansing			2012	Formed in 1962 by African American mothers, to mentor and fund young African American women debutantes	
Mary E. McCoy		(1846–1923)	2012	Women's rights and African-American rights	
Serena Williams		(b. 1981)	2012	Tennis	
Lois A. Bader		(1933–2022)	2011	Education	
Jumana Judeh		(b. 1959)	2011	First vice chair of the Arab American Chamber of Commerce	
Marilyn Kelly		(b. 1938)	2011	67th Chief Justice of the Michigan Supreme Court	
Valeria Lipczynski		(1846–1930)	2011	Community service	
Edelmira Lopez		(1922–2017)	2011	First female president of the Lansing Mexican Patriotic Committee, and president of the Hispanic Cultural Center	
Kary Moss		(b. 1958)	2011	Civil rights, law, women's rights	
Rose Mary Robinson		(b. 1939)	2011	Law, politics	
Tricia Saunders		(b. 1966)	2011	USA Wrestling Women's Wrestler of the Year twice and the U.S. Olympic Committee Women's Wrestler of the Year three times.	
Mary Aikey		(1928–2013)	2010	Community service, education, women's rights	
Laura Carter Callow		(b. 1927)	2010	Women's rights	
Augusta Jane Chapin		(1836–1905)	2010	American Universalist minister, educator and activist for women's rights.	
Sandra Laser Draggoo		(b. 1940)	2010	Executive director of Capitol Area Transport Authority	
Annie Etheridge		(1840–1913)	2010	Civil War nurse	
Sherrill Freeborough		(b. 1947)	2010	Business	
Dorean Marguerite Hurley Koenig		(1934–2021)	2010	Education, law	
Terry McMillan		(b. 1951)	2010	Writer	
Edith Munger		(1865–1945)	2010	Environment, bird conservationist	
Cynthia J. Pasky		(b. 1959)	2010	Strategic Staffing Solutions	
Grace Lee Boggs		(1915–2015)	2009	Civil rights	
Margaret Bailey Chandler		(1929–1997)	2009	Native American rights	
Ruth Ellis		(1899–2000)	2009	Business, gay rights	
Edna Ferber		(1885–1968)	2009	Pulitzer Prize winning author whose works were adapted to movies and stage productions	
Glenda Lappan		(b. 1939)	2009	Education	
Kay Givens McGowan		(1942–2022)	2009	Native American rights, women's rights	
Elizabeth Phillips		(b. 1937)	2009	Education	
Jessica Rickert		(b. 1950)	2009	Dentistry, Native American rights	
Betty Tableman		(1922–2021)	2009	Mental health	
Marlo Thomas		(b. 1937)	2009	Community service, entertainment, women's rights	
Carol Atkins		(1923–2013)	2008	Women's rights, writing	
Patricia Cuza		(b. 1936)	2008	First executive director chosen by the Michigan Women's Commission	
Carol King		(b. 1948)	2008	Film maker. Served as an aide to Maryann Mahaffey and to US Congressman John Conyers	
Vicki Neiberg		(b. 1940)	2008	Founding member of Michigan Women's Political Caucus	
Jane Johnston Schoolcraft		(1800–1842)	2008	First known Native American writer, granddaughter of Ojibwe chief Waubojeeg	
Leta Snow		(1880–1980)	2008	Founded the Kalamazoo Symphony Orchestra, president of the Kalamazoo Musical Society	
Sister Mary Francilene Van de Vyver		(1941–2001)	2008	President Madonna University	
Mary Brown		(1935–2021)	2007	Michigan State House of Representatives	
Gertrude Buck		(1871–1922)	2007	Education	
Emma Cole		(1845–1910)	2007	Environmentalist	
Haifa Fakhouri		(b. 1945)	2007	Founder, president, and CEO of the Arab American and Chaldean Council	
Carolyn Geisel		(1862–1932)	2007	Health care, lecturer for the Battle Creek Sanitarium	
Jane Briggs Hart		(1922–2015)	2007	Aviator, women's rights. Tested for fitness to enter NASA's astronaut training program, submitting to the same physical and psychological tests administered to the Mercury 7 astronauts.	
Abigail Rogers		(1818–1869)	2007	Education, women's rights	
Kathleen Wilbur		(1953–2023)	2007	Michigan State University trustee, president Central Michigan University	
Woman's Hospital Association (Charter Members)			2007	114 women who signed a charter in 1896 to establish the Woman's Hospital Association	
Martha Strickland Clark		(1853–1935)	2006	First woman to argue a case before the Michigan Supreme Court. Orator on women's suffrage, temperance, and finance	
Mary Esther Daddazio		(1924–2015)	2006	Women's rights	
Margery Feliksa		(1925–2001)	2006	Community service	
Nancy Hammond		(b. 1937)	2006	Government, women's rights	
Viola Liuzzo		(1925–1965)	2006	Civil Rights Activist	
Marge Piercy		(b. 1936)	2006	Essayist, novelist, poet	
Dora Hall Stockman		(1872–1948)	2006	Michigan House of Representatives	
Helen Hornbeck Tanner		(1916–2011)	2006	History, Native American rights, senior research fellow at the Newberry Library in Chicago	
Margaret Chiara		(b. 1943)	2005	United States Attorney – Western District of Michigan	
Eva Lois Evans		(1935–2020)	2005	President of the Lansing Community College Foundation	
Georgia Lewis Johnson		(1930–2023)	2005	Medicine, health care	
Lida Holmes Mattman		(1912–2008)	2005	Math, science, medicine, health care	
Olivia Maynard		(b. 1936)	2005	First woman to chair the Michigan Democratic Party	
Debbie Stabenow		(b. 1950)	2005	United States Senator	
Caroline Thrun		(1897–1983)	2005	Assistant Attorney General for Michigan; drafted the 1979 Michigan School Code	
Margaret Sellers Walker		(1935–2020)	2005	First African American to head a division of the Michigan Department of Natural Resources	
Elizabeth Weaver		(1941–2015)	2005	98th Justice of the Michigan Supreme Court in 1995, named Chief Justice of the Court in 1999	
Cynthia Yao		(b. 1940)	2005	Executive director of Ann Arbor Hands-On Museum	
Geraldine Bledsoe Ford		(1926–2003)	2004	First black woman in the United States to be elected to a judgeship	
Jennifer Mulhern Granholm		(b. 1959)	2004	47th Governor of Michigan	
Lystra Gretter		(1858–1951)	2004	Director of the Detroit Visiting Nurses Association	
Florine Mark		(1933–2023)	2004	President and chief executive officer of The WW Group, Inc.	
Cathy McClelland		(b. 1954)	2004	Founder, president, and CEO of the Detroit Entrepreneurship Institute	
Constance Mayfield Rourke		(1885–1941)	2004	Author specializing in notable American figures and American history	
Mary Agnes Blair		(1909–1982)	2003	Advocate for deaf and hearing-impaired children, and special education programs	
Verne Burbridge		(1896–2005)	2003	Community service	
Nellie Cuellar		(1899–1987)	2003	Participant in the Selma to Montgomery marches; co-chair of the southwest Detroit United Citizens	
Alice Scanlan Kocel		(1920–2017)	2003	Michigan Department of Civil Rights, Liaison to the U.S. Equal Employment Opportunity Commission	
Joyce Lewis Kornbluh		(b. 1928)	2003	Educator, activist, and advocate for improving lives of working-class individuals	
Eliza Seaman Leggett		(1815–1900)	2003	Abolition, suffrage, women's rights	
Ida Lippman		(1893–1980)	2003	Law enforcement	
Marion Weyant Ruth		(1918–2004)	2003	Pioneering aviator	
Bernice Steadman		(1925–2015)	2003	Mercury 13 astronaut	
Pamela Withrow		(b. 1948)	2003	Law enforcement, first woman warden of a male correctional institution in Michigan.	
Ruth Zweifler		(1929–2025)	2003	Founder of the Student Advocacy Center of Michigan	
Hortense Canady		(1927–2010)	2002	Governor's Committee on the Status of Women, Michigan Women's Commission	
Julia Wheelock Freeman		(1833–1900)	2002	Civil War nurse with the Michigan Soldiers Relief Association	
Lillian Mellen Genser		(1920–2006)	2002	Peace movement, conflict resolution	
May Stocking Knaggs		(1847–1917)	2002	Suffrage	
Naomi Long Madgett		(1923–2020)	2002	Poet and English professor emeritus of English at Eastern Michigan University	
Lucille H. McCollough		(1905–1996)	2002	Politics	
Lana Pollack		(b. 1942)	2002	Politics	
Martha Louise Rayne		(1836–1911)	2002	Journalism	
Muriel Dorothy Ross		(b. 1927)	2002	Math, science	
Cora Reynolds Anderson		(1882–1950)	2001	The first woman, and the first Native American, to serve in the Michigan House of Representatives	
Lucile Belen		(1912–2010)	2001	Politics	
Theresa Maxis Duchemin		(1810–1892)	2001	Missionary	
Aretha Franklin		(1942–2018)	2001	Entertainment	
Francie Kraker Goodridge		(b. 1947)	2001	Track and field athletic coach	
Marian Bayoff Ilitch		(b. 1933)	2001	Co-founder of Little Caesars Pizza, owner of Detroit Red Wings, MotorCity Casino Hotel	
Mary Ellen Riordan		(1920–2010)	2001	President Emerita of the Detroit Federation of Teachers, Local 231, AFL-CIO,	
Josephine Stern Weiner		(1912–2000)	2001	Community service	
Loney Gordon		(1915–1999)	2000	Helped develop the vaccine against Whooping Cough	
Katherine G. Heideman		(1910–2003)	2000	Education	
Dauris Gwendolyn Jackson		(1933–1979)	2000	Civil rights, education	
Cornelia Groefsema Kennedy		(1923–2014)	2000	Judge, U.S. District Court for the Eastern District of Michigan and U.S. Court of Appeals for the Sixth Circuit	
Marjorie J. Lansing		(1916–1998)	2000	Education, women's rights	
Chuan-Pu Lee		(1931–2016)	2000	Math, science	
Marilyn Fisher Lundy		(1925–2014)	2000	Education	
Katharine Dexter McCormick		(1875–1967)	2000	Philanthropist, women's rights	
Kathleen N. Straus		(b. 1923)	2000	Civil rights	
Clarissa M. Young		(1922–1979)	2000	Law enforcement	
Patricia Beeman		(1925–1996)	1999	Civil rights	
Olympia Brown		(1835–1926)	1999	Religion, suffrage	
Doris DeDeckere		(1926–2010)	1999	Philanthropist, labor volunteerism	
Margaret Drake Elliott		(1904–1999)	1999	Environment	
Elizabeth Homer		(b. 1943)	1999	Women's rights	
Eleonore Hutzel		(1885–1979)	1999	Medicine, health care	
Ella Eaton Kellogg		(1853–1920)	1999	Philanthropist, nutrition, pioneer of dietetics	
Emily Burton Ketcham		(1838–1907)	1999	Suffrage	
Ardeth Platte		(1936–2020)	1999	Peace movement, conflict resolution	
Connie Binsfeld		(1924–2014)	1998	60th Lieutenant Governor of Michigan	
Hilda Patricia Curran		(b. 1938)	1998	Director of Office of Women and Work, founding member of Women in State Government, a founding trustee of the Michigan Women's Foundation	
Marie Dye		(1891–1974)	1998	Michigan State University professor who instituted many programs focused on home, the environment and nutrition	
Eleanor M. Josaitis		(1931–2011)	1998	Co-founder of Focus: HOPE	
Dorrie Ellen Rosenblatt		(b. 1948)	1998	Gerontology	
Ella Merriman Sharp		(1857–1912)	1998	Chair Michigan Federation's Forestry Committee. Chair of the Civic Improvement Committee of the Federation of Women's Clubs.	
Martha Jean Steinberg		(1927–2000)	1998	Black Radio Hall of Fame and the Rock and Roll Hall of Fame, R&B disc jockey, station owner. Ordained minister who founded the Home of Love church.	
Ruth Thompson		(1887–1970)	1998	United States House of Representatives	
Lily Tomlin		(b. 1939)	1998	Entertainment	
Ellen Burstyn		(b. 1932)	1997	Entertainment	
Marion Corwell-Shertzer		(1931–2016)	1997	President of American Women in Radio and Television, Inc.; founded the Metropolitan Detroit Chapter, National School Public Relations Association	
Four Sisters of Charity			1997	Social work	
Della McGraw Goodwin		(1931–2022)	1997	Founding chairperson of the National Center for the Advancement of Blacks in the Health Professions (NCABHP)	
Alice Hamilton		(1869–1970)	1997	Physician, research scientist, and author	
Nancy Harkness Love		(1914–1976)	1997	Director of the WW II Women's Auxiliary Ferry Squadron	
Maryann Mahaffey		(1925–2006)	1997	President of Detroit City Council 1990–1998, champion of human rights	
Sharon E. Sutton		(b. 1941)	1997	Architect, Professor Emeritus at College of Built Environments	
Matilda Dodge Wilson		(1883–1967)	1997	43rd Lieutenant Governors of Michigan, philanthropist	
Anna Clemenc		(1888–1956)	1996	Labor activist	
Waunetta McClellan Dominic		(1921–1981)	1996	Odawa rights activist who spent her career advocating for the United States government to adhere to its treaty obligations to Native Americans.	
Margaret Muth Laurence		(1916–1996)	1996	Trademark and copyright attorney	
Claudia House Morcom		(1932–2014)	1996	Founding director of Wayne County Neighborhood Legal Services	
Betsy Graves Reyneau		(1888–1964)	1996	Portrait artist, focusing on African Americans	
Carrie Frazier Rogers-Brown		(b. 1948)	1996	Medicine, health care	
Shirley E. Schwartz		(1935–2016)	1996	Chemist and senior staff research scientist at General Motors Corporation	
Joan Luedders Wolfe		(1929–2021)	1996	Founder of the West Michigan Environmental Action Council. Member of the Michigan Natural Resources Commission, and the Governor's Advisory Committee on Electric Energy Alternatives and the first Natural Resources Trust Fund Board.	
Yolanda Alvarado-Ortega		(b. 1943)	1995	Hispanic civil rights. Editor of El Renacimiento. Reporter for the Lansing State Journal.	
Irene Auberlin		(1896–1999)	1995	Founder of World Medical Relief	
Hilda R. Gage		(1939–2010)	1995	First female Chief Judge of Michigan's Oakland County Circuit Court	
Lucia Voorhees Grimes		(1877–1978)	1995	Founded the Wayne County Republican Women's Club, and devoted her life's work to women's suffrage	
R. Louise Grooms		(1902–1984)	1995	Founder of the Detroit Institute of Commerce with her own money, to train African American youiths with skills to enter the workplace	
Odessa Komer		(1925–2004)	1995	Labor leader, Vice President of the United Automobile Workers (UAW) International Executive Board 1974–1992	
Laura Freele Osborn		(1866–1955)	1995	The first woman to hold elective office in Detroit when elected to the school board in 1917	
Jacquelin E. Washington		(1931–2019)	1995	First African American woman to serve as executive director of the Planned Parenthood League of Southwest Michigan. Co-founder of the Sojourner Foundation	
Marie-Therese Guyon Cadillac		(1671–1746)	1994	Business, physician; the first white woman to cross the Iroquois Territory	
Ruth Carlton		(1911–2001)	1994	The Detroit News columnist whose work focused on adoption of hard-to-place children, resulting in government regulations.	
Flossie Cohen		(1925–2004)	1994	Professor Emeritus at Wayne State University, founded the pediatric HIV Clinic at Children's Hospital	
Bertha A. Daubendiek		(1916–2005)	1994	Environment, advocate of natural sanctuaries. Founder of the Michigan Nature Association.	
Genora Johnson Dollinger		(1913–1995)	1994	Labor leader who organized the Women's Auxiliary and the Women's Emergency Brigade sit-down strike against General Motors. Memorialized in the documentary With Babies and Banners: Story of the Women's Emergency Brigade.	
Flora Hommel		(1928–2015)	1994	Founder of Childbirth Without Pain Education Association, peace activist, advocate of universal single-payer health care	
Sarah Van Hoosen Jones		(1892–1972)	1994	First woman in the United States to earn a Doctorate in Animal Genetics. Trustee of Michigan State University. Founding member of the Oakland University Board of Trustees	
Aleda E. Lutz		(1915–1944)	1994	W W II U. S. Army flight nurse, died in a plane crash in Lyon, France. Posthumously awarded the Distinguished Flying Cross. Aleda E. Lutz VA Medical Center in Saganaw honors her service.	
Helen Walker McAndrew		(1826–1906)	1994	Washtenaw County's first woman physician	
Edith Vosburgh Alvord		(1875–1962)	1993	Volunteerism, women's suffrage	
Catherine Carter Blackwell		(1919–2014)	1993	Pioneered African-American studies in Detroit schools	
Jean W. Campbell		(1918–2016)	1993	Helped found the Center for Education of Women at the University of Michigan	
Katherine Hill Campbell		(1868–1942)	1993	Activist for prison reform	
Lenna F. Cooper		(1875–1961)	1993	Co-founder of the American Dietetic Association (ADA) in 1917; first dietician in the United States Army	
Roberta A. Griffith		(1870–1941)	1993	Helped to establish American Association of Workers for the Blind, and created a 6-volume Braille dictionary	
Bina West Miller		(1867–1954)	1993	Founder of Women's Benefit Association, a nonprofit, dues-paying organization exclusively for women, pioneering life insurance for women	
Jeanne Omelenchuk		(1931–2008)	1993	Olympic speed skater	
Sippie Wallace		(1898–1986)	1993	Musical entertainer	
Edna Noble White		(1879–1954)	1993	Founding director of the Merrill-Palmer Institute, childhood development advisor to the Franklin D. Roosevelt administration and to the Rockefeller Institute for Medical Research	
Irene Clark Woodman		(1905–1994)	1993	Military	
Cora Mae Brown		(1914–1972)	1992	Legislative work, criminal law, and women's rights	
Mary Lou Butcher		(b. 1943)	1992	Journalism	
Sarah Emma Edmonds		(1841–1898)	1992	Served with the Union troops during the Civil War, passing herself off as a man	
Violet Temple Lewis		(1899–1968)	1992	Improving the status of women through education and job skills	
Luise Ruth Leismer Mahon		(1926–1975)	1992	Journalism	
Gilda Radner		(1946–1989)	1992	Entertainer	
Martha Romayne Seger		(1932–2021)	1992	Financial Economist and Former Governor of the Federal Reserve System in Washington, D.C.	
Ann M. Shafer		(1916–1991)	1992	Became a union leader while working at Kellogg's in Battle Creek. Co-founder of the Coalition of Labor Union Women. Founded the Kalamazoo and Battle Creek chapters of the National Organization for Women	
Sylvia M. Stoesser		(1901–1991)	1992	Chemist, Dow Chemical Company's first female research scientist.	
Lucy Thurman		(1849–1918)	1992	Devoted 37 years to the Woman's Christian Temperance Union, helping them establish a National Department of Colored work	
Charleszetta Waddles		(1912–2001)	1992	Social work, African-American activist, Pentecostal church minister, and founder of Mother Waddles Perpetual Mission	
Rachel Andresen		(1907–1988)	1991	Founded Youth For Understanding	
Mary V. Beck		(1908–2005)	1991	First woman elected to the Detroit City Council, member of Wayne County Board of Supervisors	
Jan BenDor		(b. 1946)	1991	Founder of Women's Crisis Center in Ann Arbor. Organized a boycott against Domino's Pizza for its anti-woman policies. Propelled the rape crisis center movement in Michigan.	
Janet K. Good		(1923–1997)	1991	Helped establish the Older Women's League (OWL) in Michigan. Actin director of the Equal Employment Opportunity Commission for the Michigan Employment Security Commission. Co-chair the Governor's task force on sexual harassment, leading to the Elliott-Larsen Civil Rights Act.	
Jo Jacobs		(1933–2015)	1991	Organized the committee to Study Sex Discrimination in the Kalamazoo Public Schools.	
Virginia Cecile Blomer Nordby		(b. 1929)	1991	Helped draft the Michigan Criminal Sexual Conduct Act	
Dorothy Comstock Riley		(1924–2004)	1991	Chief Justice of the Michigan Supreme Court 1987–1991	
Edith Mays Swanson		(1934–1989)	1991	Civil rights, education, Edith Swanson Leadership Award established in her honor	
Emily Helen Butterfield		(1884–1958)	1990	Artist, and first licensed female architect in Michigan	
Erma Henderson		(1917–2009)	1990	First African American woman elected to the Detroit City Council	
Dorothy Leonard Judd		(1898–1989)	1990	In conjunction with the League of Women Voters, spent her life rooting out corruption and cronyism in government.	
Elba Lila Morse		(1882–1975)	1990	Superintendent of Northern Michigan Children's Clinic. Helped found the Bay Cliff Health Camp. Worked with the American Red Cross to recruit and train workers for disaster recovery.	
Fannie M. Richards		(1840–1922)	1990	Founded a private elementary school for black children. Pushed for school desegregation, resulting in the Michigan Supreme Court's 1871 ruling ordering desegregation.	
Emelia Christine Schaub		(1891–1995)	1990	First female practicing prosecuting attorney in Michigan.	
Mary P. Sinclair		(1918–2011)	1990	Authority on nuclear energy and its impact on the environment	
Merze Tate		(1905–1996)	1990	Political science scholar, author, professor at Harvard University	
Delia Villegas Vorhauer		(1940–1992)	1990	Hispanic civil rights	
Clara Arthur		(1858–1929)	1989	Co-founder of the Detroit Equal Suffrage Association in 1886	
Anna Sutherland Bissell		(1846–1934)	1989	Philanthropist and CEO of Bissell Company in 1889. First woman chief executive officer in the United States.	
Alexa Canady		(b. 1950)	1989	First African American woman in the United States to become a neurosurgeon	
Anne R. Davidow		(1898–1991)	1989	Attorney who argued for the plaintiff in Goesaert v. Cleary before the United States Supreme Court, in which the Supreme Court ruled in favor of the appellees and upheld the State of Michigan's discriminatory laws regarding hiring practices of women barkeepers. US Congresswoman Martha Griffiths' support of the US Equal Rights Amendment was based on this case.	
Bernadine Newsom Denning		(1930–2011)	1989	Human rights activist	
Isabella Karle		(1921–2017)	1989	Chemist who developed the Symbolic Addition Procedure for deriving molecular structures directly from x-ray diffraction experiments on crystals.	
Jean Ledwith King		(1924–2021)	1989	Advocate for gender equality	
Olga Madar		(1915–1996)	1989	First woman elected to the executive board of the United Auto Workers. Under her influence, the UAW in 1970 became the first national union to endorse constitutional ratification of the Equal Rights Amendment (ERA).	
Mary Anne Bryant		(1845–1903)	1989	Born in a log cabin, she worked through the National Grange of the Order of Patrons of Husbandry to improve the lives and educations of Michigan women.	
Louise Brown		(1917–2011)	1988	Social worker, educator	
Ethelene Crockett		(1914–1978)	1988	Michigan's first African-American female board-certified OB/GYN	
Marcia J. Federbush		(1934–2007)	1988	Championed gender-equal academic and sports regulations in Michigan	
Fran Harris		(1909–1998)	1988	First woman to broadcast news in Michigan	
Agnes Mary Mansour		(1931–2004)	1988	Roman Catholic nun, president of Mercy College of Detroit, 1982 candidate for Congress	
Helen Martin		(1889–1973)	1988	Michigan state geologist, prolific author	
M. Jane Kay Nugent		(1925–2021)	1988	Former Vice President of Administration at Detroit Edison	
Sarah Goddard Power		(1935–1987)	1988	Former Deputy Assistant Secretary in the State Department	
Marion Isabel Barnhart		(1921–1985)	1987	Medical researcher and first woman professor at Wayne State University (WSU); first recipient of the university's Distinguished Graduate Faculty Award	
Patricia Hill Burnett		(1920–2014)	1987	Arts, women's rights; co-founded the Michigan chapter of the National Organization for Women	
Ethel Calhoun		(1898–1989)	1987	Physician who helped pioneer the Sister Kenny method of treating Poliomyelitis	
Georgia Emery		(1867–1913)	1987	Founder of Merrill Palmer School for Motherhood and Home Training, first director of the Women's Department of the Massachusetts Life Insurance Company	
Betty Ford		(1918–2011)	1987	First Lady of the United States	
Rosa Slade Gragg		(1904–1989)	1987	Civil rights advocate appointed in the 1940s to a national advisory post by President Franklin D. Roosevelt	
Clara Raven		(1909–1994)	1987	First woman commissioned as American military Colonel, World War II Army Medical Corps, Deputy Chief Medical Examiner of Wayne County, 20 years research into Sudden infant death syndrome	
Patricia Boyle		(1937–2014)	1986	Judge, U.S. District Court for the Eastern District of Michigan	
Elizabeth C. Crosby		(1888–1983)	1986	Comparative and human neuroanatomy. 1979 recipient of the President's National Medal of Science from Jimmy Carter	
Gwen Frostic		(1906–2001)	1986	Artists, illustrator	
Elmina R. Lucke		(1889–1987)	1986	International social worker	
Marjorie Swank Matthews		(1916–1986)	1986	First woman elected as bishop to the Methodist Church	
Marjorie Peebles-Meyers		(1915–2001)	1986	First African-American woman to graduate from the Medical School of Wayne State University, the first to be accepted as an intern at Detroit Receiving Hospital. and the first to become Chief Resident of a major Detroit hospital.	
Mary Chase Perry Stratton		(1867–1961)	1986	Ceramic artist and co-founder of renowned Detroit studio Pewabic Pottery	
Helen Thomas		(1920–2013)	1986	Journalism, White House press corps	
Helen J. Claytor		(1907–2005)	1984	Civil rights, national president of the YWCA 1967–1973	
Caroline Bartlett Crane		(1858–1935)	1984	Unitarian minister, suffragist, civic reformer, educator and journalist	
Virginia Allan		(1916–1999)	1984	Chair President Nixon's Task Force on Women's Rights and Responsibilities. 1972 Deputy Assistant Secretary of State for Public Affairs	
Marguerite Lofft De Angeli		(1889–1987)	1984	Newbery Medal for children's literature	
Emma Genevieve Gillette		(1898–1986)	1984	Conservationist	
Icie Macy Hoobler		(1892–1984)	1984	Biochemist. First woman chair of a local section of the American Chemical Society. Won 22 awards and honors for her laboratory's research.	
Madeline La Framboise		(1779–1846)	1984	Early 19th century fur trader	
Martha Longstreet		(1870–1953)	1984	Physician, community activist	
Elly M. Peterson		(1914–2008)	1984	Republican National Committee co-chairman during the 1960s and 1970s	
Jessie Pharr Slaton		(1908–1983)	1984	African-American attorney	
Mary C. Spencer		(1842–1923)	1984	Michigan State Librarian 1893–1923	
Bertha Van Hoosen		(1863–1952)	1984	Medicine, health care, founder of the American Medical Women's Association in 1915, and the first woman to be head of a medical division at a coeducational university.	
Harriette Simpson Arnow		(1907–1986)	1983	Novelist	
N. Lorraine Beebe		(1910–2005)	1983	Michigan state senator	
Mamie Geraldine Neale Bledsoe		(1900–1991)	1983	Civil rights, politics, advocate for special education needs of children	
Elizabeth Margaret Chandler		(1807–1834)	1983	Quaker writer who incorporated abolitionism into her themes	
Mary Stallings Coleman		(1914–2001)	1983	First woman to be elected Justice of the Michigan Supreme Court .	
Wilma T. Donahue		(1900–1993)	1983	Medicine, health care, author, and authority on Gerontology, founded International Center for Social Gerontology (ICSG) in Washington, D.C.	
Grace Eldering		(1900–1988)	1983	Math, science, medicine, health care, along with Pearl Kendrick developed the vaccine for whooping cough	
Josephine Gomon		(1892–1975)	1983	Medicine, health care, civil activist	
Martha Griffiths		(1912–2003)	1983	United States House of Representatives 1955–1974, guided the Equal Rights Amendment through both houses of Congress in 1972. Lt. Governor of Michigan 1983–1991	
Dorothy Haener		(1917–2000)	1983	International Representative with the United Auto Workers International Union's Women's Department	
Laura Smith Haviland		(1808–1897)	1983	Quaker abolitionist who helped slaves escape, founded an orphanage, nursed wounded Civil War soldiers, and was active in women's suffrage.	
Mildred Jeffrey		(1910–2004)	1983	Labor and civil rights activist	
Pearl Kendrick		(1890–1980)	1983	Math, science, medicine, health care. Along with Grace Eldering, developed the vaccine for Whooping Cough	
Helen Milliken		(1922–2012)	1983	First Lady of Michigan, philanthropist, women's rights	
Rosa Parks		(1913–2005)	1983	Pivotal African American figure in the Civil Rights Movement	
Anna Howard Shaw		(1847–1919)	1983	Suffrage, religion, medicine, health care	
Lucinda Hinsdale Stone		(1814–1900)	1983	Women's rights	
Sojourner Truth		(1797–1883)	1983	Abolition	
