= Gomon (surname) =

Gomon is a surname. Notable people with the surname include:

- Josephine Gomon (1892–1975), American activist
- Yevgeniya Gomon (born 1995), Ukrainian rhythmic gymnast
