= Joan Wolfe =

Joan Wolfe may refer to:

- Joan Luedders Wolfe, Michigan environmentalist
- Joan Pearl Wolfe, young English woman murdered in 1942 by Canadian soldier August Sangret
