= Haener =

Haener is a surname. Notable people with the surname include:

- Dorothy Haener (1917–2001), union activist
- Jake Haener (born 1999), American football player
