= Julia Freeman =

Julia Freeman may refer to:

- Julia Wheelock Freeman (1833–1900), American missionary
- Julia Freeman (cyclist) (born 1963), English cyclist
- Julia Freeman (Arrowverse), a character in the Arrowverse franchise

== See also ==
- Julie Freeman (disambiguation)
