= Elizabeth Lehman Belen =

American politician (1886–1975)

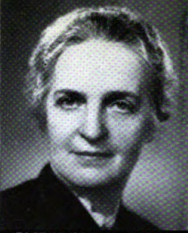

Member of the Michigan House of Representatives from the Ingham County 1st district
- In office 1937 – 1938

Personal details
- Born: December 22, 1886 Westphalia Township, Michigan
- Died: July 24, 1975 (aged 88) Meridian Charter Township, Michigan
- Party: Democratic
- Occupation: Politician

Elizabeth Lehman Belen (December 22, 1886 – July 24, 1975) was an American politician, businesswoman, and nurse. She served as a member of the Michigan House of Representatives from 1937 to 1938. She was the first Democratic woman elected to the Michigan Legislature. She was a delegate to the 1940 and 1944 Democratic National Conventions. Belen was inducted into the Michigan Women's Hall of Fame in 2014.

== Early life and education ==
Lehman was born in Westphalia Township, Michigan, the daughter of Joseph Lehman and Theresia Miller Lehman. Her father was born in Germany. She graduated from St. Mary's School of Nursing in Grand Rapids.

== Career ==
=== Community work ===
Belen was drafted by the Army during the Spanish flu outbreak of 1918. She founded the Visiting Nurses Service in the 1920s, organized a soup kitchen and a job registry for nurses, and was head surgical nurse at St. Lawrence Hospital. Belen was founder and chair of Michigan's Eleanor Roosevelt League of Women in 1932. She and her husband co-owned a flower shop, Belen's Flowers, in Lansing, beginning in 1936. She also served on the boards of the Lansing Women's Home and the Lansing Symphony Association.

=== In state government ===
Belen served as a member of the Michigan House of Representatives from 1937 to 1938. She was the second woman elected to the Michigan Legislature, after Cora Reynolds Anderson, and the first Democratic woman seated in the chamber. From 1939 to 1943 she was the vice chairman of the Democratic State Central Committee for Michigan.

In 1941 Belen was appointed to head the workers' compensation commission of the state's Department of Labor. She was a delegate to the 1940 and 1944 Democratic National Conventions. In 1948, she was president of the National Order of Women Legislators. In 1950, Belen unsuccessfully ran for a seat in the Michigan Senate. In 1958 she was appointed to a statewide commission on aging.

== Personal life and legacy ==
Lehman married businessman Christopher F. Belen in 1909. They had three children. Their son, Frederick C. Belen, was the appointed Deputy Postmaster General from 1964 to 1968. Their older daughter, Lucile Belen, served on the Lansing City Council for forty years. Her husband died in 1960, and their younger daughter died in 1964. Belen died in 1975, at the age of 88, in Michigan.

A gallery at the Michigan Women's Historical Center in Lansing was dedicated to Belen in 1987. She was inducted into the Michigan Women's Hall of Fame in 2014.
