= Sarah Van Hoosen Jones =

American geneticist

- Born: June 23, 1892
- Died: 1972 (aged 79–80)
- Education: University of Chicago, University of Wisconsin
- Organization(s): Association of Governing Board of State Universities and Allied Institutions (1944-1955), Rochester School Board (1924-1961), Michigan State University Board of Trustees

Sarah Van Hoosen Jones (1892–1972) was the first woman in the United States to earn a Doctorate in Animal Genetics. She later managed a Michigan Centennial Farm in Avon Township (later Rochester Hills), Michigan and served on the elected Board of Trustees of Michigan State University. Jones was inducted into the Michigan Women's Hall of Fame in 1994 for her accomplishments in the fields of agriculture and education.

== Early life and education ==
Jones was born on June 23, 1892, to Alice Van Hoosen and Joseph Jones on the family's farm in Stony Creek, Michigan. At an early age, her parents decided Jones would become a physician, but she longed to become a farmer. The young Jones had spent most of her childhood in Chicago but had visited the Van Hoosen Farm, often attired in overalls and high boots. Jones earned her bachelor's degree in foreign languages from the University of Chicago and a master's degree in Animal Husbandry from the University of Wisconsin. After informing her parents that medical school would not be appropriate for her, she went on to earn her doctorate in genetics from the University of Wisconsin, becoming the first woman in the United States to do so.

== Career ==
=== Work on the Van Hoosen farm ===
Two years after earning her doctorate, Jones decided to move back to her family's old farm. There, she practiced her skill in genetics on breeds of leghorn hens and various breeds of livestock including Holstein cattle. The farm began to produce certified Vitamin A and Vitamin D milk from these cattle, whose genetics had gained a fair amount of popularity as the Van Hoosen Farm began branching out into retail sales during the Great Depression. The farm was run scientifically, and earned a reputation in being efficient as well as economically progressive which eventually earned her the title of "Master Farmer" by the Michigan Farmer in 1933. Her cattle won prizes in breeding and she was awarded the title of "Michigan Premier Breeder" for a total of nine years.

=== Work in education ===
Jones had made significant contributions to civic and educational affairs and served on the Rochester school board from 1924 to 1961, earning her a local nickname as the "first lady of Rochester." She was elected for two six-year terms to the State Board of Agriculture, which was the governing board of Michigan State University. Dr. Jones was also a member and president of the Association of Governing Boards of State Universities and Allied Institutions. She made a generous contribution to Michigan State University, first by donating 350 acres of farm land, and eventually, in her will, the remainder of her property, which included a dozen houses. The MSU residence hall Van Hoosen Hall was named in her honor.
