= Chuan-Pu Lee =

American biochemist (1931–2016)

Chuan-pu Lee
- Born: 1931; Qingdao, Shandong, China
- Died: July 20, 2016 (aged 84–85); Detroit, Michigan, U.S.
- Occupations: Biochemist, college professor

Chuan-pu Lee (1931 – 2016) was an American biochemist, born in China. She was a professor of biochemistry at the Wayne State University School of Medicine from 1975 until her retirement in 2011. She was inducted into the Michigan Women's Hall of Fame in 2000.

== Early life and education ==
Lee was born in Qingdao, Shandong province, China, one of six children born to Fung-Hwa Lee and Wei-Ping Liu Lee. She earned a bachelor's degree in chemistry at National Taiwan University in 1954, and completed doctoral studies at Oregon State University in 1961, under advisor Tsoo E. King. Her dissertation was titled "Biochemical Studies of Western Ring Spot Virus". Her younger brother Chuan-kuo Lee also attended a University of Pennsylvania graduate program, in physics.

== Career ==
Lee held a postdoctoral position at the University of Pennsylvania, working with Britton Chance, and became a professor of physical biochemistry there. She was a professor of biochemistry at the Wayne State University College of Medicine beginning in 1975, with an additional appointment in the neurology department beginning in 1982. She also had a longtime association with Stockholm University, through her frequent collaborator Lars Ernster. Her research involved mitochondrial bioenergetics, or a study of how energy is produced in bodies at the cellular level. Her research was published in academic journals including Annual Review of Biochemistry, European Journal of Biochemistry, FEBS Letters, Journal of Neurochemistry, Methods in Enzymology, and Biochemistry. She retired in 2011.

In 2000 Lee was named to the Michigan Women's Hall of Fame. She established the Chuan-Pu Lee, Ph.D. Endowed Graduate Student Research Fund at Wayne State, granting funds for graduate student travel to academic conferences.

== Selected publications ==
Lee was prolific in scientific publications, with over 200 journal articles written or co-written by her. Below, a selection from the years between 1964 and 2005 gives a sense of her subjects and collaborators. She also co-edited Mitochondria and microsomes (1981), a collection of essays in honor of Lars Ernstner; and co-edited Membrane Bioenergetics (1979) and edited Current Topics in Bioenergetics 13 (1984), 14 (1985), 15 (1987) and 16 (1991).

- "Biological Oxidoreductions" (1964, with Lars Ernster)
- "Properties of mitochondria isolated from herring gull salt gland" (1964, with Britton Chance, Reiko Oshino, and George D. V. Van Rossum)
- "Stereochemistry of hydrogen-transfer in the energy-linked pyridine nucleotide transhydrogenase and related reactions" (1965, with L. Ernster, N. Simard-Duquesne, and H. D. Hoberman)
- "Energy-coupling in nonphosphorylating submitochondrial particles" (1967, with L. Ernster)
- "Studies of the Energy-Transfer System of Submitochondrial Particles" (1968, with L. Ernster)
- "Comparison of fluorescence probe and light-scattering readout of structural states of mitochondrial membrane fragments" (1969, with Britton Chance)
- Ion transport and energy conservation in submitochondrial particles" (1970, with Britton Chance and Maurice Montal)
- "Oxidation-reduction potentials of cytochromes in mitochondria" (1970, with P. Leslie Dutton and David Franklin Wilson)
- "Progressive Ophthalmoplegia, Glycogen Storage, and Abnormal Mitochondria" (1973, with Salvatore DiMauro, Donald L. Schotland, Eduardo Bonilla, Pierluigi Gambetti, and Lewis P. Rowland)
- "Neuromuscular Disorder Associated With a Defect in Mitochondrial Energy Supply" (1976, with Donald L. Schotland, Salvatore DiMauro, Eduardo Bonilla, and Antonio Scarpa)
- "Tightly coupled beef heart submitochondrial particles" (1979)
- "Reye's syndrome: salicylates and mitochondrial functions" (1984, with Margaret E. Martens)
- "Mitochondrial Encephalomyopathies" (1988, with Margaret E. Martens and Patti L. Peterson)
- "The protective role of cellular glutathione peroxidase against trauma-induced mitochondrial dysfunction in the mouse brain" (2004, with Ye Xiong, Feng-Shiun Shie, Jing Zhang, and Ye-Shih Ho)
- "Prevention of mitochondrial dysfunction in post-traumatic mouse brain by superoxide dismutase" (2005, with Ye Xiong, Feng-Shiun Shie, Jing Zhang, and Ye-Shih Ho)

== Personal life ==
Lee died in 2016, aged 84 years, at a hospital in Detroit. Wayne State University holds an annual Chuan-Pu Lee, Ph.D. Endowed Graduate Student Research Presentation Day, in her memory.
