= Judith Levin Cantor =

American historian (1928–2022)

- Born: Judith Levin; 1928; Detroit, Michigan, U.S.
- Died: July 26, 2022 (aged 93); Issaquah, Washington, U.S.
- Resting place: Clover Hill Park Cemetery, Birmingham, Michigan

Judith Levin Cantor (née Levin; 1928 – July 26, 2022) was an American historian and educator from Michigan. Cantor served as the president of the Jewish Historical Society of Michigan from 1993 to 1997, and was the editor of its journal Michigan Jewish History from 1990 to 1998. Cantor was inducted into the Michigan Women's Hall of Fame in 2013 for her contributions to Michigan history.

== Biography ==
Judith Levin was born in Detroit in 1928, the youngest of four children of Lillian Keidan Levin and economist Samuel Mordecai Levin. She was named for her grandfather, the esteemed Rabbi Judah Leib Levin of Congregation Shaarey Zedek. Levin graduated from Central High School in Detroit at the age of 16, and attended the University of Michigan, graduating in 1949. After graduating from U-M, Levin moved to Washington, D.C., where her brother Joe resided, and taught in elementary and high schools in Washington and later Gaithersburg, Maryland.

While living in the Washington area, Levin met law student Bernard Cantor, and they married in 1951. They moved to the Detroit suburbs and raised five children. Cantor was a longtime member of Congregation Shaarey Zedek, a Conservative synagogue now located in Southfield, and in created an extensive exhibit on the congregation's history in 1981. Cantor completed a graduate diploma in archival administration at Wayne State University in 1988, and became involved with the Jewish Historical Society of Michigan. Cantor wrote and curated exhibits on Michigan history for a number of institutions in the state, including hospitals, museums, and synagogues.

Cantor was honored with the Michigan 150 First Lady Award in 1987, awarded to 150 influential Michigan women in honor of the state's 150th birthday. Cantor continued her work with the Jewish Historical Society of Michigan, and in 1990 agreed to edit a single issue of the JHSM's journal, Michigan Jewish History. Cantor served as the journal's editor for over 8 years, and remained involved with the JHSM throughout her life. Michigan State University Press published Cantor's book Jews in Michigan in 2001, as part of their Discovering the Peoples of Michigan series. Cantor was inducted into the Michigan Women's Hall of Fame in 2013 for her contributions to Michigan history.

Cantor moved from the Detroit area to the Seattle suburb of Issaquah, Washington in the late 2010s. She died in Issaquah on July 26, 2022. Fellow archivist Mike Smith of the Walter P. Reuther Library described her legacy as "when it came to the history of Jewish Detroit, Judy was a force of nature."

== Publications ==
- Jews in Michigan. East Lansing: Michigan State University Press. 2001. ISBN 978-0-87013-598-9.
