= Glenda Price =

American educator

Glenda D. Price

7th President of Marygrove College
- In office 1998–2006
- Preceded by: Dr. John E. Shay Jr.
- Succeeded by: Dr. David J. Fike

Personal details
- Born: 1939 (age 86–87) Harrisburg, PA
- Education: Temple University (BS); Temple University (MS); Temple University (PhD)
- Profession: Academic officer, public administration, professor, dean, cytotechnologist

Glenda Price is an American educator and former president of Marygrove College; she was the first African-American woman to serve in this position. Price also served as the president of the Detroit Public Schools Foundation and the American Society for Medical Technology.

== Early life and education ==
Price grew up in Harrisburg, Pennsylvania. She earned her bachelor's degree in medical technology from Temple University in 1961. She later earned her Master of Science in educational media in 1969 and her PhD in educational psychology in 1979, both also from Temple.

== Career ==
Price's early career was as a cytotechnologist, looking for evidence of disease at the cellular level. She served as both a professor and assistant dean at Temple University before accepting a position as dean at the School of Allied Health Professions at the University of Connecticut. From 1979 to 1980, Price served as the national president of the American Society for Medical Technology (later renamed to the American Society for Clinical Laboratory Science), which was considered the largest professional organization for laboratory practitioners at the time. Price has been the only African American to serve as president of the organization.

Price served as the provost of Spelman College in Atlanta; through her friendship with then president Johnnetta Cole, she was offered the job and turned it down before eventually being convinced by Cole to accept the position and move to Atlanta.

Price started as president of Marygrove College in 1998. Price was the college's seventh president and the first African-American female to serve in this position. As president, her accomplishments include restarting the college's sports program and attracting a more diverse student body to the school. Price retired from Marygrove in 2006. Marygrove board member Julia Darlow cited Price for believing in "science education as a means of preparing our graduates for a technological world as well as preparing qualified science teachers who can inspire urban students."

In 2012, Price started as president of the Detroit Public Schools Foundation, a non-profit focused on providing resources on behalf of Detroit Public Schools. In April of 2016, Price stepped down as president and became "fully retired".

== Awards and honors ==
In 2002, Price was named as one of Crain's Detroit Business most influential women.

In 2015, Price received the Theresa Maxis Award from the Sisters, Servants of the Immaculate Heart of Mary for her personification of Theresa Maxis’ work.

In 2020, Price was inducted into the Michigan Women's Hall of Fame.

The American Society for Clinical Laboratory Science created the Glenda Price Diversity in Leadership Award to "promote diversity and inclusion within the Leadership Academy, and ultimately the Society" in her honor.

== See also ==
- List of African-American firsts
