= Anan Ameri =

Arab American museum director

- Born: 1944 (age 81–82); Damascus
- Occupation: Museum director
- Writing career
- Notable awards: The Detroit News Michiganian of the Year; 2005 Michigan Women's Hall of Fame; 2016; ACCESS Arab American of the Year; 2020

Anan Ameri (born 1944) is an Arab American museum director.

== Biography ==
Anan Ameri was born in 1944 to a Palestinian father and Syrian mother. She grew up in Damascus, Syria, and Amman, Jordan. In 1951, when she was six, her family permanently left their home in Jerusalem and settled in Jordan. Her mother ran a print shop in Amman while her father was Jordan’s foreign minister and the ambassador to Egypt. Ameri got a bachelor of Arts in sociology from the University of Jordan. She then attended Cairo University where she graduated with a master's degree before moving to the US and completing her sociology PhD at Wayne State University in 1974. Ameri also spent a year on a fellowship at Harvard. Ameri became politically active while at school attending her first rally aged about 11. She worked with both the Palestine Research Center in Beirut, and founded the Palestinian Aid Society of America, of which she was the director from 1980 to 1993.

Ameri moved to Detroit for her first husband. Then in 1989 she moved to Washington, D.C. Her second husband enticed her back to Detroit with a position as director of the cultural arts program in ACCESS (Arab Community Center for Economic and Social Services). Her work led to the creation of Dearborn’s Arab American National Museum. Ameri has been the museum director and went on to write. She has won a Palestine Book Award. Ameri was named the 2005 Michiganian of the Year by The Detroit News. She has since been inducted into the Michigan Women's Hall of Fame and has also been named the ACCESS 2020 Arab American of the Year.

== Bibliography ==
- The Scent of Jasmine, May 2017
- Arab American Encyclopedia 2000, editor
- The Wandering Palestinian, November 2020
