= Jessie Pharr Slaton =

American lawyer

- Born: March 27, 1908; Atlanta, Georgia, U.S.
- Died: September 1, 1983 (aged 75) near Sakhalin Island, Russian SFSR, Soviet Union
- Education: Wayne State University; University of Detroit Law School
- Occupation: Lawyer

Jessie Pharr Slaton (1908–1983) was an American lawyer. She was inducted into the Michigan Women's Hall of Fame in 1984 shortly after her death on Korean Air Lines Flight 007.

== Biography ==
She was born in 1908, in Atlanta, Georgia. In 1918, Slaton moved with her family to Detroit, Michigan. In the same city, she would receive her first job in 1933, at the Detroit City Hall, working as a secretary. This position made her one of the first African-Americans in the government of Detroit to hold a white-collar job. She left the position at the onset of World War II and promptly enrolled in Wayne State University. After graduation, she worked as a special education teacher in the Detroit Public Schools schools system. Slaton not only became heavily involved in helping black men and women, but, in 1942 over a dispute involving the Sojourner Truth Housing Project, she took up law. After nine years, she graduated at the University of Detroit Law School and worked for Detroit as a lawyer. In 1972 she was appointed the first woman to be a referee in the Recorder's Court Traffic and Ordinance Division. Six years later, she became a Common Pleas Judge in the City of Detroit, and eventually retired. After a short retirement, she chaired the State Crime Victims Compensation Board, and would work in similar capacities until her final years.

On September 1, 1983, Slaton and six of her friends were travelling to Seoul, South Korea, onboard Korean Air Lines Flight 007, for a two-week tour of the Far East. The aircraft was shot down by the Soviet Air Force after it deviated from its original planned route and flew through Soviet prohibited airspace, killing all 246 passengers and 23 crew. Slaton's remains were never recovered and a cenotaph honoring her is placed next to the grave of her husband George Henri, who predeceased her in 1975, at Elmwood Cemetery in Detroit.
