= Myra Wolfgang =

American activist (1914–1976)

- Born: Myra K. Komaroff; May 20, 1914; Montreal, Quebec, Canada
- Died: April 12, 1976 (aged 61); Detroit, Michigan, United States
- Occupations: Women's rights activist and labor leader
- Spouse: Moe Wolfgang (m. 1939; died 1963)
- Parents: Abraham Komaroff (father); Ida Ipp (mother)
- Honors: Inducted into the Michigan Women's Hall of Fame

Myra K. Wolfgang (née Komaroff; 1914 – 1976) was a Canadian-born American labor leader and women's rights activist in Detroit from the 1930s through the 1970s. She was most active in the labor movement, advocating for the working poor and women in the workforce.

== Early life and family ==
Myra K. Komaroff was born in May 1914 in Montreal, Quebec, to Lithuanian Jewish immigrants. Her parents, Abraham and Ida Komaroff (née Ipp), raised her and her two siblings in a politically engaged environment that valued independent thinking and their Jewish culture. Her parents did not emphasize religion and chose to marry in Montreal's labour temple, rather than a synagogue. Wolfgang often said she was "a union-made union maid".

In 1915, the family moved to Detroit, where her father started a business selling real estate. After World War I, he opened an office in downtown Detroit and the family moved to a larger home on Westminster Avenue. After making her way through the Detroit school system, Wolfgang studied commercial art and interior design at the Carnegie Institute of Technology. One year later, the Great Depression hit, making it impossible for Wolfgang to continue her education. In the summer of 1932, Wolfgang returned to Detroit to live with her family.

== Early career ==
In 1932, while looking for work, Wolfgang became involved at Detroit's Local 705 of the then Detroit Waiters Union. She was hired the same day, working for Louis Koenig, secretary-treasurer of the Local 705, as a receptionist. Koenig noticed her enthusiasm for the job, began to instruct her in union history and procedures, and called her "my protégée."

Wolfgang was elected to Local 705's executive board as its recording secretary in 1934. In 1936 Governor Frank Murphy recognized her for her efficient oversight of Local 705 and appointed her to the Domestic and Personal Service Department of the Michigan Employment Security Commission. In 1937, Wolfgang helped organize and participated in a successful sit-down strike at the F.W. Woolworth five-and-dime store in Detroit. This was the first store and public building strike.

== Later career ==
In the 1940s and 1950s, Wolfgang ran the Detroit Joint Council and became international vice president of the Hotel Employees and Restaurant Employees Union. After Koenig retired, Wolfgang became the Secretary-Treasurer and chief executive officer of Local 705. She was active in the enactment of the 1966 Michigan minimum wage law, which required employers to pay each employee a minimum $1 an hour.

In 1974, Wolfgang chaired and was integral to the organization of the Coalition of Labor Union Women (CLUW). More than 3,000 women came to its first meeting from over 82 labor unions across the United States. The CLUW focused on helping women become leaders in their own unions by instructing them on how to present issues and craft arguments during contract talks. Wolfgang was also a lifelong member of the National Association for the Advancement of Colored People (NAACP). She insisted on racially integrated crews created by her union's hiring hall.

== Death and legacy ==
Just before her 62nd birthday, Wolfgang died in April 1976 from a brain tumor. Nicknamed the "Battling Belle of Detroit" by Detroit's local media and championed as "the most important woman unionist in the country" by the Detroit Free Press, she devoted her entire life to the labor and women's rights movements, continuously pushing for the rights of the working class. She was inducted into the Michigan Women's Hall of Fame in 2015.

== Archival collections ==
The Myra Wolfgang Papers are held by the Walter P. Reuther Library of Labor and Urban Affairs at Wayne State University. The collection contains .25 linear feet of records relating to her work for the hotel, Motel, and Restaurant Employees Union and her involvement in the women's rights movement.

The Walter P. Reuther Library also holds the Coalition of Labor Union Women Records, which contains 88 linear feet of material documenting the group's activities from 1972 to 2001.
