= Patricia Beeman =

American human rights activist

Patricia L. Beeman
- Born: 20 September 1925
- Died: 7 May 1996 (aged 70)

Patricia L. Beeman (September 20, 1925 – May 7, 1996) was a human rights activist based in East Lansing, Michigan, who led local- and state-based efforts to fight apartheid in South Africa, and efforts in support of independence movements in Zimbabwe and Namibia. She was named to the Michigan Women's Hall of Fame in 1999 in recognition for her work in the field of civil rights.

== Southern Africa Liberation Committee ==
Beginning in 1977, Beeman and her husband, Frank Beeman, a tennis coach and director of intramural sports at Michigan State University (MSU), were central figures in the Southern African Liberation Committee (SALC) (1973–1997), a community organization and registered student organization at MSU. The Beemans were known for their efforts to share information about human rights issues in southern Africa by distributing leaflets and organizing events such as film screenings, exhibitions, and talks. SALC's efforts contributed significantly to the 1977 passage of a Selective Purchasing Resolution by the city of East Lansing, prohibiting the city's purchase of supplies from companies with operations in South Africa; the MSU Board of Trustees' 1978 decision to disinvest university funds from companies with subsidiaries in South Africa, which made MSU one of the first large universities in the U.S. to do so; and passage of laws by the state of Michigan to prohibit the deposit of state funds in banks lending money to South Africa (1979), prohibit public university and college investment in firms with South Africa operations (1982), and disinvest the state pension fund from companies with South Africa operations (1988).

Beeman's papers are archived in the Patricia L. Beeman Southern Africa Liberation Committee Collection at the MSU Libraries.
