= Odessa Komer =

American labor unionist

Oddessell J. Komer (née Creekmore) (June 29, 1925 – July 15, 2004) was an American labor unionist.

Born in Kemper County, Mississippi, Komer moved to Michigan with her family, while young. She left high school three years before graduation, to earn money for the family at the Ford Motor Company plant. She married in 1945 and left work to raise a family, but returned to Ford as an assembler in 1953, joining the United Auto Workers union. She devoted much of her spare time to the union, and became the first woman elected to an office in her local union. In 1964, she achieved an agreement that seniority would be taken into account when assigning jobs.

In 1967, Komer began working full-time for the union, as education director of its Region 1. From 1972, she additionally served on the board of trustees of Macomb Community College. In 1974, she was elected as a vice-president of the union, replacing Olga Madar. The following year, she was made head of the union's women's department, in which role she helped set up women's councils across the country. She also led a successful Supreme Court challenge which removed bars on women of childbearing age working in areas considered to be dangerous. She was re-elected to the post until her retirement, in 1991, when she was replaced by Carolyn Forrest.

Komer also served on the board of the National Organization for Women, and as a vice-president of the Coalition of Labor Union Women, and was appointed by Bill Clinton to the President's Advisory Committee for Women. In 1995, she was inducted into the Michigan Women's Hall of Fame.
