= Fran Harris (newscaster) =

American newscaster (1909–1998)

- Born: Frances Alvord; April 19, 1909; Detroit, Michigan, US
- Died: 1998 (aged 88–89)
- Education: B.A., psychology and English, 1929, Grinnell College
- Years active: 1931–1974
- Spouse: Hugh W. Harris (m. 1932)
- Children: 3

Frances Alvord Harris (1909–1998) was the first female newscaster in Michigan. Harris was the national president of the Association for Women in Communications and she chaired the Defense Advisory Committee on Women in Service.

== Early life and education ==
Harris was born in Detroit in 1909 as an only child.

== Career ==
After graduating from Grinnell College, Harris earned an advertising position with the Himelhoch Brothers in Detroit. She eventually left the Himelhoch Brothers for a radio position at WWJ where she discussed household items.

Due to cutbacks during WW2, Harris approached Harry Bannister on December 27, 1942, to ask to join the newsroom to replace the deported men. She sent an audition tape of several news stories and an interview with an available station engineer. On January 4, 1943, Harris became the first woman to broadcast news in Michigan on WWJ radio in Detroit. By 1946, she was the first woman on WWJ-TV and had the first woman-run television show in Michigan. Two years later, she received the Peabody Award for her expose on sex offenders. However, after the war ended, Harris was back in daytime programming, a show that aired at one o'clock and contained news, features, and interviews, under the title of "Women's Editor". In 1952, she received the Headliner Award from the Association for Women in Communications.

During the 1960s, she was appointed to sit on the Status of Women Commission by Governor Swainson, and was subsequently reappointed by the two following governors until 1976. In 1964, Harris moved into an upper management position with WWJ until her eventual retirement. In 1968, Harris was appointed to the Ferris State College Control Board. She later helped establish an associate degree in Child Care Administration at Ferris State University.

From 1971 until 1973, she served as national president of the Association for Women in Communications. In her last year, she was elected by the Secretary of Defense to chair the Defense Advisory Committee on Women in Service. Harris retired from WWJ in 1974.

Although she retired from journalism, Harris continued to work at I. C. Harris & Company as treasurer, and later president and CEO, until 1984. In 1986, she was inducted into the Michigan Journalism Hall of Fame. The next year, she became the first woman to win a Governor's Award from the National Academy of TV Arts and Science in Detroit. Harris was inducted into the Michigan Women's Hall of Fame in 1988.
