= Roberta A. Griffith =

American journalist and community leader

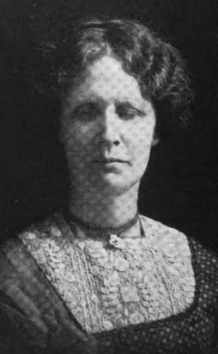
- Born: Roberta Anna Griffith; 1867 (or 1870); Pennsylvania
- Died: January 24, 1941; Grand Rapids, Michigan
- Occupation: Community leader
- Years active: 1900-1941
- Known for: Founder of Grand Rapids Association for the Blind; active in the American Foundation for the Blind, other national organizations

Roberta Anna Griffith (1867 or 1870 – January 24, 1941) was an American journalist and community leader, active in the American Foundation for the Blind and founder of the Grand Rapids Association of the Blind and Visually Impaired.

== Early life ==
Roberta Anna Griffith was born in Pennsylvania in 1867 (some sources give 1870), the daughter of Annie Griffith; she became blind in infancy. She attended the Michigan School for the Blind in Lansing, and the Ohio School for the Blind in Columbus. She was the first blind graduate of the women's college of Western Reserve University in 1891.

== Career ==
Griffith was a freelance journalist as a young woman, contributing articles and essays to newspapers, and began a six-volume "dictionary for the blind", incorporating her own ideas about simplified spelling and other adaptations. In 1900, a dam broke in Grand Rapids, damaging her home and destroying her manuscripts. Later that year, she became president of a state-wide employment bureau for blind Michigan residents, and was one of the founders of the American Association of Workers for the Blind. She was also an officer of the Michigan Blind People's Association.

Griffith helped establish a blind reading room in the Grand Rapids Public Library, and in 1913 founded the city's Association of the Blind. She led the association for almost thirty years, creating training programs and social opportunities for adults, sight-saving programs for schoolchildren, and supporting preventive care for infants. In 1919 Griffith was appointed to a newly established position, Director of Extension Education for the Blind, in the Michigan Department of Public Instruction. She also served on a scholarship committee for blind students at the University of Michigan. Later in life, she raised funds for the nursery program at the Michigan School for the Blind.

Griffith attended the 1921 meeting of the American Association of Workers for the Blind, in Iowa, and became a founding member of the American Foundation for the Blind (AFB). She worked with Helen Keller on various AFB projects, including a standardization of English-language braille. "I have tried to leader a normal life among normal people," she wrote in 1913, "and to do fully as much for others as others do for me."

== Personal life ==
Griffith enjoyed traveling alone, and visiting blind communities in other American states. She died in Grand Rapids in 1941, in her early seventies. She left her home and other assets to the Association for the Blind. She was inducted into the Michigan Women's Hall of Fame in 1993.
