= Georgia Emery =

American businesswoman (1867-1931)

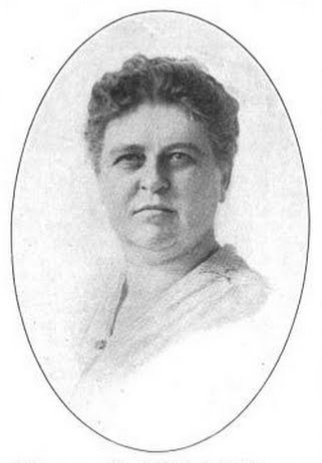
Georgia Emery (1918)

Georgia Emery (1867–1931) was an American businesswoman, known as the "Dean of American Business Women".

== Biography ==
Emery was born in 1867. She grew up in Galien, Michigan, where she would earn her first job, as a Latin teacher. She would later find employ in Benton Harbor, Michigan, working for the Benton Harbor Area Schools and would become the principal of a school in that district. Her first business venture was into selling postcards, largely penny post cards to children. In 1902, she ventured into the life insurance industry, selling life insurance to women. Two years later, she was the Women's Department Massachusetts Life Insurance Company's first director. In 1919, she worked on a survey of working women run by the YMCA, and proposed by the United States Secretary of War. The survey led to National Federation of Business and Professional Women being established. Emery was heavily involved with the group, spearheading the effort to buy a headquarters. She died in 1932. Emery was inducted into the Michigan Women's Hall of Fame in 1987.
