= Mary Anne Bryant =

American farm organizer and co-education artivist (1845–1903)

Mary Anne Bryant Mayo
- Born: May 24, 1845; Convis Township, Michigan, US
- Died: April 21, 1903 (aged 57); Michigan, US
- Known for: Patrons of Farm Husbandry
- Board member of: Michigan State Agricultural College (now Michigan State University)
- Spouse: Perry Mayo

Mary Anne Bryant Mayo (May 24, 1845 – 1903) was an American farm organizer for the Patrons of Husbandry (called the Grange). She is known for her work as part of the American Granger movement to better farm communities.

== Early life and career ==
Mary Anne Bryant Mayo was born on May 24, 1845, in Convis Township, Michigan in Battle Creek, Michigan. In 1865, she married Perry Mayo, who shared her passion for organizations that work to better the community and the individual. Both were elected to positions in the county organization in the early 1870s after becoming involved in the Patrons of Husbandry (also known as the Grange) and the creation of Farmers' Institutes. Mary Mayo in particular developed into a very active and successful Grange organizer where she held positions as the head of the woman's labor committee, and the state Grange chaplain starting in 1891.

In her position, she founded the "Fresh Air" program, which involved bringing urban impoverished children to stay in Granger houses for weekends in the country. Over time, she organized the gathering of women here and she delivered lectures on courses in line with the Farmers' Institute framework. After more than 10 years of struggle, she secured the establishment of a women's department (1897) in its own building (1900) at Michigan State Agricultural College (now Michigan State University). A women's dormitory was named after her in 1931.

In 1989, she was posthumously inducted into the Michigan Women's Hall of Fame.
