= Carolyn Forrest =

Former American labor union leader

Carolyn Forrest (born July 29, 1932) is a former American labor union leader.

Born in Paris, Tennessee, Forrest moved to Michigan with her husband in 1953. She began working at the J. R. Winter Company in 1957, where she organized colleagues to join the United Auto Workers. In 1967, she began working for the union, becoming its first woman servicing representative. In 1977, she was appointed to the union's headquarters staff as an administrative assistant, and then in 1993 she won election as a vice-president of the union.

Forrest was a founder member of the Coalition of Labor Union Women. In 1995, she was elected as a vice-president of the AFL-CIO, succeeding Odessa Komer. She retired in 1998.
