= Edith Munger =

American bird conservationist

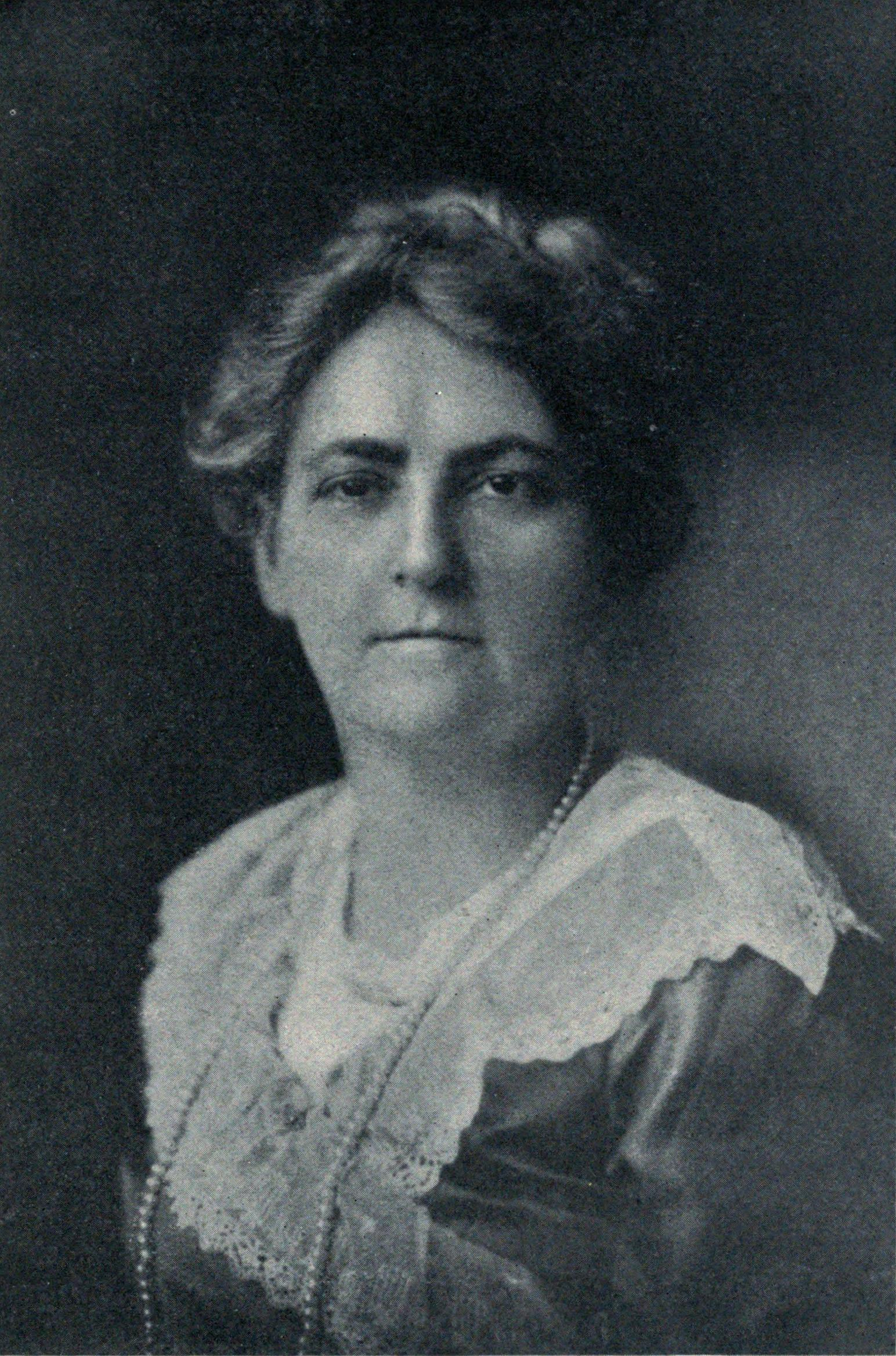
Portrait c. 1917

Edith Cushnay Munger (November 18, 1865 – 1945) was an American bird conservationist and served as the first woman to serve as president of the Michigan Audubon Society in 1911. She was known during her lifetime as the "Bird Woman" and campaigned for bird protection and helped repeal a law pushed by chicken farmers that provided a bounty to those who shot hawks and owls.

Cushnay was born in Hart, Michigan on November 18, 1865, to Louis and Sarah (Tracy) Cushnay, graduated from Whitehall High School in 1881 and trained as a nurse. She married Louis Munger (1871–1958), a local doctor of repute, in August 1895 and they had one son. Munger taught for seven years at a local school and then travelled across schools and campaigned for bird protection. She worked to get women to give up using plumes except those of the ostrich or of chicken. She also coordinated a campaign for the establishment of a state bird for Michigan. A vote was held in 1929, 190000 citizens participated and the American Robin was chosen. Munger worked to acquire land and establish a public park in the city of Hart. She also supported women's suffrage and supported the birth control movement. She was added to the Michigan Hall of Fame for Women in 2010.
