= Mary C. Spencer =

American librarian (1842–1923)

Mary Clare Spencer (1842 – August 22, 1923) was an American librarian. She was inducted into the Michigan Women's Hall of Fame in 1984.

== Biography ==
Spencer was born in 1842, in Pontiac, Michigan, to her father John A. Wilson. She married Clinton Spencer, a soldier in the American Civil War, in 1863. The Library of Michigan appointed her an assistant librarian in 1885, following her move from Ypsilanti, Michigan, to Lansing, Michigan. The library subsequently made her the head librarian on March 3, 1893, making Spencer the first Michigan State Librarian born outside of New England.

Spencer was a very progressive librarian, allowing access to the general public when previously it had been restricted to state officials. She grew the general library from 60,000 volumes to 300,000 volumes. In additional efforts to open the library to the public, Spencer created a system of associate libraries (eventually totaling 60) in where a person could place a request for books from the State Library, and they would be shipped to the local library.

In 1895, Michigan was the second state to create a system of traveling libraries, of which Spencer was a large proponent. Largely through her efforts, by 1902 there were over 700 traveling libraries with over 170,000 volumes. The program of traveling libraries, though eventually discontinued led to about 20 cities in Michigan creating public libraries. While still serving the library, she died on August 22, 1923. Spencer was awarded an honorary M.A. from the University of Michigan in 1905, and an honorary Master of Pedagogy from the Ypsilanti State Normal School. Spencer created the Art and Music, and Genealogy departments at the library and the Documents, and Michigan Collections.
