= Elizabeth Sparks Adams =

American historian

- Born: December 12, 1911; Romeo, Michigan, U.S.
- Died: October 11, 2007 (aged 95); Waterford, Michigan, U.S.
- Education: University of Michigan (MA)
- Occupations: Historian and non-fiction writer
- Known for: First woman president of the Michigan Historical Commission
- Honors: Michigan Women's Hall of Fame, 2016

Elizabeth Sparks Adams (December 12, 1911 – October 11, 2007) was an American historian. She served for 54 years on the Michigan Historical Commission, making her the longest-serving public official in Michigan history, and the first woman president of the commission. She was inducted into the Michigan Women's Hall of Fame in 2016.

== Biography ==
Adams was born on December 12, 1911, in Romeo, Michigan. She later graduated from Pontiac High School at 19, and four years later graduated from Eastern Michigan University. She graduated with an M.A. from the University of Michigan the following year. She was the first curator of the Michigan Historical Collections from 1938 to 1939. In 1936, she married Donald E. Adams. Adams was elected a Justice of the Peace in Waterford seven years after marrying Donald Adams, and in 1954 was elected to the Waterford Township Board of Education for two terms, later serving as president of the board for two years. She served on the Michigan Historical Commission for 54 years after her appointment by Murray Van Wagoner on March 20, 1941. During her service there, she was president for fourteen years and vice president for two years, serving until stepping down in 1995. Adams was president of the Historical Society of Michigan and the Oakland County Pioneer and Historical Society.

== Publications ==
- Out of Small Beginnings, a Bicentennial Historical Sketch of Oakland County, MI, 1815–1976

Contributed to

- Encyclopedia Britannica
- Biographical Directory of the Governors of the United States
- The University of Michigan, an Encyclopedic Survey.
