= Bernadine Newsom Denning =

American educator and civil rights activist

- Born: Bernadine Newsom; 1930; Detroit, Michigan
- Died: January 11, 2011 (aged 80–81); Port St. Lucie, Florida
- Occupation: Educator
- Spouse: Blaine Denning

Bernadine Newsom Denning (1930 – January 11, 2011) was an educator and civil rights activist recognised in the Michigan Women's Hall of Fame.

== Biography ==
Denning née Newsom was born in 1930 in Detroit. At the age of 16, she taught swimming at the Lucy Thurman branch of the Detroit YWCA. In 1951, she began work as a physical education teacher in Detroit public schools; she retired as assistant superintendent for community relations. She was also assistant professor of education at the University of Michigan. She served on the board of trustees for Central Michigan University.

Denning was director of the Title IV office for Detroit public schools and director of the human rights office for the city of Detroit. She was named director of the Office of Revenue Sharing for the United States Department of the Treasury by president Jimmy Carter. From 1975 to 1977, she was a member of the Michigan Women's Commission, also serving as vice-chair from 1976 to 1978, being appointed to chair in 1981 by governor William Milliken and serving until 1987. She was national vice-president and chairperson for the YWCA Convention, national vice president for the National Council of Negro Women and national project chairperson of Delta Sigma Theta.

In 1989, she was named to the Michigan Women's Hall of Fame. She also received the National Lifetime Achievement Award from the American YWCA. As well as the Detroit Urban League's Distinguished Warrior Award, and the Spirit of Detroit Award.

Denning married basketball player Blaine Denning around 1957. The couple moved to Florida around 2001.

She died at age 80 after suffering a heart attack at home in Port St. Lucie, Florida.
