= Helen Hornbeck Tanner =

American historian (1916–2011)

- Tanner, c. 1980s
- Born: July 5, 1916; Northfield, Minnesota, U.S.
- Died: June 15, 2011 (aged 94) near Beulah, Michigan, U.S.
- Education: Swarthmore College; University of Florida; University of Michigan
- Occupations: Historian, author
- Notable work: Atlas of Great Lakes Indian History

Helen Hornbeck Tanner (July 5, 1916 – June 15, 2011) was an American advocate of Native American rights and a historian. She argued for Native Americans in court cases, and she documented the tribes of the Great Lakes in 1987. Tanner was inducted into the Michigan Women's Hall of Fame in 2006.

== Personal life and education ==
Tanner was born on July 5, 1916, in Northfield, Minnesota. She spent most of her childhood in Kalamazoo, Michigan. She graduated from Swarthmore College in 1937 with honors. Tanner earned a master's degree in Latin American History from the University of Florida in 1948. She married the psychologist Wilson Tanner in 1940 and they had four children. While living in Ann Arbor, Michigan, Tanner earned a PhD in history from the University of Michigan in 1961. Tanner started studying the history of Native Americans in the early 1960s when she read tribe maps that had "insufficient data" or "unknown tribes".

== Career ==
Beginning in 1962, Tanner was a part of 16 Indian Claims Commission cases as an expert witness. Among such cases, Tanner worked in the case United States v. the State of Michigan to support the rights of Native Americans in fishing from the Great Lakes. Tanner summarized historical information about Native Americans and their fishing. Although her work was not often highly thought of by male historians and anthropologists, she was known as an authority on and friend of the Ojibwe and Odawa people who make their homes by the Great Lakes.

Tanner was a part of the University of Michigan's Center for Continuing Education for Women for four years. While working there as an associate director and then a director, Tanner helped about 2,000 women. She created a fellowship program for American Indian women. She was an instructor at the University of Michigan and was a senior research fellow at the Newberry Library in Chicago. From 1984 to 1985, Tanner was the interim director at D'Arcy McNickle Center for American Indian History at the Newberry Library. She was a member of the American Society for Ethnohistory. Tanner was placed in the Michigan Women's Hall of Fame in 2006 "for achievement in history and American Indian rights".

Tanner was given a National Endowment for the Humanities grant which allowed her to complete the Atlas of Great Lakes Indian History. The atlas was published in 1987. Margaret Ramirez of the Chicago Tribune said that it was "hailed as the most comprehensive study of the region's Indian tribes". Tanner also wrote books about the Caddo, the Ojibwe, and Spanish Florida in the early 18th century.

While in her 80s, Tanner was a part of the major case Minnesota v. Mille Lacs Band of Chippewa Indians at the Supreme Court of the United States in 1999. The case involved Ojibwe people being mistreated for more than a century for hunting, fishing, and gathering in land that was theirs via treaty rights. The case was ruled in favor of the Ojibwe.

== Death ==
Tanner died on June 15, 2011, due to heart failure at 94 years old near Beulah, Michigan.
