= Marion Corwell-Shertzer =

American creative professional

Marion Corwell-Shertzer

Marion Corwell-Shertzer (July 1, 1926 – February 22, 2016) was an American creative professional.

For her work on educational programming for the Henry Ford Museum and Greenfield Village, according to Michigan Women Forward, she may be the first woman in the United States to write, produce, and star in her own syndicated television series. She was the first woman in the management of the Ford Motor Company's public relations staff, getting hired in 1966. Eight years later, Shertzer was promoted, becoming the highest-ranking woman at Ford as their personal planning manager.

She also spent time as a member of the Michigan Women's Commission, the Andrews University Board of Trustees, and president of American Women in Radio and Television.

== Early life ==
Marion Peterson was born on July 1, 1926, to Andrew Peterson and his wife. She attended Battle Creek Academy as a child.

Peterson spent a year in Tokyo in 1951 through the University of California. She also attended Michigan State University and received MA and BA degrees in Communication Arts. She later received an honorary doctorate in Humane Letters from Andrews University. Corwell-Shertzer completed other work in Human Relations at the University of Chicago and Finance at the Wharton School at the University of Pennsylvania. She was later accredited by APR, the Public Relations Society of America.

== Career ==
Known professionally as Marion Corwell, she spent 1954 to 1962 working for the Henry Ford Museum and Greenfield Village, where she was involved in the directing, acting, producing or writing of almost 200 educational programs, which were broadcast on television around the nation. According to Michigan Women Forward, she may be the first woman in the United States to write, produce, and star in her own syndicated television series. After this, she was director of school relations at Dearborn Public Schools. While working there, in 1964 she founded the Detroit chapter of the National School Public Relations Association, serving as the chapter's first president for two years.

Corwell found work at the Ford Motor Company in 1966, when she was hired to work in management in their public relations department, making her the first woman to do so. Eight years later, Shertzer was promoted, becoming the highest-ranking woman at Ford. Serving as Ford's personnel planning manager, she promoted gender neutral job titles, a move that was repeated across the American auto industry. She later became electronics communication planning manager.

In 1968, Corwell joined the Andrews University Board of Trustees, and the next year she began a one-year term as the president of American Women in Radio and Television. During her eight years on the Michigan Women's Commission, she held public "Speak-Out" forums for women to discuss abuse and other problems they experienced. She left Andrews University in 1978, concluding ten years as the board's only female member. Corwell-Shertzer held role on the Defense Advisory Committee on Women and Sciences from 1982 to 1984.

Corwell left Ford in 1985 to found a communications company, MECA international.

== Awards ==
Marion Corwell-Shertzer received the Women in Radio and Television Lifetime Achievement Award, Association for Women in Communications Headliner Award, Michigan State University Distinguished Alumni Award, and the John W. Armstrong Community Service Award. She was inducted into the Broadcasters Wall of Fame, MI Historical Society, and Michigan Women's Hall of Fame.

== Personal life ==
In 1967, she was married to William J. Shertzer. She had married before Shertzer, and had one daughter, Ann, from that marriage.
