= Eva Lois Evans =

American educator (1935–2020)

- Eva Lois Evans, from a 1976 newspaper
- Born: January 14, 1935; Memphis, Tennessee
- Died: July 20, 2020 (aged 85); Ohio
- Other names: Eva Lowe Allman (1940 census)
- Occupation: Educator
- Known for: 24th international president of Alpha Kappa Alpha (1994–1998)

Eva Lois Allmon Evans (January 14, 1935 – July 20, 2020) was an American educator based in Lansing, Michigan, and the 24th international president of the Alpha Kappa Alpha sorority. She was inducted into the Michigan Women's Hall of Fame in 2005.

== Early life ==
Eva Lois Allmon was born in Memphis, Tennessee and raised in Detroit, Michigan, the only child of Exzelma Lowe Allmon. Her father worked for the post office. She graduated from Detroit's Northern High School. She earned a bachelor's degree at Wayne State University in 1961, and a master's degree and a Ph.D. at Michigan State University. Her 1977 dissertation was titled "Teacher Perceptions and Expectations of the Locus-of-Control and Level of Aspiration of Upper Level Elementary White and Black Students; and Student Self-Ratings of Locus-of-Control and Level of Aspiration".

== Career ==
Evans taught school in Lansing, Michigan, and was active in the racial desegregation of Lansing's schools. She was the first woman to serve as Deputy Superintendent of the Lansing Public Schools. She retired from the district in 1995. "I love the Lansing Schools, I do," she said in 2018. "I don't know that I did everything right, but I did the best I could, for as long as I could."

Evans was elected first vice president in 1990 of Alpha Kappa Alpha, and became the 24th international president, serving as the sorority's executive from 1994 to 1998. She was inducted into the Michigan Women's Hall of Fame in 2005. In 2008, she gave an oral history interview to The HistoryMakers, a centennial program of Alpha Kappa Alpha.

In 1985, Evans was appointed by governor James Blanchard to the Michigan Civil Rights Commission. In 1991 Evans received the ATHENA Leadership Award from the Lansing Regional Chamber of Commerce. and to the state's Council for the Humanities. Later in life, she was founder and president of a retirement community in Winston-Salem, North Carolina.

== Personal life and legacy ==
Eva Lois Allmon married Howard Evans in 1964. She died in 2020, aged 85 years, in Ohio. The Dr. Eva L. Evans Welcome Center in Lansing was named in her honor in 2018. Lansing Community College offers the Eva L. Evans Education Scholarship for students in education.
