= Cynthia Yao =

American museum director (born 1940)

Cynthia Yao (1940-) is the founder and former executive director of the Ann Arbor Hands-On Museum.

== Early life ==
Yao was born in Kingston, Jamaica to parents who immigrated from China. She attended Emmanuel College in Boston, where she met her future husband, Edward York-Peng Yao. In 1979 she earned a Master of Museum Practice from the University of Michigan.

== Career ==
Inspired by hands-on science centers like the San Francisco Exploratorium, Yao decided to start a children's museum in Ann Arbor. She and fellow volunteers worked to transform the city's former fire station into the Ann Arbor Hands-On Museum, which opened in 1982.

== Awards ==
Yao was inducted into the Michigan Women's Hall of Fame in 2005.
