= Delia Villegas Vorhauer =

Latina American social worker and blindness advocate

- Born: Delia Villegas; April 17, 1940; El Paso, Texas
- Died: June 1, 1992 (aged 52); Las Cruces, New Mexico
- Other name: Delia Vorhauer
- Occupations: social worker, Hispanic activist, disabilities activist
- Years active: 1967–1990

Delia Villegas Vorhauer (April 17, 1940 – June 1, 1992) was an American Latina social worker, who successfully ran programs to assist the Hispanic communities in Illinois, Ohio and Michigan. She was awarded a presidential medal for her efforts in development. She founded Mujeres Unidas de Michigan as an advocacy group for Spanish-speaking women and as a result of their activism the group sent six delegates to the 1977 National Women's Conference, which was a part of the UN International Women's Year programs. Vorhauer served as vice chair of the delegation to the conference. She authored the Mason Miller Report, an evaluation of minorities and higher education, which became the model for analyzing participation of minorities in colleges and universities throughout Michigan, leading to a state bi-lingual education law. When she lost her sight, due to diabetes, Vorhauer became an advocate for the blind. She was inducted into the Michigan Women's Hall of Fame in 1990, the first Latina to be honored in the hall.

== Early life ==
Delia Villegas was born on April 17, 1940, in El Paso, Texas to Consuelo (née Olivares) and Bernardo Villegas. Her father was an optometrist, as had been his father, and the couple raised their two older sons and Delia, as well as their adopted daughter Rebecca in the traditions of their Mexican heritage. Villegas attended Catholic school across the border in Juarez, Mexico. At the age of thirteen, based on the family history and her perusal of her father's medical books, Villegas diagnosed herself with diabetes, which the family physician confirmed. She attended El Paso High School, becoming the editor of the school newspaper, The Tatler. Upon her graduation, Villegas moved to Chicago, where the family had relatives and enrolled Rosary College, in nearby River Forest, Illinois in 1958. She graduated with a bachelor's degree in sociology in 1962.

== Career ==
Upon graduation, Villegas began her career as a social worker in the children's services department for Chicago working with adoptions and protective services. She also published a weekly column, Servicio Social in the local Spanish newspaper. In 1964, when the Manpower Development and Training Act (MDTA) was expanded to include training and development programs for the non-English speaking population, Villegas was hired as a director of the program by the Archdiocesan Latin American Committee (ALAC) to help them implement services in the Chicago area. Besides giving vocational training and English lessons, the ALAC provided family and financial counseling services, as well as medical referral information. Special programs were also provided to target Chicago's Puerto Rican populations, providing them with adult language courses. In 1967, Villegas was one of five women out of fifty-two speakers called to testify before President Lyndon B. Johnson's Cabinet Committee Hearing on all aspects of life, except the draft and women's issues, impacting the Hispanic community in the United States. That same year, she was recognized with a presidential medal for directing the most successful MDTA program in the United States.

On June 22, 1968, Villegas married William Federico Vorhauer and the couple relocated to Cambridge, Massachusetts, where her husband was completing his graduate studies. Vorhauer to help put him through school, as the director of the Hispanic Affairs Division of the Boston Community Development office. She developed a store-front school for inner-city youth in Boston and coordinated the first "city-wide conference on Puerto Rican affairs". The following year, the couple moved to Bowling Green, Ohio, where Vorhauer worked as the State Supervisor of the Migrant Reception Centers for the Ohio Bureau of Employment Services, where she focused on migrants' relocation issues. In 1972, she returned to school to work on her master's degree and began working as the Director of the Mexican-American Project at Bowling Green State University. Completing her MA in sociology in 1974, she was hired by the Michigan Department of Education as a higher education consultant and the couple relocated to Lansing, Michigan.

In 1975, after attending a statewide conference for Latina women, Vorhauer founded Mujeres Unidas de Michigan (MUM) (United Women of Michigan) as an advocacy group to support women, and was elected its chair in 1978. That same year, she was appointed by Governor William Milliken to serve on the Michigan Women's Commission, becoming both a member of the planning committee for the United Nations' International Women's Year program and vice-chair of the Michigan delegation to the national conference. As a result of their outreach to promote Latina women to leadership roles, MUM sent six members in the delegation of forty-eight Michigan women to attend the 1977 National Women's Conference in Houston, Texas. In 1976, Vorhauer authored the Mason Miller Report, an evaluation of minorities and higher education, which became the model for analyzing participation of minorities in colleges and universities throughout Michigan. The report became the basis of a bi-lingual education law passed by the Michigan state government in 1978, and garnered Vorhauer coverage as one of eleven women "Making It Happen" in the March 1978 issue of Redbook.

Vorhauer had by that time lost 90% of her sight from diabetic complications. In 1980, the same year she received a Diana Award in recognition of her community service dedication, she underwent surgery in hopes of restoring some of her vision. Though the surgery was unsuccessful, she returned to work as a program coordinator at the Michigan Rehabilitation Services, which assists citizens with disabilities in attaining self-sufficiency. Vorhauer traveled the state, establishing referral offices until 1988, when kidney failure forced her into retirement and dialysis. Within the year, she returned to work, accepting the vacated position of the chair of the Michigan Commission for the Blind, the first Hispanic to hold the post. Establishing a large-print newspaper, she also founded a support group for blind Catholics to attend Mass together, while heading the commission and over one hundred employees. In 1990, Vorhauer was inducted into the Michigan Women's Hall of Fame, the first Latina the organization had honored. Soon after the recognition, she retired and moved with her husband to Las Cruces, New Mexico, where her brother lived.

== Death and legacy ==
Vorhauser died on June 1, 1992, in Las Cruces, New Mexico. Mujeres Unidas de Michigan spawned another organization of Latina women, the Hispanic Women's in the Network, which worked to meet the needs of younger Latina women.
