= Gladys Beckwith =

American women's studies academic (1929–2020)

- Born: 1929; Flint, Michigan, U.S.
- Died: December 8, 2020 (aged 91); Lansing, Michigan, U.S.
- Employer: Michigan State University
- Organization: Michigan Women's Hall of Fame

Gladys Eloise Beckwith (1929 – December 8, 2020) was an American academic and women's rights activist. She was the co-founder of the Michigan Women's Studies Association and the founder of the Michigan Women's Hall of Fame. Beckwith was one of the first professors of women's studies in the United States, teaching at Michigan State University. She was inducted into the Michigan Women's Hall of Fame in 2012 for her accomplishments in the fields of education and women's rights.

== Early life and education ==
Beckwith was born in 1929, in Flint, Michigan. She held a B.A. and M.A. in English and a Ph.D. in Education from Michigan State University. MSU then hired her in 1967 to teach in the Department of American Thought and Language (now the Department of Writing, Rhetoric and American Culture in the College of Arts and Letters). She retired in 1999 after 32 years.

== Michigan State University Women's Studies ==
In early 1970, she lobbied for, and with several other MSU faculty, established the women's studies discipline at MSU, focused on women in America. One of the first courses in the program was called "Women in America," focused on national figures such as Susan B. Anthony and Elizabeth Cady Stanton.

== Michigan Women's Studies Association ==
In 1973, MSU Women's Studies department founded the Michigan Women's Studies Association so that those doing research on female authors and historical figures could more easily share their work. With sponsorship of the association, Beckwith then founded Michigan Women's Hall of Fame, of which she was the unpaid Executive Director for more than 30 years.

== Death ==
Beckwith died from COVID-19 in Lansing, Michigan, on December 8, 2020, at the age of 91.

== Awards ==
- 1996 - Michigan State University Presidential Award for Community Service
- 1998 - Women of Achievement and Courage Award, by the Michigan Women's Foundation
- 2005 - Michiganians of the Year, one of twelve, by The Detroit News
