= May Stocking Knaggs =

American suffragist

Mariette/Marietta/May Stocking Knaggs (1847–1915) was an American suffragist, a friend of Susan B. Anthony. She was inducted into the Michigan Women's Hall of Fame.

== Biography ==
Knaggs was born in 1847, in Penn Yan, New York, the daughter of Dr. Charles Giles Stocking and Mary Woodhull. In 1869 she married John Wesley. She lived the majority of her life in Bay City, Michigan. She wrote frequently in the Bay City Tribune, and was one of the first women on the Board of Education. A friend of Susan B. Anthony, the two frequently traveled together, including making a lecture tour of New York in 1894, where they gave a series of sixty speeches. The following year, she was elected president of the Michigan Equal Suffrage Association, which she would lead for two years; in addition, she chaired the press division of the National Women's Relief Corps. She corresponded frequently with Clara Arthur, and was on the boards of Michigan Industrial Home for Girls in Adrian, and of the Home Industry for Discharged Prisoners in Detroit.
