= Margaret Kirchner Stevenson =

American pilot and educator (1920–1998)

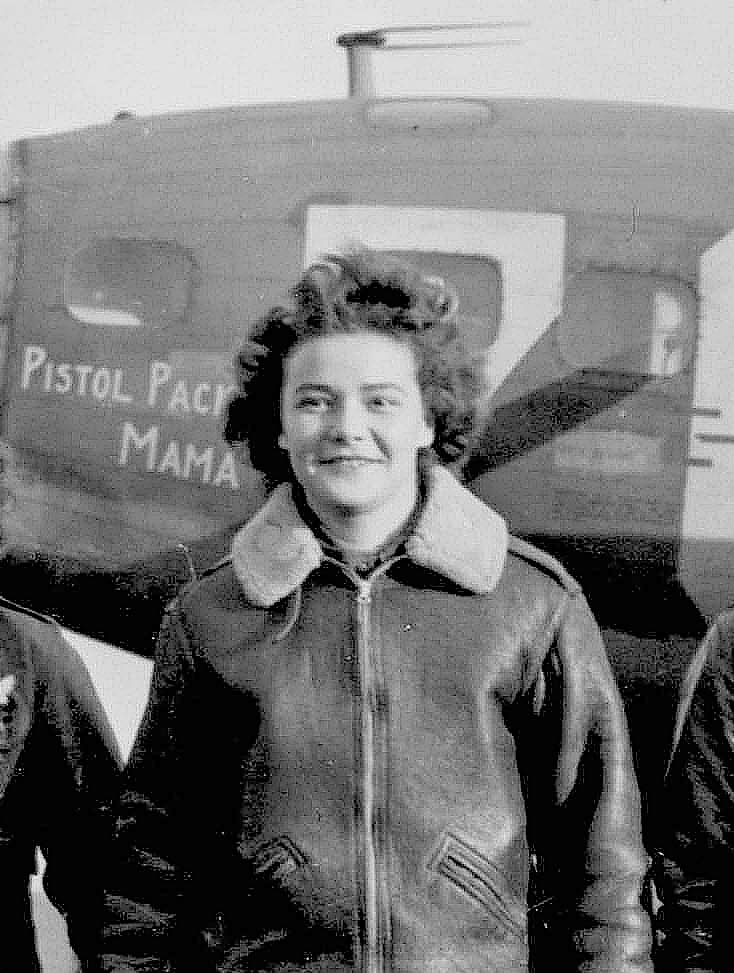
- Kirchner at Lockbourne Army Airfield in 1944, disembarking from a B-17 Flying Fortress
- Born: Margaret Ruth Kirchner; September 12, 1920; Youngstown, Ohio
- Died: July 12, 1998 (aged 77); Saginaw, Michigan
- Alma mater: Youngstown College; Central Michigan University
- Military career
- Allegiance: United States
- Service: United States Army Air Forces
- Service years: 1943–1944
- Nickname: Peg
- Unit: Women Airforce Service Pilots
- Awards: Congressional Gold Medal (posthumous)
- Other work: Elementary school principal

Margaret 'Peg' Kirchner Stevenson (née Kirchner; September 12, 1920 – July 12, 1998) was an American pilot and educator. Kirchner grew up in Youngstown, Ohio and studied at Youngstown College. She served in the Women Airforce Service Pilots from 1943 to 1944, and was one of 17 women to fly the Boeing B-17 Flying Fortress in the WASP program.

After the war, Kirchner moved to Saginaw, Michigan and taught for the Saginaw Public School District. She served as principal of five elementary schools in the district, retiring in 1985 after a 30-year career. Margaret Kirchner Stevenson died in Saginaw in 1998.

Like most of her colleagues, and despite her exemplary record as a B-17 pilot, Kirchner was unable to find employment in civilian aviation after the end of the war. In 1979, Stevenson received her honorable discharge from the United States Army Air Forces, backdated to December 1944. The Women Airforce Service Pilots were awarded the Congressional Gold Medal in 2009. Stevenson was inducted into the Saginaw County Hall of Fame in 2011, and the Michigan Women's Hall of Fame in 2019.

== Biography ==
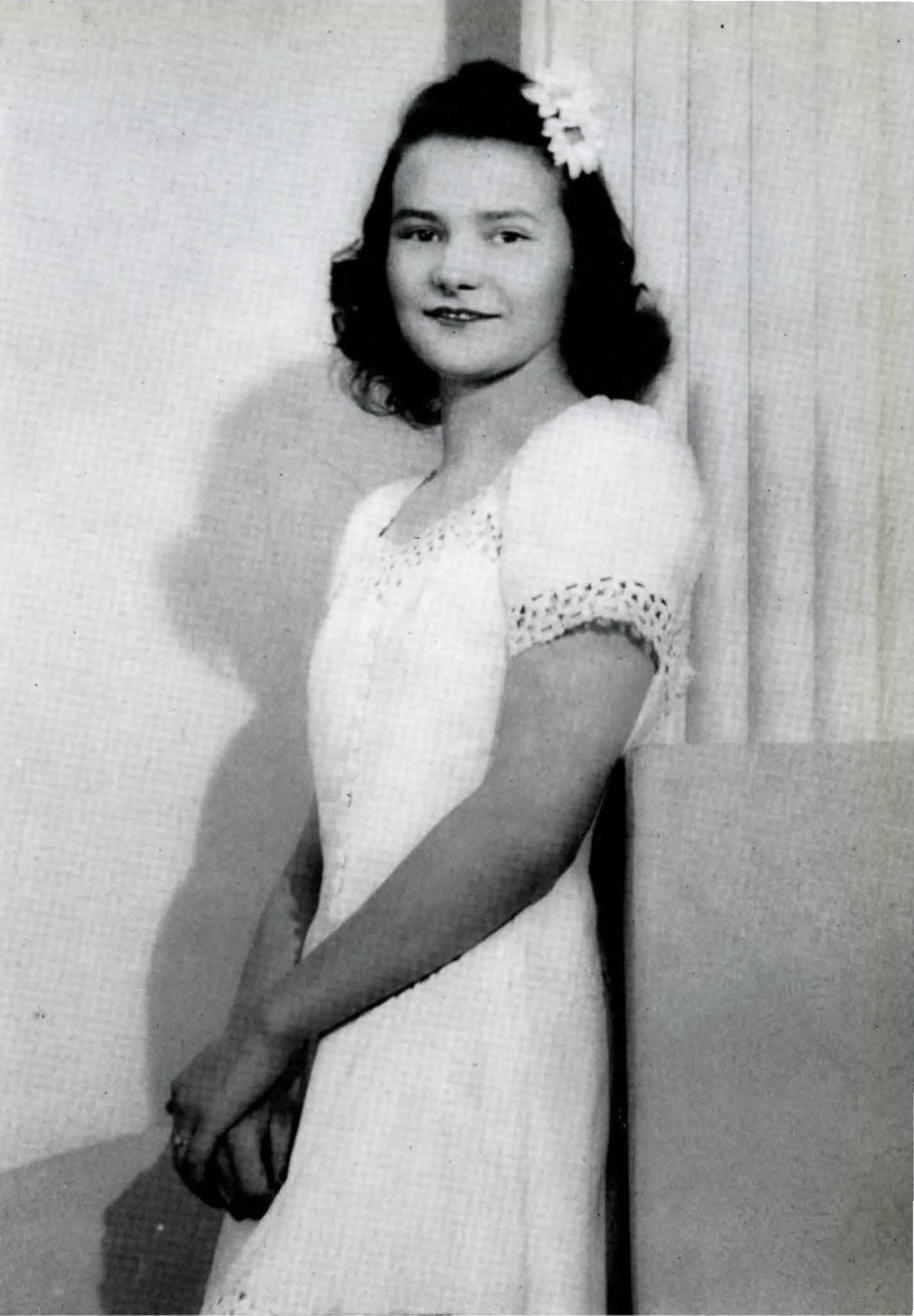
Youngstown College yearbook photo, 1941

Margaret Kirchner was born on September 12, 1920 in Youngstown, Ohio. She studied education at Youngstown College and gained her pilot's license through the Civilian Pilot Training Program in 1941.

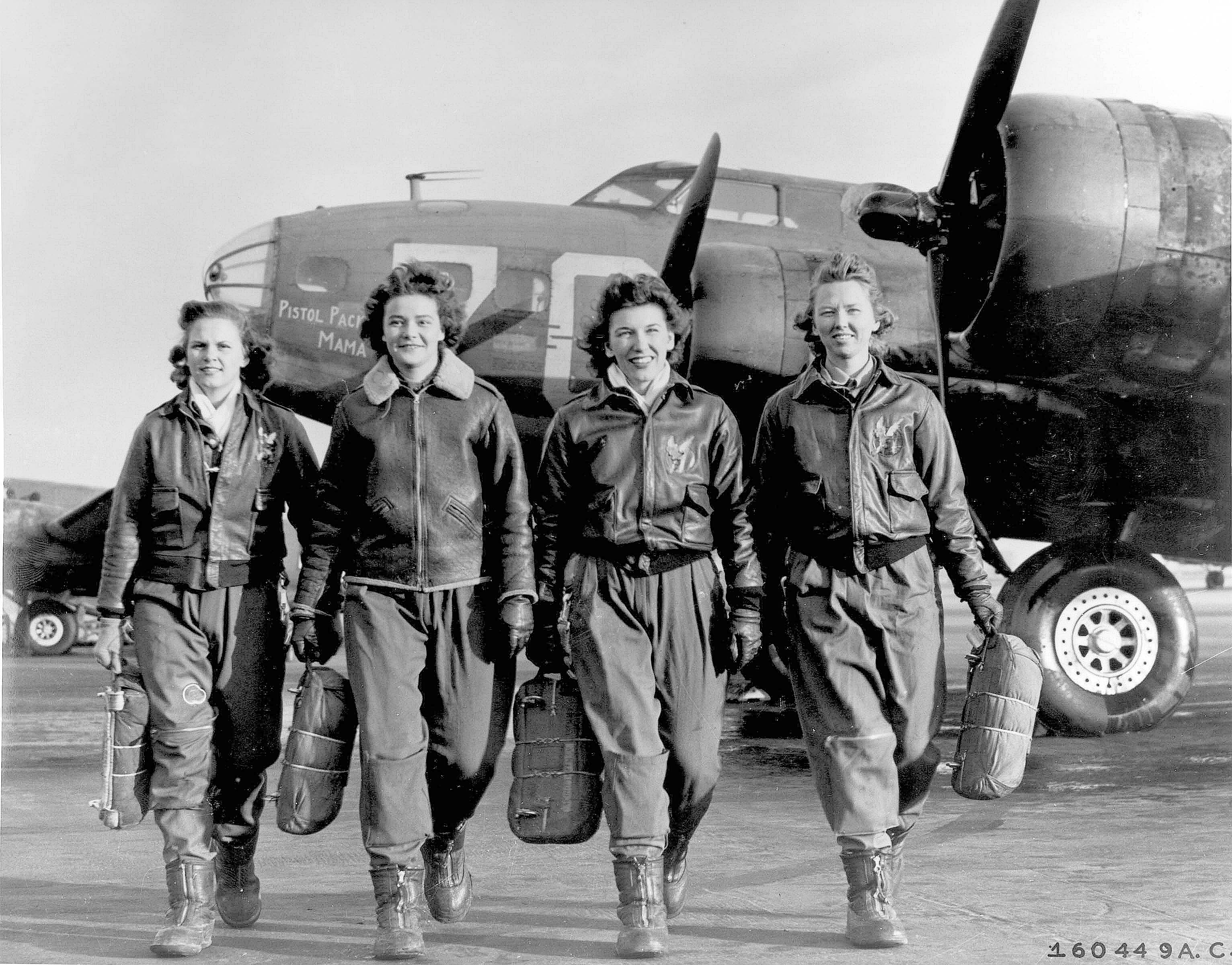
From left: Frances Green, Margaret Kirchner, Ann Waldner and Blanche Osborn disembarking from B-17 "Pistol Packin' Mama" at Lockbourne

Kirchner reported to Avenger Field in Sweetwater, Texas on Easter, 1943 to train as a ferry pilot for the Women Airforce Service Pilots. She excelled in her training, and was selected to train on the Boeing B-17 Flying Fortress at Lockbourne Army Airfield in Franklin County, Ohio. She was one of only 17 women to train on the B-17, serving alongside champion golfer Elizabeth Helen Dettweiler. Kirchner was one of only four WASP pilots to take the B-17 instructors' course.

Kirchner served in the Women Airforce Service Pilots program until its end in late 1944. After the war, Kirchner moved to Michigan. She married, taking the name Margaret Kirchner Stevenson, and had four children. Stevenson began teaching for the Saginaw Public School District in 1955.

By 1967, Stevenson had completed her graduate studies in education at Central Michigan University. She was appointed the principal of Lincoln Elementary School that year, and went on to serve as principal of four other elementary schools in the district. Stevenson retired in 1985 as principal of Zilwaukee Elementary School, after a 30-year career with the Saginaw Public School District.

The Women Airforce Service Pilots were retroactively granted military status in 1977. Previously, they were considered federal civil service employees, even though they were subject to military regulations. Stevenson received her honorable discharge in 1979, backdated to the end of her service in 1944. In a 1981 newspaper interview, Stevenson praised the decision to retroactively designate her and her peers' service as active duty, arguing that "we were under strict juristiction of the Air Force. We had status under that jurisdiction, but not the benefits."

Margaret Kirchner Stevenson died on July 12, 1998 in Saginaw.

== Legacy ==
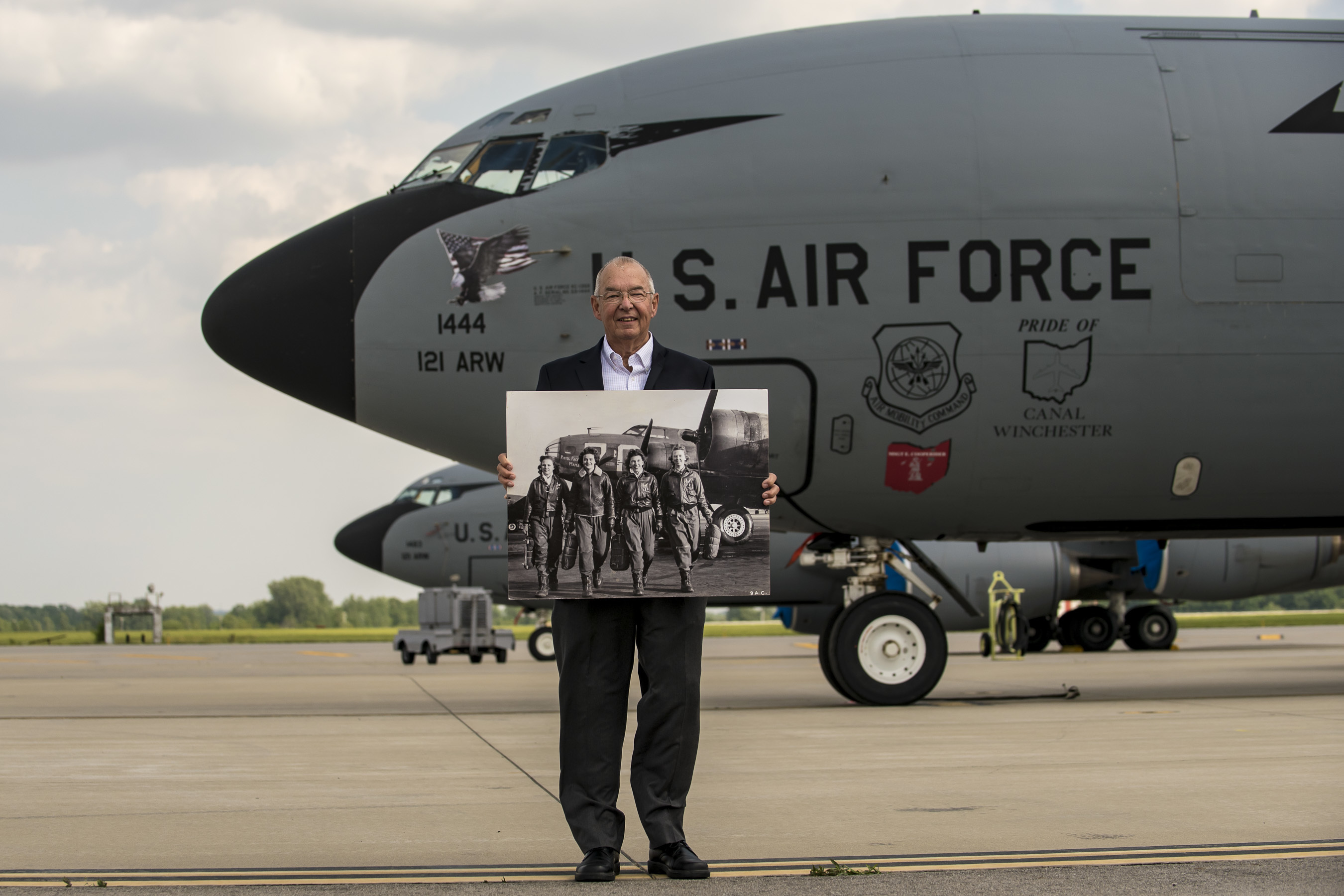
Stevenson's son Tom poses with the "Pistol Packin' Mama" photo at a 2019 ceremony on the flight line of Rickenbacker Air National Guard Base

The Women Airforce Service Pilots were awarded the Congressional Gold Medal by an act of Congress, signed into law by President Barack Obama in July 2009. Stevenson's son Tom accepted the award on her behalf in a ceremony in March 2010.

Stevenson was inducted into the Saginaw County Hall of Fame in 2011 and the Michigan Women's Hall of Fame in 2019.

Lockbourne Army Airfield is now Rickenbacker Air National Guard Base, hosting the 121st Air Refueling Wing. A memorial at the base, unveiled in 2019, features the four WASP pilots from the "Pistol Packin' Mama" photograph, including Stevenson.
