= Ella Mae Backus =

American lawyer (1863–1938)

Ella Mae Backus (1863–1938) was an American lawyer who became the first female Assistant U.S. Attorney in the State of Michigan, and the first female attorney in the U.S. Attorney's Office for the Western District of Michigan. At the time, she was one of only six female attorneys in the entire Department of Justice. Backus was originally employed as a stenographer in Traverse City, Michigan from 1891 to 1895. In 1895, she became a lawyer.

Hired to work in the U.S. Attorney's Office for the Western District of Michigan in 1903, by 1923 Backus was promoted to Assistant Attorney in the office. She would work there until her death in 1938. She was also the first woman in the Grand Rapids Bar Association.

She was inducted into the Michigan Women's Hall of Fame in 2017.
