= Jean Ledwith King =

American political activist (1924–2021)

Jean Ledwith King (March 16, 1924 – October 9, 2021) was an American attorney, teacher, political activist, and women's rights activist. She was inducted into the Michigan Women's Hall of Fame in 1989.

== Biography ==
King was born in March 1924. She graduated from the University of Michigan, earning both a bachelor's degree in English and a master’s in history. In 1965, King went to University of Michigan Law School, and gained her law degree in 1968. She, along with Lorraine Beebe chaired the Michigan abortion referendum campaign of 1972. The campaign failed, and King founded the Religious Coalition for Abortion Rights with Eleanor O'Brien. She had, in 1970 organized the Focus on Equal Employment for Women, which sparked an investigation by the United States Department of Health and Human Services into sex discrimination by University of Michigan, the first of its kind.

Six women, of whom Jean King was one, founded the first women's caucus in a major party, the Women's Caucus of the Michigan Democratic Party. That caucus would, in 1976 achieve the first delegation evenly split between men and women. In 1974, King filed a complaint against sex discrimination in textbooks in Kalamazoo Public Schools. As a result, the publisher, Houghton Mifflin Harcourt immediately issued a correction. In 2008, King was honored by Veteran Feminists of America for her work. The Women’s Center of Southeastern Michigan was named after King.

King died on October 9, 2021, at the age of 97.
