= Lucile A. Watts =

American judge (1920-2018)

Lucile Alexandra Watts (1920 – June 23, 2018) was an American judge. After 20 years as a private practice lawyer, Watts was elected a Wayne County Circuit Court judge in 1980. She was the first black woman to be elected as a circuit court judge in Michigan. In 2019, she was posthumously inducted into the Michigan Women's Hall of Fame.

== Early life ==
Watts was born in Homeville, Virginia, in 1920. She grew up in Alliance, Ohio, where she attended Alliance High School followed by the University of Detroit for her bachelor's degree. While earning her LLB from Detroit College of Law in 1962, she was one of very few woman law students in the legal daytime program. Upon graduating, she started her own practice after being unable to find work due to her gender.

== Career ==
As a private practice lawyer, Watts was recruited by Great Lakes Mutual Insurance Company to assist with the release of black men arrested during the 1967 Detroit riot. She joined other African-American lawyers in the community to organize and coordinate in defending the men and seeking their release.

After 20 years as a private practice lawyer, Watts was elected a Wayne County Circuit Court judge in 1980. She was the first black woman to be elected as a circuit court judge in Michigan. Prior to her death in 2018, Watts served as a board member at Focus: HOPE for 20 years, Woodward Academy, the YMCA of Metropolitan Detroit, Black Women Lawyers Association of Michigan, a lifetime member of the NAACP, and a National Honorary Member of Distinction of the Gamma Phi Delta Sorority. Watts died in her sleep on June 23, 2018, in her Detroit home.
