= Kathleen N. Straus =

American women's rights activist (born 1923)

- Born: Kathleen Nagler; December 3, 1923 (age 102); New York City, U.S.
- Education: Hunter College
- Organizations: League of Women voters; Michigan Tax Information Council; PRO Detroit; Keep Improving Detroit Schools; Center for Creative Studies; Michigan State Board of Education
- Political party: Democratic
- Spouses: Everett (Buddy) Straus (1948 - 1967; his death); Judge Walter Shapero (2008 - )
- Children: 2
- Awards: Anti-Defamation League Lifetime Achievement Award; American Jewish Committee Lifetime Achievement Award; Hunter College Hall of Fame; Michigan Education Hall of Fame; Michigan Women's Hall of Fame

Kathleen Nagler Straus (born December 3, 1923) is an American women's rights activist who served as a member of the Michigan State Board of Education from 1993 to 2016. She has been continuously involved in civic organizations in Michigan, since moving to Detroit in 1952. Her volunteer and professional roles have included the Presidency of the League of Women Voters of Detroit, executive director of People and Responsible Organizations (PRO) for Detroit, President of the Michigan State Board of Education, and Secretary of the National Association of State Boards of Education.

== Personal life and education ==
Kathleen Nagler was born in Harlem on December 3, 1923, the daughter of an Austrian-born lawyer and a homemaker. Her family moved to Belle Harbor for four years when she was as a young child, but returned to Manhattan thereafter, and grew up on the West Side. She graduated from Hunter College and worked as a teacher, and an economist in the United States Department of the Treasury in Washington, DC. She met her first husband, Everett Straus in Washington. They married in New York in 1948, when she was an analyst at the Federal Reserve Bank of New York. In 1952, Everett Straus was offered a job with a cigar manufacturer RG Dunn in Detroit, and they relocated with their young son, Peter. She began volunteer work with the League of Women Voters, the Adlai Stevenson presidential campaign, and millage campaigns. Her second child, Barbara was born a few years later.

Everett Straus died on Thanksgiving Day in 1967, when their children were aged 16 and 10. In May 2008, as the 85 year old President of the Michigan State Board of Education, she married the Honorable Walter Shapero, a 77 year old bankruptcy judge still working full-time.

== Career ==
=== Volunteer work ===
Upon moving to Detroit in 1952, Straus became involved with the League of Women voters, the Adlai Stevenson presidential campaign, millage campaigns to support local schools, and her local school PTA. Within a decade, she was president of the League of Women Voters of Metropolitan Detroit, and was a member of the Board of the League of Women Voters of Michigan from 1963 to 1965. In 1963, she was active in the Michigan Constitutional Convention. She was elected chair of the Board of Wayne County Community College, but without tax revenue to support the college, the board dissolved in 1966. She co-chaired mayor Jerome Cavanagh's re-election campaign in 1965, and was hired to lead the millage campaign of 1966. Cavanaugh named her to the Detroit Commission on Community Relations in 1966.

During the 1980s, she co-founded the Michigan Tax Informational Council and served as the council's first president.

She has also been President of the American Jewish Committee, Detroit Region and Jewish Community Council of Metropolitan Detroit, as well as a member of the Board of Trustees of the Michigan State Board for Public Junior and Community Colleges, the Detroit Science Center, the advisory board of the American Jewish Committee, ArtServe Michigan, Michigan Roundtable for Diversity and Inclusion, Michigan Women's Studies Association, and Communities in Schools in Detroit.

=== Professional career ===
Following the death of her first husband, Mayor Cavanaugh named Straus assistant director of Detroit's Community Renewal Agency. At the end of his administration, she took a position with the Southeast Michigan Council of Governments, a regional planning agency. She resigned from this position to run for Congress in 1974 to succeed Martha Griffiths in Michigan's 17th congressional district, but lost in the democratic primary. She then became staff director for the Michigan Senate Education Committee, and later Director of Governmental Relations for the Michigan Association of School Boards. She was also the executive director of PRO Detroit (People and Responsible Organizations for Detroit), a coalition of business, labor, civic groups, and schools established to implement the court-ordered desegregation of schools in Detroit. Her final professional position before election to the Michigan State Board of Education was as President of the Center for Creative Studies, a Detroit arts college.

=== Michigan State Board of Education ===
First elected to the Michigan State Board of Education in 1992, Straus was re-elected for two additional eight-year terms, ending on January 1, 2017, when she was 93 years old. During this time, she served seven two-year terms as President of the Board. As a board member, she advocated for services to promote the social, emotional, and physical health of students and their families, including the provision of social services to communities in school buildings after school hours. She was a strong supporter of arts programs, and a frequent visitor to schools and classrooms. She advocated for accountability measures and quality controls for charter schools.

== Awards ==
Straus has been awarded the David Kysilko Award from the National Association of State Boards of Education (2016), a Lifetime Achievement Award from the Anti-Defamation League (2004), a Lifetime Achievement Award from the American Jewish Committee (2010), the Wade Hampton McCree Jr. Award from the Federal Bar Association – Eastern District of Michigan Chapter (2011), and has been selected as a member of the Hunter College Hall of Fame (1994), the Michigan Education Hall of Fame (1994), and the Michigan Women's Hall of Fame (2000).
