= Marie-Therese Guyon Cadillac =

French-Canadian pioneer (1671–1746)

Marie-Therese Guyon Cadillac (1671–1746) was a French-Canadian-American pioneer. She is known as "The First Lady of Detroit."

== Biography ==
Cadillac was born in Beauport, Quebec City, to her parents Elizabeth Boucher and Denis Guyon, the latter a merchant and farmer. Both of her parents died before she turned twenty. It is not known who subsequently took care of her, but it is thought that her two brothers and her uncle may have played a role. On March 8, 1683, she was sent to the Ursuline Monastery of Quebec, where she would remain until April 4, 1684, before returning home in 1685.

At the age of seventeen, on June 25, 1687, Cadillac married Antoine de la Mothe Cadillac, a French military leader who helped to found the first settlement that would later become the city of Detroit. The couple lived together in Nova Scotia for several years.

In 1702, she and a female travel companion became the first white women to travel and reach Fort Pontchartrain du Détroit, where Cadillac joined her husband who had arrived a year earlier. While at the fort she engaged in many aspects of managing it, including signing contracts and hiring explorers. She served as the colony's doctor, and when her husband was away played an even larger role in the colony. In 1711, Cadillac moved to Mobile, then the capital of French Louisiana, after her husband was given a promotion. Cadillac eventually returned to France, where she lived until her death in 1740.

Cadillac and her husband generated the bulk of their capital from the fur trade and rent from land grants. Cadillac used her wealth to help build La Ville du Détroit into a city she hoped would rival Montreal and New York. She and her husband also started Detroit's first fine arts collection that was displayed in the town's church St. Anne.

She had thirteen children.

Cadillac was inducted into the Michigan Women's Hall of Fame in 1994.
