= Emily Burton Ketcham =

American teacher and suffragist

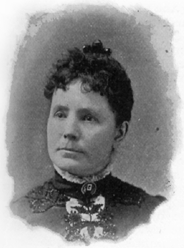
- Born: July 16, 1838; Grand Rapids, Michigan
- Died: January 13, 1907 (aged 68); Detroit, Michigan
- Occupations: Educator, Suffragist

Emily Burton Ketcham (July 16, 1838 – 1907) was an American suffragist.

== Biography ==
Ketcham was born on July 16, 1838, to parents Josiah Burton and Eliza Freeman Burton, pioneers in Grand Rapids. Ketcham graduated from Saint Mark's College, Henrietta Academy and Mary B. Allen's school for girls. At the age of fifteen, Ketcham became a teacher and she married her cousin Augustus Canfield Norton in Grand Rapids on October 2, 1861. After his death, she married Smith G. Ketcham. She first became involved in the women's suffrage movement in 1873. She met with Susan B. Anthony when she lived in Rochester, and developed a lasting friendship with her in the 1890s. In 1893 Ketcham spoke in the Woman's Building at the Chicago World's Fair. On April 27, 1899, the Women's National Suffrage Association held its annual meeting in Grand Rapids, Michigan, at the urging of Ketcham, the only time that the meeting would be held in Michigan. Ketcham was heavily involved with the Grand Rapids Woman's Suffrage Association, The Political Equality Club, The Susan B. Anthony Club, The Woman's Civic League and the Woman's and Children's Protective League. A charter member of the Michigan Equal Suffrage Association, she would serve as its president from 1892-1893, and again in 1900. She died on January 13, 1907, in Detroit, Michigan.

Ketcham was inducted into the Michigan Women's Hall of Fame in 1999.
