= Lida Holmes Mattman =

American microbiologist

Lida Holmes Mattman

Lida Holmes Mattman (July 31, 1912 – August 6, 2008) was an immunologist. She graduated with a M.S. in virology from the University of Kansas and a Ph.D. in immunology from Yale University. Mattman taught in the fields of immunology, microbiology, bacteriology, virology and pathology for over 30 years. She worked at various schools and institutions including Harvard University, Howard Hughes Institute, Oakland University and Wayne State University. She was a professor emeritus in the Department of Biological Sciences at Wayne State University in Detroit where she was engaged in research and lecturing. She has served as president of the Michigan Branch of the American Society for Microbiology, as chairman of the Medical Division of the Michigan Academy of Sciences, and held various offices in the local chapter of Sigma Xi.

Her studies have concerned investigating the role of surface tension depressants in immunological systems, the first complement fixation with a bacteria-free virus, the first report of wound botulism, geotrichum mycemia, nasal carriage of Clostridium tetani, antibiotic cure of rhinoscleroma, antibiotic sensitivity testing of Coccidiodes immitis, and electron microscope studies of Peptococci. The most in-depth studies relate to L Forms spontaneously occurring in vivo and in vitro.

Mattman developed a new method for culturing Borrelia burgdorferi from patients with purported chronic Lyme disease. This culture method was discredited when it was found that the method used a medium that killed B. burgdorferi. Mattman also authored the book Cell Wall Deficient Forms: Stealth Pathogens. A 2014 literature review found that Cell Wall Deficient forms, also known as L-forms, do not have a role in Lyme disease.

She died in 2008 at the age of 96.
