= Cora Reynolds Anderson =

American politician (1882–1950)

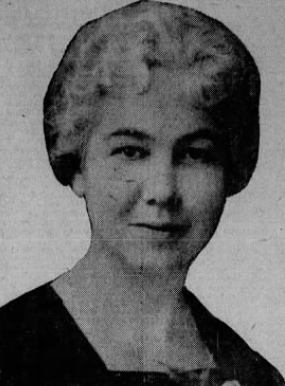
- Anderson in 1924

Member of the Michigan House of Representatives from the Iron County district
- In office 1925–1926
- Preceded by: Patrick H. O'Brien
- Succeeded by: William C. Birk

Personal details
- Born: April 10, 1882 L'Anse, Michigan, U.S.
- Died: April 11, 1950 (aged 68) Pentland Township, Michigan, U.S.
- Party: Republican
- Spouse: Charles Harold Anderson

Cora Reynolds Anderson (April 10, 1882 – March 11, 1950) was an American politician who served in the Michigan House of Representatives as a member of the Republican Party. She was the first woman and Native American elected to the Michigan House of Representatives.

== Early life ==
Cora Reynolds Anderson was born on April 10, 1882, in L'Anse, Michigan, to Robert B. Reynolds and Madeline Bachand. She was of English, French, and Chippewa descent. She was a member of the first graduating class of L'Anse High School. In 1903, she married Charles Harold Anderson.

== Michigan House of Representatives ==
=== Elections ===
In 1924, Anderson won the Republican nomination in the Iron County district and won in the general election without opposition to succeed Patrick H. O'Brien. She was the first woman and Native American to serve in the Michigan House of Representatives. Anderson was inaugurated on January 7, 1925.

On April 28, 1926, Anderson announced at a meeting of the Michigan Federation of Republican Women's clubs that she would seek reelection. During the campaigned she urged other women to seek election to political offices. On July 28, she filed to renomination as the Republican candidate, but was defeated in the primary by William C. Birk. No other women were nominated by the Republican Party during the 1926 elections. In the general election Birk won and Anderson left office on January 7, 1925.

=== Tenure ===
In 1925, Speaker Fred B. Wells appointed Anderson as chair of the committee on the industrial school for girls at Adrian, Michigan. During the fifty-third session of the Michigan House of Representatives from 1925 to 1926 she served on the Agriculture, Insurance, and Northern State Normal School committees.

On September 9, 1925, Anderson was selected to serve as vice president of the Republican Women's Federation of Michigan. From January 5 to 6, 1926, she served as a delegate, as one of the first women to do so, representing Michigan at the Great Lakes-St. Lawrence tidewater congress.

== Later life and legacy ==
Anderson died on March 11, 1950, in Pentland Township, Michigan.

On December 19, 2000, the Anderson House Office Building (the office building for Michigan state House members) was named in her honor. In 2001, she was inducted into the Michigan Women's Hall of Fame. In 2022, a bill to name the post office located at 404 US-41 North in Baraga County, Michigan the “Cora Reynolds Anderson Post Office” was signed into law.

== See also ==
- Eva McCall Hamilton — first woman to serve in the Michigan Senate
- List of Native American politicians
- Native American women in politics
