= Valeria Lipczynski =

Polish American advocate (1845–1930)

Valeria Lipczynski (1846–1930) was an American businesswoman.

== Biography ==
Lipczynski was a Polish immigrant to the United States, who immigrated in 1869.

She worked as a correspondent for several Polish newspapers and played a large role in easing the assimilation of many Poles to American life, as well as co-founding the Polish Democratic Club. For her work, she earned the moniker "Queen of the Poles." In her work, she was involved in founding many churches such as St. Adalbert, Sacred Heart and St. Isidore parishes as well as the Wiarus Society, a cultural organization. With her work in the Polish National Alliance, she started the Society of Polish Ladies. In 1901 Lipczynski was the first woman delegate to a Polish National Alliance national convention and was in 1905, the first female elected to the board of directors, and later became the organization's commissioner-at-large in the United States. In World War I, she raised large amounts of money to provide relief for the poles. For this work, the General Haller Swords medal was awarded to her. The Polish government additionally awarded her the Golden Cross of Merit for her lives work in 1925.
