= Joan Luedders Wolfe =

American environmentalist (1929–2021)

- Born: Joan Luedders; May 2, 1929; Highland Park, Michigan, United States
- Died: January 23, 2021 (aged 91)
- Education: University of Michigan
- Occupation: Environmental activist
- Known for: Founding of the West Michigan Environmental Action Council; Important environmental legislation

Joan Luedders Wolfe (May 2, 1929 – January 23, 2021) was an environmental activist who founded the West Michigan Environmental Action Council in 1968. She has been described as "one of the mothers of the modern environmental movement", often acting on a national or global level to achieve local change.

Wolfe coordinated the drafting and passage of the landmark Michigan Environmental Protection Act of 1970. At Wolfe's request, the law was written by University of Michigan law professor Joseph Sax. The legislation became the model for similar statutes in twelve other states, and the basis for federal and international environmental law. She and her husband, Willard E. Wolfe, DDS (March 8, 1926 – February 16, 2011), were also key strategists in writing and lobbying for passage of Michigan's Inland Lakes and Streams Act of 1972.

== Early life and education ==
Joan Wolfe (née Luedders) grew up in Highland Park, Michigan. Her parents were William and Mary Lou Luedders. She had a sister Sarah and also a twin brother Dean. She attended Hollins College in Virginia for two years and then transferred to University of Michigan, where she earned an undergraduate degree in economics. Following graduation, Wolfe worked for the Ford Motor Company for a year then in Boston, Massachusetts, for a year, living with friends, returning to Michigan in 1953.

Wolfe married Will Wolfe in 1953, and they raised their sons Peter and John in Belmont, Michigan. During the early portion of their marriage, Joan Wolfe was a homemaker and occasional substitute teacher. Wolfe developed an interest in birdwatching, eventually becoming an expert, with a special interest in spring warblers.

In her early adulthood, Wolfe developed an interest in environmentalism which she later attributed to two influences. One was her experience in the Girl Scouts as a child. The second was the 1962 publication of the book Silent Spring, authored by Rachel Carson.

== Career ==
As a young adult, Wolfe was an active member of the Audubon Society, and her husband was similarly active with Trout Unlimited. She recognized that these organizations had certain objectives in common but did not work in a common approach and that the lack of coordination limited their effectiveness. Therefore, Wolfe developed an approach to environmental action that emphasized cooperation between various environmental groups. Wolfe stated in a 2008 interview, "...it was our idea that there should be an environmental organization that a lot of different organizations could join and there could be cooperative work." She enlisted the aid of other environmentalist leaders in Michigan, ultimately resulting in the creation of the West Michigan Environmental Action Council (WMEAC). Wolfe served as director of the organization.

As the hazards of DDT to wildlife and the environment became better known, WMEAC sued the state of Michigan to ban the use of DDT for agricultural purposes. However, the courts ruled that private citizens and private organizations could not sue on behalf of the environment, and so the lawsuit failed. Subsequently, Wolfe worked with University of Michigan Law School professor Joseph Sax to draft legislation stipulating that ordinary citizens could be deputized and empowered as defenders of the environment and thereby be able to pursue civil lawsuits for the sake of the environment. The legislation was successfully passed in 1970 as the Michigan Environmental Protection Act. This legislation ultimately served as a model for similar legislation for approximately twelve other states in the United States.

Joan Luedders Wolfe and her husband Willard E. Wolfe co-led the effort that ultimately resulted in passage of Michigan's Inland Lakes and Streams Act of 1972. Provisions of this legislation included permitting requirements for construction or any land-altering activity close to Michigan's extensive shoreline and its lakes and streams. Subsequently, others have questioned whether the legislation was sufficient.

Later on, WMEAC under Wolfe's leadership took on environmental aspects related to nuclear waste disposal.

Wolfe was appointed in 1973 by Gov. William Milliken to the Michigan Natural Resources Commission. She was the first woman appointed to the committee and eventually became chair. She was also a member of the first Natural Resources Trust Fund Board, the Governor's Advisory Committee on Electric Energy Alternatives, and the board of the National Audubon Society.

Wolfe is author of the book Making Things Happen: How to be an Effective Volunteer, which was published in 1991. Based on her experience in the environmental movement, Wolfe provides an assessment of volunteerism and outlines the basic skills that volunteers need to make a stronger impact.

Later in life, Wolfe worked at the Resource Recovery Department for Kent County, Michigan, and taught enrichment classes at the Oakdale Elementary School in Grand Rapids, Michigan. She also served on the board of the National Audubon Society.

Regarding her accomplishments, Wolfe stated, "....I never aspired to be head of anything in particular, but I did aspire to get things done." She was active in the League of Women Voters. Wolfe also wrote an account of the passage of the Michigan Environmental Protection Act of 1970 and the Inland Lakes and Streams Act of 1972 that provides advice to activists seeking to enact legislation today.

One of Wolfe's environmental accomplishments, the Michigan Environmental Protection Act, was partially reversed through actions of a conservative majority of the Michigan Supreme Court in 2004.

== Personal life ==
External images
- Photographs of Joan Luedders Wolfe
- Photo of Wolfe, as published by Michigan Women Forward
- Photos of Wolfe at different stages of life, as published in an on-line obituary

Wolfe's younger son Peter was killed in 1984 while serving as a Peace Corps Volunteer in Guatemala. After her husband Will retired, the couple lived in Frankfort, Michigan. Joan Luedders Wolfe died from end stage dementia on January 23, 2021.

== Honors ==
In 1996, Wolfe was one of eight honorees of the Michigan Women's Hall of Fame, and was awarded in 1973 an honorary doctorate in public service from Western Michigan University. In April 2014 she was inducted into the Michigan Environmental Hall of Fame. In 2004, Wolfe was queen of the National Trout Festival, held annually in Kalkaska, Michigan.
