= Julia Wheelock Freeman =

American missionary

Julia Susan Wheelock Freeman
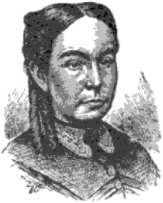
- Born: October 7, 1833; Avon, Ohio, U.S.
- Died: June 7, 1900 (aged 66); Quincy, Illinois, U.S.
- Education: Kalamazoo College
- Occupations: Missionary; nurse; writer
- Spouse: Porter C. Freeman (m. 1873)

Julia Susan Wheelock Freeman (1833-1900) was an American missionary, who was known as the "Florence Nightingale of Michigan". She was inducted into the Michigan Women's Hall of Fame.

== Biography ==
Freeman was born in Avon, Ohio, on October 7, 1833. She attended classes at Kalamazoo College, and became a teacher in Palo, Michigan. During the American Civil War, upon realizing that her brother, Orville was injured, Freeman traveled to Washington, D.C. to nurse him. However, his wounds were severe enough that he died before she arrived. Freeman decided to remain in D.C. nonetheless, and nurse soldiers. From September 1862 to July 1865, she was a nurse, working with the Michigan Soldiers Relief Association to aid soldiers. She briefly spent time back in Michigan as a result of contracting typhoid fever, during which she raised funds for her work. On May 28, 1873, she married Porter C. Freeman. In 1870, she published a collection of memoirs titled The Boys in White.

She died in Quincy, Illinois on June 7, 1900.
