= Josephine Gomon =

American teacher and activist (1892 – 1975)

Josephine Fellows Gomon (June 29, 1892 – November 13, 1975) was a social and political activist, mayoral secretary, labor leader and schoolteacher. She is noted for her contributions to Detroit, Michigan through city politics, civil service and activism.

== Biography ==
Gomon was born Josephine Fellows in 1892 to Mary Walsh and Augustus W. Fellows in Ann Arbor, Michigan. She studied mathematics at the University of Michigan, and moved to Detroit after graduating in 1913 to teach physics and mathematics at Wayne State University (then called the College of the City of Detroit). She married R. Louis Gomon in 1916 and had five children with him: Bobby Lou, William, Howard Garner, Jeanne and R. Louis Jr. While raising her children, Gomon worked as a teacher in Detroit's public school system and wrote a column about education for The Detroit News.

In the 1920s Gomon became active in Detroit's birth control movement. She helped launch Planned Parenthood nationally and served as the president of the organization's Detroit chapter. After unsuccessfully running for public office in Detroit in 1929—being one of the first women to do so—Gomon began working for politician Frank Murphy in 1930 as an assistant on his mayoral campaign. After he was elected, Gomon became Murphy's executive secretary; he appointed her to the position of chairwoman on the Mayor's Unemployment Committee and she assisted him with the creation of several New Deal programs. Gomon became the director of the Detroit Housing Commission in 1933, where she supervised the construction of the city's first public housing until she was pressured to leave in 1938. She made a second bid for public office in 1935, but she was not elected. In 1941 she was recruited by Henry Ford to the role of Director of Women Personnel at the Ford Motor Company's Willow Run bomber plant for the duration of World War II. Gomon made her third and final bid for public office in 1941, and although she was unsuccessful again, she had a significant following. She later worked as an advisor for Walter Reuther and Franklin D. Roosevelt.

Gomon effectively retired from politics and public service after World War II. She ran a radio show called "Opinion Unlimited" on WKMH from 1945 until 1948. She then dedicated her time to social justice projects for welfare and human rights through Americans for Democratic Action, the National Association for the Advancement of Colored People and the American Civil Liberties Union. In 1960 she was honored at a tribute dinner attended by 300 people, including many of Michigan's high-profile politicians, and in 1961 she was awarded an honorary degree by Wayne State University.

Gomon continued her efforts in political activism until shortly before she died in 1975 at the age of 85. Her obituary in the Detroit Free Press described her as "a spirited Detroiter", the "City's Conscience", and "one of the most influential women in the city's history". In 1983, she was inducted into the Michigan Women's Hall of Fame.
