= Dorothy Haener =

American women union activist

- Born: December 18, 1917; Detroit, Michigan
- Died: January 6, 2001 (aged 83)
- Known for: Union Work for the United Auto Workers; Founding member of the National Organization for Women
- Spouse: None

Dorothy Haener (December 18, 1917 – January 6, 2001) was a union activist for the United Auto Workers International Union's Women's Department and a founder of the National Organization for Women.

== Early life and union work ==
Dorothy Haener was born on December 18, 1917, in Detroit, Michigan. After graduating high school the prior year, Haener got a spot welder position at Wayne Wire Cloth Company in 1937. She lost her job there after the company's poor working conditions provoked her into campaigning for unionization. In 1941, Haener was hired at Ford's newly constructed bomber plant, Willow Run. While she started as a department clerk, she eventually got training at the Ford Trade School for inspection with help from the United Auto Workers union. Haener worked there as an inspector until Kaiser-Frazer obtained control of Willow Run in the summer of 1944, and Haener was laid off. Until she was rehired at the Kaiser-Frazer plant in late 1946, she worked at a toy factory. She was unable to get her old position back and instead was hired to do lower-paying clerical work. In an effort to improve wages, Haener and others unionized the clerical and engineering departments under the United Auto Workers as Local 50. Haener slowly climbed the ranks of the UAW, getting elected into the Local 50 union committee, then later into trustee of the larger Local 142, which contained Local 50 at that point, then into the Local 142's top negotiating committee.

In 1952, Haener was accepted a national United Auto Workers organizing-staff position offered by president of the UAW Walter Reuther. During this time she helped technical and office workers unionize under the UAW. While in her position she also helped develop a separate women's department within the UAW and pressured all levels of the UAW to increase women's opportunities there. In 1961 she left the UAW organizing staff and joined the UAW Women's Department. While in the UAW Women's Department, she helped figure out ways to push more women into higher-paying jobs, such as by having them file grievances and negotiating. Haener retired from the UAW in 1982.

== National Organization of Women ==
In June 1966, Haener was one of 28 women who created the National Organization of Women. While Haener and UAW initially supported NOW, UAW had to stop supporting the National Organization of Women after NOW declared support for the UAW-opposed Equal Rights Amendment in their second meeting in 1968. During this period, Haener continued to pay personal dues but was otherwise inactive. This changed in 1970 when UAW changed their position on the Equal Rights Amendment and could support NOW.

== Personal life and other accomplishments ==
In 1971, Haener was one of the many women who helped create the National Women's Political Caucus. In 1983, Dorothy Haener was inducted into Michigan Women's Hall of Fame.

Haener never married, as she claimed herself to be too independent to get married. Haener was a member of the democratic party and was a delegate at the 1976 Democratic National Convention. Haener died on January 6, 2001.

== Bibliography ==
- Brokaw, Tom (1998). "Home Front - Dorothy Haener". The Greatest Generation. Random House. pp. 96–99. ISBN 0-375-50202-5.
- O'Farrell, Brigid; Kornbluh, Joyce L. (1996). "Chapter 8 - Sometimes You Have to Rock the Boat". Rocking the Boat: Union Women's Voices, 1915-1975. Rutgers University Press. pp. 159–183. ISBN 0-8135-2268-4.
- Gabin, Nancy F (1990). Feminism in the Labor Movement - Women and the United Auto Workers, 1935–1975. Cornell University Press. ISBN 0-8014-9725-6.
