= Bordetella trematum =

Scientific classification
- Domain: Bacteria
- Kingdom: Pseudomonadati
- Phylum: Pseudomonadota
- Class: Betaproteobacteria
- Order: Burkholderiales
- Family: Alcaligenaceae
- Genus: Bordetella
- Species: B. trematum

Binomial name
- Bordetella trematum Vandamme et al. 1996

Strains
- LMG 13506T; LMG 14446; LMG 14447; LMG 14448; LMG 14523; LMG 14991; LMG 14992; LMG 14993; LMG 15543; LMG 16652

Species of bacterium

Bordetella trematum is a species of Gram-negative bacteria identified in 1996 by comparison of 10 strains of B. trematum against other well characterized Bordetella and Alcaligenes species. The term trema refers to something pierced or penetrated, or to a gap. "Trematum" pertains to open things, and refers to the presence of bacteria in wounds and other exposed parts of the body. Strain LMG 13506^{T} is the reference strain for this species.

== Isolation ==
Bordetella species typically infect the respiratory tracts of humans, but B. trematum has never been isolated from a human or animal respiratory tract. It has been isolated from human ear infection and limb wounds. Below is a list of known B. trematum strains, alternative strain designation, and the date and source where they were first isolated:

Strain	Alternative Designation	Date	Source
LMG 13506^{T}	1779^{T}	Unknown	Chronic otitis media, human, Germany
LMG 14446	CCUG 13902	1980	Leg wound
LMG 14447	CCUG 13905	1980	Ankle wound
LMG 14448	CCUG 31299A	Unknown	Unknown
LMG 14523	CCUG 24727	1983	Leg wound, United States
LMG 14991	CCUG 13903A	1980	Leg wound
LMG 14992	CCUG 13903B	1980	Leg wound
LMG 14993	CCUG 13904	1980	Arm wound
LMG 115543	CCUG 14939	1983	United States
LMG 16652	DMMZ 1733	Unknown	31-year-old man, chronic otitis media, Switzerland

== Characteristics ==
Bordetella trematum is a Gram-negative, capsulated, non-spore-forming, rod about 0.5 μm wide and 1.0-1.8 μm long, but rods as long as 2.4 μm have been observed. It grows aerobically at temperatures ranging from 25-42 °C, with optimal temperature for growth ranging from 35-37 °C. Microaerobic growth may be observed at optimal temperatures. It is motile via peritrichous flagella. B. trematum is catalase positive. It is unique in being oxidase negative, since all other species of Bordetella are oxidase positive.

Bordetella trematum may be cultured on horse blood agar, MacConkey agar, and Bordet–Gengou agar. When grown on Bordet–Gengou agar, which is the standard agar for Bordetella isolation, colonies are convex, pearly, smooth, almost transparent, and glistening, and are surrounded by a zone of hemolysis. When grown on blood agar, colonies are grayish cream to white, circular, and convex. B. trematum does not ferment lactose and produces colorless colonies on MacConkey agar.

== Metabolism ==
Little is known about the metabolism of the species B. trematum since it is relatively newly discovered. Like all Bordetella species, B. trematum is a chemoorganotroph and requires nicotinamide, organic sulfur such as cysteine, and organic nitrogen such as amino acids for growth by respiratory metabolism. Its metabolism is not saccharolytic, meaning it does not use any form sugar for energy. Six of the ten known strains are able to reduce nitrate to nitrite. It is indole negative and urease negative.

== Taxonomy ==
DNA-rRNA hybridization was used to place B. trematum LMG 13506^{T} in the family Alcaligenaceae. Amplified ribosomal DNA restriction analysis revealed a 94% similarity between the B. trematum reference strain and the Bordatella reference species, B. pertussis. Later, additional evidence to determine placement at the genus level came from DNA-DNA hybridization of B. trematum strains LMG 13506 and LMG 14446 against reference strains of other Bordetella and Alcaligenes species. Results showed the species B. trematum to be most like members of the genus Bordetella. SDS-PAGE analysis of whole-cell proteins allowed for development of a dendrogram displaying that Bordetella is not monophyletic. DNA-rRNA hybridization and 16S rRNA sequence analysis shows a close relationship between Bordetella and Alcaligenes. It is often difficult to differentiate between the two genera; in fact, some species across the genera are phenotypically identical.

Bordetella trematum and B. holmesii are the only species that do not colonize the respiratory tract. B. pertussis and B. parapertussis are respiratory pathogens that cause pertussis. B. bronchiseptica and B. avium are respiratory pathogens of other animals. B. hinzii is not pathogenic and colonizes the respiratory tract of birds. B. holmesii has been isolated from human blood. Members of the genus Alcaligenes colonize humans, but not the respiratory tract, and soil and water.

== Genomics ==
The B. trematum genome was sequenced in 2013, and is currently undergoing annotation. The genome is estimated to possess 4,145 coding sequences with the majority of sequences coding for amino acids, amino acid derivatives, and carbohydrate pathways. About 184 genes are predicted to be involved in membrane transport. It has a 64-65% GC content. The total genome size is not currently known.

== Pathogenicity ==
Bordetella trematum is a nonpathogenic, opportunistic that has been isolated from human wounds. In the reported case of a diabetic foot ulcer, there was no evidence supporting a causative role for the organism in infection, and it resolved without antimicrobial therapy. Accordingly, B. trematum may be present as a colonizer in wound environments, though it should still be considered when otherwise unclassified Gram-negative rods are recovered from clinical specimens.

Bordetella endotoxins are unique to the genus, species, and strain. B. trematum is the only Bordetella species with a semirough lipopolysaccharide which contains a single O-unit. The lipid A unit of B. trematum is identical to that of the opportunistic bacterium B. hinzii, but unlike any other Bordetella species.
