= Adenylate cyclase toxin =

Toxin produced by bacteria

Identifiers
- Organism: Bordetella pertussis
- Symbol: CyaA
- RefSeq (Prot): ACU81101
- UniProt: J7QLC0
Search for
- Structures: Swiss-model
- Domains: InterPro

Adenylate cyclase toxin is a virulence factor produced by some members of the genus Bordetella. Together with the pertussis toxin it is the most important virulence factor of the causative agent of whooping cough, Bordetella pertussis. Bordetella bronchiseptica and Bordetella parapertussis, also able to cause pertussis-like symptoms, also produce adenylate cyclase toxin. It is a toxin secreted by the bacteria to influence the host immune system.

== Structure ==
Adenylate cyclase toxin from Bordetella pertussis is a 1706 amino acid residue long protein. The protein consists of three domains: from the N-terminus up to roughly residue 400, there is an adenylate-cyclase domain; between residues 500 and 700, there is a hydrophobic domain; and from residue 1000 to the C-terminus, there are calcium binding repeats. Two acylation sites are located at lysine residues K860 and K983. The part of the toxin from residue 400 to the C-terminus, called hemolysin, is structurally related to a large family of bacterial toxins - RTX toxins. Differences between the toxins of different Bordetella species are mainly in the calcium-binding domain.

=== Folding and secretion ===
The toxin is secreted by the Type I secretion system, which spans both membranes and periplasm space, allowing the toxin to be secreted from the cytoplasm straight outside the cell. A large proportion of the toxin remains associated with the bacterium exterior proteins, mainly filamentous haemagglutinin, but these toxin molecules are not active. Besides attachment to bacterial proteins, aggregation also inactivates the toxin. This quick inactivation highlights the necessity of close contact between secreting bacterium and target cell.

== RTX toxins ==
RTX stands for 'repeats in toxins,' but not all members of the family are toxins. Repeating aspartate and glycine rich nonapeptides (repeats 9 amino acids long) are a characteristic feature of this family of proteins, and are able to bind calcium ions. A feature of the RTX proteins is their ability to form pores in cell membranes, allowing ions to leak. This may manifest as a hemolytic activity on erythrocytes, leading to this group of toxins being called 'hemolysins'. The cell types which are vulnerable to this pore-forming activity varies among the toxins. The acylation of lysines is required for the pore-forming cytotoxic effects of all the RTX proteins.

Toxins from many known gram-negative pathogenic bacteria are in the RTX family. An example is α-hemolysin from Escherichia coli or RtxA from Vibrio cholerae.

== Function ==
=== Molecular mechanisms ===
Adenylate cyclase toxin binds to target cells by the complement receptor 3 (CD11b/CD18, or Mac-1). Target cell are therefore myeloid lineage cells, mainly phagocytes, such as neutrophils. Binding to cells without the CR3 also happens, but at a much lower rate. The portion responsible for binding to the receptor is inside the calcium binding repeats, from residues 1166 to 1287. The hemolysin portion of the protein then binds to the target membrane and inserts itself into the bilayer. The adenylate cyclase (AC) domain is then translocated across the cytoplasmic membrane into the cytoplasm. Translocation of the AC domain is independent of cytotoxic pore-forming activity, as these two activities require to toxin to adopt different conformations. The transiently opened pores do, however, contribute to AC domain function by potassium leakage and calcium influx into the target cell, which slows endocytosis of CR3/adenylate cyclase toxin clusters, also, the CR3/toxin complex is mobilized by detachment from the cytoskeleton. The complex is then recruited into cholesterol-rich lipid rafts. Calcium influx by itself has many negative effects on target cells, such as deregulation of cellular signalling.

The adenylate cyclase domain has intrinsic enzymatic activity. Translocation of the AC domain into the cell starts the main process by which this toxin influences target cells: the AC domain binds calmodulin, and catalyzes unregulated production of cAMP from ATP. cAMP is an important second messenger molecule and its massive overproduction affects many cellular processes. In phagocytes, most of the bactericidal functions are stopped by cAMP-mediated activation of PKA and Epac.

=== Effect on target cells ===
The above described effects of the adenylate cyclase toxin, mainly the cAMP overproduction, have a profound effect on target cells. Although phagocytic immune cells migrate to the site of infection in the lungs, they are not able to mount an effective response. Not only the phagocytic uptake of bacteria is blocked, but subsequent production of ROS by neutrophils and monocytes, NETs by neutrophils, and NO by macrophages, is also inhibited. The effect on neutrophils is most important in early infection with Bordetella, impairing most of their antimicrobial functions. Intoxication with the adenylate cyclase toxin leads to shift in polarization of macrophages from M1 (proinflammatory) phenotype to M2 (immunoregulatory) phenotype and may lead to macrophage apoptosis. cAMP accumulation after adenylate cyclase intoxication also interferes with IRF signalling in dendritic cells, which leads to lower IL-12 production. IL-12 is important for T-cell response polarization. Other effects of cAMP on dendritic cell interaction with T-cells are also detrimental to the immune response. Although cAMP induces dendritic cell migration into lymph nodes, it lowers their capacity to interact with T-cells and present antigen. This has a tolerogenic effect on the T-cell population.

== Pertussis vaccination ==
Vaccination against Bordetella pertussis is used in infancy to prevent whooping cough. The recent switch from whole-cell pertussis vaccine to acellular component vaccine in many countries has led to the fact that adenylate cyclase toxin is not present in most vaccines. Although not included in current vaccines, research shows that immunization with adenylate cyclase toxin elicits neutralizing antibodies. Neutralizing antibodies can block binding of the toxin to CR3. Antibodies against adenylate cyclase toxin are also present in the serum of humans infected with B. pertussis.

Adenylate cyclase toxin based constructs have been proven to elicit the production of neutralizing antibodies, but lack the cytotoxicity associated with the complete toxin. Genetically detoxified adenylate cyclase toxin also serves in promoting the Th1/Th17 response, acting as an adjuvant.

== Other roles for adenylate cyclase toxin ==
Adenylate cyclase toxin, or its parts, also serve as a tool for cell biologists. The AC domain finds use as a reporter protein. This reporter activity is based on activating cAMP production if translocated into a cell, conjugated to a studied protein. The AC domain consists of two subdomains, both are required for cAMP production. Conjugating each subdomain to a different protein allows protein-protein interactions to be studied, because cAMP production indicates close interaction of the proteins. Similarly, the two subdomains can be linked by a studied protein, which is then digested by proteases. Loss of cAMP production indicates cleavage by protease.
