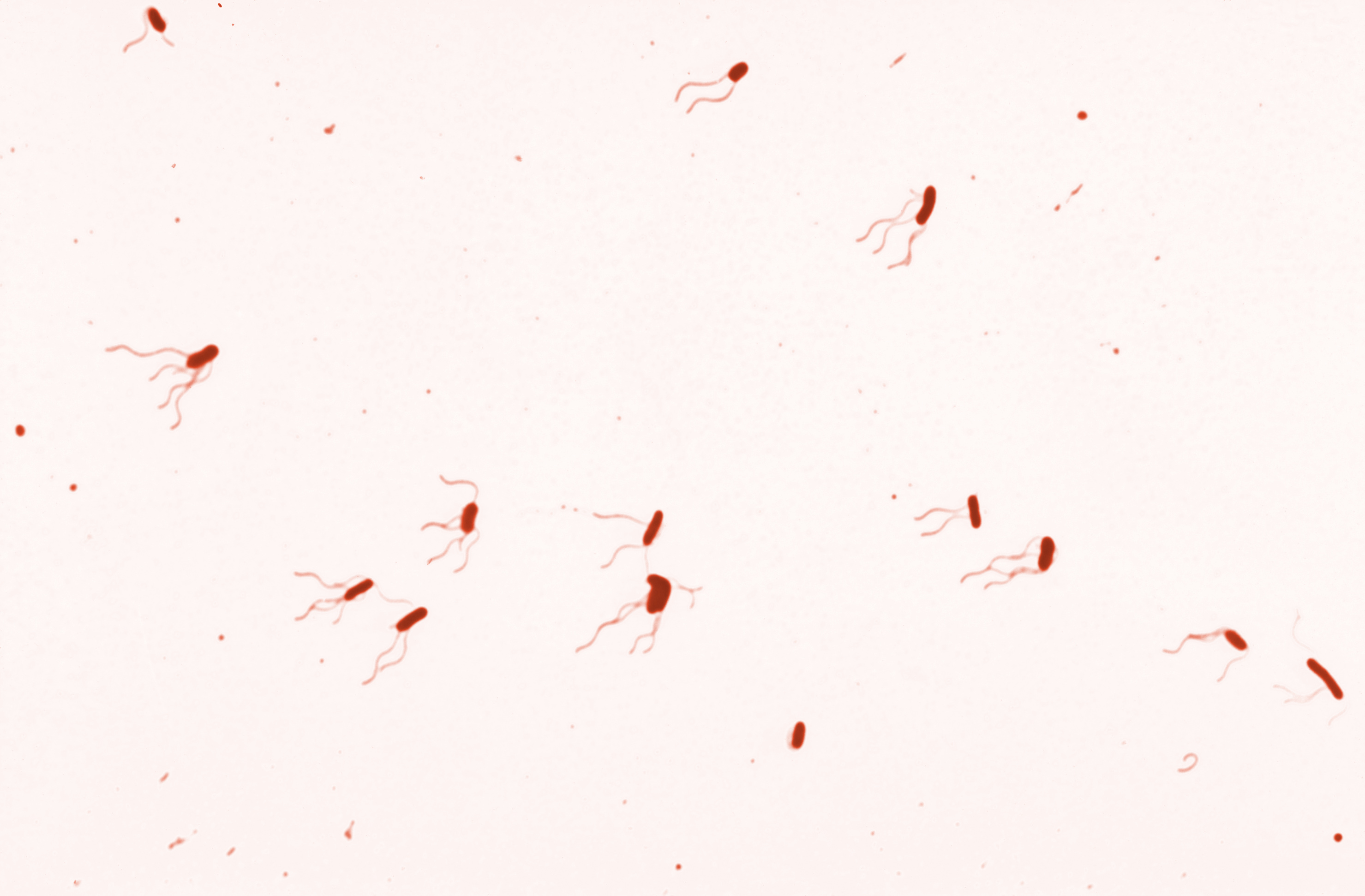
- Flagellated Bordetella bronchiseptica

Scientific classification
- Domain: Bacteria
- Kingdom: Pseudomonadati
- Phylum: Pseudomonadota
- Class: Betaproteobacteria
- Order: Burkholderiales
- Family: Alcaligenaceae
- Genus: Bordetella; Moreno-López 1952

Species
- Bordetella ansorpii; Bordetella atropi; Bordetella avium; Bordetella bronchialis; Bordetella bronchiseptica; Bordetella flabilis; Bordetella hinzii; Bordetella holmesii; Bordetella muralis; Bordetella parapertussis; Bordetella pertussis; Bordetella petrii; Bordetella pseudohinzii; Bordetella sputigena; Bordetella trematum; Bordetella tumbae; Bordetella tumulicola

= Bordetella =

Genus of bacteria

Bordetella (/ˌbɔːrdəˈtɛlə/) is a genus of small (0.2 – 0.7 μm), Gram-negative, coccobacilli bacteria of the phylum Pseudomonadota. Bordetella species, with the exception of B. petrii, are obligate aerobes, as well as highly fastidious, or difficult to culture. All species can infect humans. The first three species to be described (B. pertussis, B. parapertussis, B. bronchiseptica) are sometimes referred to as the 'classical species'. Two of these (B. pertussis and B. bronchiseptica) are also motile.

There are about 16 different species of Bordetella likely descending from ancestors who lived in soil and/or water environments. B. pertussis and occasionally B. parapertussis cause pertussis (whooping cough) in humans, and some B. parapertussis strains only colonize sheep. It has also been known to cause bronchitis in cats and bronchopneumonia in pigs.

B. bronchiseptica rarely infects healthy humans, though disease in immunocompromised patients has been reported. B. bronchiseptica causes several diseases in other mammals, including kennel cough in dogs and atrophic rhinitis in pigs. Other members of the genus cause similar diseases in other mammals, and in birds (B. hinzii, B. avium).

The genus Bordetella is named after Jules Bordet.

== Pathogenesis ==
The three most common species of Bordetella are B. pertussis, B. parapertussis and B. bronchiseptica. These species are known to accumulate in the respiratory tracts of mammals. This is most commonly seen in human infants as a product of an illness known as whooping cough. The particular species responsible for this illness is B. pertussis, and can only be found in humans. Even with extensive vaccination research on B. pertussis, whooping cough is still considered endemic in many countries. Due to the fact B. pertussis is only found in humans and shows little genetic variation from the other Bordetella species, it is thought that it was derived from a common ancestor in recent years.

B. parapertussis can affect both humans and other mammals, primarily sheep. Similar to B. pertussis, it causes whooping cough in babies. Yet, when strains found in sheep are isolated there is a strong distinction between those found in humans. This suggests that the varying strains of this species evolved independently of one another, the one found in humans and the one found in sheep. With this particular distinction it means that there is little to no transmission between the two reservoirs.

The species B. bronchiseptica (gram-negative, aerobic) however has a broader host range, causing similar symptoms in a wide range of animals, while only occasionally affecting humans. These symptoms often manifest as chronic and asymptomatic respiratory infections. B. bronchiseptica is a small, coccobacillus shape sized at approximately 0.5 μm. It has peritrichous flagella that enables it to be motile. On a petri dish, colonies of this species appear small, grayish-white, smooth, and shiny. This species is also typically associated with kennel cough (Canine Respiratory Infectious Disease (CRID)) in dogs.

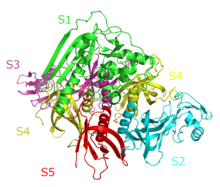
Molecular structure of pertussis toxin complex (protein) highlighting alpha helices and beta pleated sheets. Also including the 5 different sub-units.

The most thoroughly studied of the Bordetella species are B. bronchiseptica, B. pertussis and B. parapertussis, and the pathogenesis of respiratory disease caused by these bacteria has been reviewed. Transmission occurs by direct contact, via respiratory aerosol droplets, or fomites. Bacteria initially adhere to ciliated epithelial cells in the nasopharynx, and this interaction with epithelial cells is mediated by a series of protein adhesins. These include filamentous haemagglutinin, pertactin, fimbriae, and pertussis toxin (though expression of pertussis toxin is unique to B. pertussis). As well as assisting in adherence to epithelial cells, some of these are also involved in attachment to immune effector cells.

The initial catarrhal phase of infection produces symptoms similar to those of the common cold, and during this period, large numbers of bacteria can be recovered from the pharynx. Thereafter, the bacteria proliferate and spread further into the respiratory tract, where the secretion of toxins causes ciliostasis and facilitates the entry of bacteria to tracheal/bronchial ciliated cells. One of the first toxins to be expressed is tracheal cytotoxin, which is a disaccharide-tetrapeptide derived from peptidoglycan. Unlike most other Bordetella toxins, tracheal cytotoxin is expressed constitutively, being a normal product of the breakdown of the bacterial cell wall. Other bacteria recycle this molecule back into the cytoplasm, but in Bordetella and Neisseria gonorrhoeae, it is released into the environment. Tracheal cytotoxin itself is able to reproduce paralysis of the ciliary escalator, inhibition of DNA synthesis in epithelial cells and ultimately killing of the same. One of the most important of the regulated toxins is adenylate cyclase toxin, which aids in the evasion of innate immunity. The toxin is delivered to phagocytic immune cells upon contact. Immune cell functions are then inhibited in part by the resulting accumulation of cyclic AMP. Recently discovered activities of adenylate cyclase toxin, including transmembrane pore formation and stimulation of calcium influx, may also contribute to the intoxication of phagocytes.

== Virulence factors ==
The virulence factors identified in the Bordetella are common to all three species. These include adhesins, such as filamentous hemagglutinin (FHA), pertactin, tracheal colonization factor and fimbriae, and toxins, such as adenylate cyclase-hemolysin, dermonecrotic toxin and tracheal cytotoxin. These factors are then expressed and regulated most often by environmental stimuli. Differences in virulence factors relate to the loss of regulatory or control functions. Bordetella sp. is typically found to live within the hosts' respiratory tract and immune system and can transmit to new hosts. Bordetella pertussis also affects human adults and even with an 85% vaccination coverage over 160,000 related deaths occur each year all around the globe. There are few antimicrobial susceptibility testing methods but no change or progress have been discovered as of 2018. Most studies performed using Bordetella vaccines have many flaws and fail to come to an official conclusion.

== Regulation of virulence factor expression ==
The expression of many Bordetella adhesins and toxins is controlled by the two-component regulatory system BvgAS. Much of what is known about this regulatory system is based on work with B. bronchiseptica, but BvgAS is present in B. pertussis, B. parapertussis and B. bronchiseptica and is responsible for phase variation or phenotypic modulation.

BvgS is a plasma membrane-bound sensor kinase which responds to stimulation by phosphorylating a cytoplasmic helix-turn-helix-containing protein, BvgA. When phosphorylated, BvgA has increased affinity for specific binding sites in Bvg-activated promoter sequences and is able to promote transcription in in vitro assays.

Most of the toxins and adhesins under BvgAS control are expressed under Bvg^{+} conditions (high BvgA-P_{i} concentration). But there are also genes expressed solely in the Bvg^{−} state, most notably the flagellin gene flaA. The regulation of Bvg repressed genes is mediated by the product of a 624-bp open reading frame downstream of BvgA, the so-called Bvg-activated repressor protein, BvgR. BvgR binds to a consensus sequence present within the coding sequences of at least some Bvg-repressed genes. Binding of this protein to the consensus sequence represents gene expression by reducing transcription.

It is not known what the physiological signals for BvgS are, but in vitro BvgAS can be inactivated by millimolar concentrations of magnesium sulfate or nicotinic acid, or by reduction of the incubation temperature to ≤ 26 °C.

The identification of a specific point mutation in the BvgS gene which locks B. bronchiseptica in an intermediate Bvg phase revealed a class of BvgAS-regulated genes that are exclusively transcribed under intermediate concentrations of BvgA-P_{i}. This intermediate (Bvg_{i}) phenotype can be reproduced in wild-type B. bronchiseptica by growth of the bacteria in a medium containing intermediate concentrations of the BvgAS modulator, nicotinic acid. In these conditions, some, but not all of the virulence factors associated with the Bvg^{+} phase are expressed, suggesting this two-component regulatory system can give rise to a continuum of phenotypic states in response to the environment.

== Vaccines ==
The Bordetella vaccine is non-essential, but highly recommended for dogs especially if they are expected to come into contact with other dogs at dog parks, boarding facilities, dog shows, training classes, etc. In fact, it can be required at certain facilities for entry. The vaccine can also be given to cats, but it is less commonly done because infection appears to be uncommon in adult cats. However, it may be a good idea to vaccinate a kitten if it is in a high-risk environment (i.e. living with multiple other cats).

The Bordetella vaccine specifically targets Bordetella bronchiseptica, the species typically responsible for kennel cough. The vaccine introduces the bacteria (live or dead) to the body in order to develop an immunity. It is important to remember that the vaccine only protects against one species of Bordetella. Therefore, it is possible for a pet to become infected with another Bordetella species or contract kennel cough from another source, such as the parainfluenza virus, even after being vaccinated for B. bronchiseptica. The Bordetella vaccine is also only about 70% effective.

There are three licensed ways to deliver the Bordetella vaccine to dogs: orally, intranasally, and subcutaneously. The two former methods are administered using live bacteria, while the latter is done with a killed bacteria. A comparative study done in 2013 by the School of Veterinary Medicine in Madison, Wisconsin studied the effectiveness of these three methods by vaccinating beagle puppies. The 40 beagles were divided into four groups; a group to test each of the three methods, plus one unvaccinated control group. After 42 days, the dogs were exposed to Bordetella bronchiseptica. This study determined that the live intranasal Bordetella vaccine was more effective than the killed subcutaneous vaccine, and the live oral vaccine works equally as well as the live intranasal vaccine.
