= Auto carrier =

Auto carrier, auto transporter, car carrier, or car transporter may refer to:

== Transportation ==
- Autorack, in American English usage, a railroad car for transporting automobiles and light trucks
- Car transporter (rail), in UK English usage, a flat wagon railroad car for transporting automobiles and vans
- Car carrier trailer, a trailer or semi-trailer designed to transport passenger vehicles via truck
- Roll-on/roll-off, a ship designed to transport wheeled cargo, including new cars and other motor vehicles
- Auto Carriers Ltd., now AC Cars, a British automobile manufacturer
- SS Autocarrier, launched 1931, the first container ship

== Biology ==
- Autotransporter protein, see Type V secretion system, T5SS
- Autotransporter domain
