= Extracellular adenylate cyclase =

Enzyme

Extracellular adenylate cyclase is an adenylate cyclase produced by Bordetella pertussis.
