= DNT =

DNT may refer to:

== Science, technology and medicine ==
=== Chemistry ===
- Dermonecrotic toxin, a toxin
- Dinitrotoluene, a chemical precursor to TNT

=== Medicine ===
- Double-negative T cell, a thymocyte in an early stage of development
- Dysembryoplastic neuroepithelial tumour, a type of brain tumour

=== Computing ===
- Do Not Track, a proposed HTTP header, to disable tracking by web services

== Places ==
- Dallas North Tollway, Texas, USA
- Dent railway station, by National Rail station code

== Other uses ==
- Denotified tribes of India
- Norwegian Trekking Association (Norwegian: Den Norske Turistforening)
- Duluth News Tribune, a newspaper in Duluth, Minnesota, USA
- Druk Nyamrup Tshogpa, a political party in Bhutan

== See also ==
- Trinitrotoluene (TNT), an explosive chemical compound
