= Bordetella holmesii =

Scientific classification
- Domain: Bacteria
- Kingdom: Pseudomonadati
- Phylum: Pseudomonadota
- Class: Betaproteobacteria
- Order: Burkholderiales
- Family: Alcaligenaceae
- Genus: Bordetella
- Species: B. holmesii

Binomial name
- Bordetella holmesii Weyant et al., 1994

Species of bacterium

Bordetella holmesii is a Gram-negative, rod-shaped bacterium of the genus Bordetella. It was named in recognition of Barry Holmes, a biologist. It is asaccharolytic, oxidase-negative, and nonmotile, producing a brown pigment. It is associated with sepsis, endocarditis, and respiratory illness, especially in immunocompromised patients, such as asplenic or AIDS patients. It is often seen in conjunction with Bordetella pertussis infections (whooping cough), although not always.
