= Petrii =

Petrii may refer to:

- Bordetella petrii, species of bacteria
- Stenodactylus petrii, species of gecko
