= FHA =

FHA may refer to:

- Fair Housing Act, part of the United States Civil Rights Act of 1968
- Federal Housing Administration, a United States government agency within the Department of Housing and Urban Development
- Federal Highway Administration, a division of the United States Department of Transportation more commonly known by "FHWA"
- Filamentous haemagglutinin adhesin, a large and filamentous protein
- Forkhead-associated domain, a recognition domain found in certain regulatory proteins
- Foundation for Humanity's Adulthood; see Tim Macartney-Snape
- Fraser Health Authority, a publicly funded health care Regions in British Columbia, Canada
- Full Height Anamorphic widescreen, a video technique used to store a 16:9 picture in a 4:3 frame
- Functional hypothalamic amenorrhea
- Future Homemakers of America (FHA) was a national organization of high school clubs focused on home economics, now known as the Family, Career and Community Leaders of America
- SS Führungshauptamt, the operational headquarters of the SS in Nazi Germany
