= Bordetella avium =

Scientific classification
- Domain: Bacteria
- Kingdom: Pseudomonadati
- Phylum: Pseudomonadota
- Class: Betaproteobacteria
- Order: Burkholderiales
- Family: Alcaligenaceae
- Genus: Bordetella
- Species: B. avium

Binomial name
- Bordetella avium Kersters et al. 1984

Type strain
- 197N, ATCC BAA-1003

Species of bacterium

Bordetella avium is a gram negative, nonfermentative, strictly aerobic, motile bacterium from the genus Bordetella which has been isolated from patients with respiratory disease (cystic fibrosis). B. avium has a global distribution, that mainly affects young domesticated turkeys. The disease in birds is called bordetellosis, and is largely associated with confined spaces and multi-aged flocks where management practices are sub optimal. In most infections, mortality is typically low but morbidity is very high.

The pathogenesis of B. avium is through fimbrial attachment to the respiratory epithelium and release of a variety of virulence factors, leading to respiratory symptoms, such as sneezing, ocular and nasal discharge, and inflammation. Further complications include edema, tracheal collapse, and decreased growth rate. Bordetellosis has a major impact on turkey health within turkey production systems but the impact in wild birds is not yet well defined. Good management practice and biosecurity protocols are essential for controlling disease caused by B. avium as the efficacy of antibiotics treatments for disease are variable, and prevention with vaccinations may not provide complete protection.

== Microbial Characteristics ==
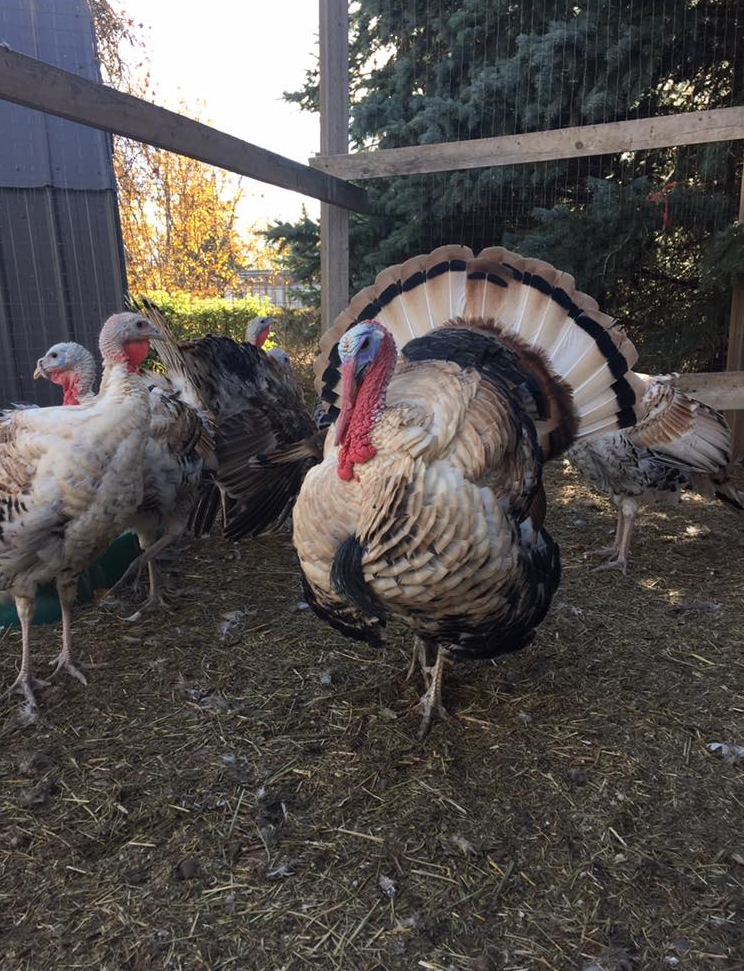
Barnyard turkey flock, photographed in Saskatchewan, Canada. Turkeys are the primary domestic species affected by Bordetella avium.

Bordetella avium like other Bordetellae is a gram negative coccobacillus. This genus is characterized by small aerobic bacteria (with the exception of B. petrii which is an anaerobe) that are oxidase and catalase positive and nitrate reduction and urease negative. Bordetellae species produce two conserved toxins with a variety of additional toxins, individual to each species. Unlike other Bordetellae, B. avium is motile and can grow in a filamentous form when grown in nutrient rich broth. Pathogenic strains grow readily on a variety of media including chocolate and trypticase soy agar, but MacConkey agar is recommended to differentiate this non fermentative bacterium from other fermentative species. Whereas passage attenuated colonies typically have a roughened surface; Pathogenic B. avium produces pearlescent colonies of 200-1000μm in diameter. When grown on MacConkey agar, pathogenic isolates often develop a darkened raised center.

== Epidemiology ==
Turkey farming is a large industry with nearly 165 million kilograms of turkey products produced in Canada alone in 2019 . In the Turkey Health Survey released annually by the United States Animal Health Association B. avium has ranked between 5th and 8th over the past 5 years making it a remarkable issue for production health management .

Bordetella avium has a worldwide distribution but is found at the highest density in the North Temperate Zone, between the arctic circle and the Tropic of Cancer where the climate is most conducive to transfer. Seasonality of outbreaks are most often recorded during the summer and fall months. Outbreaks have been recorded in many countries including the United States, Canada, Australia, Germany, France, and South Africa. When infections do occur nearly all of the flock becomes affected leading to a high reported morbidity with low mortality. Severity of disease can be exacerbated by adverse environmental conditions (low temperature, high ammonia and dust, low humidity) and secondary bacterial infections; increasing mortality up to 40% or 60%. It is uncommon to see outbreaks in breeder flocks, but up to 20% morbidity with no mortality is reported. Furthermore, the bacterium is highly contagious and transmissible and the prevalence in bird species is abundant. Small backyard turkey flocks a mile from large commercial farms have shown isolated infections of B. avium. B. avium is not able to transmit via vertical transmission, but it can transmit by direct contact between birds and remain in the environment in litter, food, and water for as long as 6 months.B. avium also has a short incubation of only 7–10 days allowing for easy and rapid transmission.

Although birds of all ages are susceptible, prevalence is highest and most well understood in domesticated turkeys, especially in the younger populations consisting of birds 1–6 weeks old. It is thought that birds who reach 5–6 weeks of age become relatively resistant to the clinical disease bordetellosis, yet, they can remain carriers among the flock. In addition, much of the transmission is thought to relate to management practices and outbreaks are often associated with farms having confined spaces and flocks consisting of animals of varying ages. It is recommended that to limit disease transmission turkey farmers avoid multi-age flocks.

Although less common, B. avium can also transmit to chickens as an opportunistic infection, and wildlife species where prevalence is still being evaluated. It has been suggested that wildlife species act mainly as a reservoir and it is unclear if B. avium acts as part of the normal flora in wild bird populations or is a causative agent of disease. Despite the fact that wild birds are commonly asymptomatic, Bordetellosis has been reported in a variety of wild birds including parrot finches, partridges, cockatiels, and ostriches, among others. In a study by Raffel et.al, in a sample of 46 Canada geese, 67% tested positive for B. avium using a serum agglutination test for antibodies.

Beyond what is discussed here, many other studies have begun to look at characterizing the epidemiology of this bacterium. There is a strong interest in understanding the prevalence in different countries and prevalence among different species of domestic and wild birds. Understanding the epidemiology of this bacterium is of great importance to turkey producers as it remains one of the top 10 issues in domesticated turkeys. Unfortunately, as research stands, the full epidemiological understanding of this bacterium remains to be fully understood.

== Virulence Factors ==
B. avium exhibits its pathogenesis by attaching to the cilia on the respiratory epithelium of its host where it releases a number of cytotoxins capable of causing damage to the tracheal cartilage and associated structures. Components enabling its attachment include pili, filamentous hemagglutinin, fimbriae, protein autotransporters, outer membrane proteins such as pertactin, and other lipopolysaccharide structures. The genes encoding for many of these proteins, such as fhaB (filamentous hemagglutinin) and fimA (fimbriae), as well as genes responsible for regulating the expression of virulence factors, such as bvgA (Bordetella virulence gene), have been identified and detected on confirmed isolates of B. avium.

Identified cytotoxins produced by B. avium include an osteotoxin, a tracheal cytotoxin, a non-proteolytic dermonecrotic toxin that has been associated with nasal turbinate atrophy in pigs, and adenylate cyclase hemolysin with antiphagocytic activity. The osteotoxin is known to be cytotoxic for osteogenic cells and rat osteosarcoma cells, in addition to embryonic tracheal cells and fetal bovine trabecular cells. Its cytotoxic effect is achieved through the cleavage of L-cystine to form reactive sulfane-containing metabolites, which are then attached to proteins that are critical for the cell's survival. Virulence also requires iron, which is acquired through the use of heme receptors, siderophore receptors, and transferrin-binding proteins.

== Clinical Significance ==
The typical host for Bordetella avium is the turkey. In turkeys this bacteria primarily leads to inflammation of the respiratory mucosa; clinically this can present as sneezing, altered breathing, lower growth rate, vocalization changes, clear discharge from the eyes and nose, tracheal collapse, and submandibular edema. These clinical signs are typically evident within 7–10 days after infection. In addition, their behaviour may change such that they are less active and will search out heat sources. On necropsy turkeys commonly have softened tracheal rings, mucus in the trachea and sinuses dorsal to the tracheal bifurcation, and hemorrhage present on the tracheal lining.

B. avium has also been isolated from other wild and domesticated birds including chickens, mallards, Canada geese, cockatiels, and ostriches. It is uncertain if this bacterium causes disease in all these birds or if it is a part of their normal microbial flora. Chickens have been shown to be affected, however, they are not as severely affected with Bordetellosis as turkeys are. Most often this disease presents as severe respiratory disease in broilers, especially when they are concurrently infected with other respiratory viruses. Cockatiels and ostriches also have been shown to develop the disease but it has not yet been studied to determine how the disease presents in these birds.

As the severity of disease increases the most common comorbidity associated with Bordetella avium is a secondary infection with E. coli. B. avium is also thought to decrease an individual's ability to clear secondary organisms from the trachea which allows them to set up an infection.

Zoonosis

B. avium is an opportunistic pathogen in humans and can cause respiratory disease, such as pneumonia, in immunocompromised patients. B. avium has also been isolated from human patients with cystic fibrosis (CF), however it is currently unclear if this bacteria is involved in the disease process of CF.

== Control and Treatment ==
Environmental contamination is an important route of infection for B. avium. B. avium can survive in the environment less than 2 days at higher temperatures (40 °C), up to a month with low temperature (10 °C) and humidity (32-58%), and up to 6 months in feed, water and damp litter. Good bio-security protocols, thorough cleaning, and excellent husbandry practices are the best methods for controlling outbreaks. Optimal temperature, humidity, and control of ammonia and dust are critical to reduce B.avium growth in the environment and reduce irritants to the tracheal epithelium. Most common disinfectants used do kill B. avium, and thorough cleaning includes removal of litter and other fomites between flocks, disinfection of the barn and flushing of water lines with disinfectants, and fumigation with methyl-bromide or formaldehyde. Foot baths, using on farm-clothing, controlling traffic between barns, preventing contact with wild birds, and showers between sites also reduces transmission between farms. For infected flocks, increasing ventilation and reaching optimal temperature are key. It has been reported that niacin or 0.016% oxy-halogen added to water lines given early in life reduces the severity of bordetellosis.

Antibiotic treatment is not considered effective for B. avium infections, as there is conflicting evidence for susceptibility; and most turkey poults with B.avium infection without secondary complications will recover from bordetellosis in 4–6 weeks, with resistance formed at 5–6 weeks. The mechanism of bacterial resistance in some strains of B. avium have been recorded: there are resistance genes encoded on plasmids (pRAM resistance genes to tetracycline and 2 sulfonamides) and lack of a penicillin binding protein 3 (PBP3) which drugs bind to, to inhibit cell wall synthesis. Plasmid conjugation between B. avium isolates also occurs. Most isolate strains of B. avium have resistance to a number of antibiotics. Resistance has been elucidated to aztreonam, ampicillin, tetracycline, cephalosporins, penicillins, sulbactam, sulfonamides, streptomycin, carbapenem, imipenem, fluoroquinolones, chloramphenicol, gentamicin, cefoperazone, cefepime, ceftazidime, piperacillin and amikacin. However, some susceptibility has also been shown to ampicillin, amoxicillin, penicillin, ceftiofur, enrofloxacin, norfloxacin, ciprofloxacin, erythromycin, florfenicol, and co-trimoxazole. The difficulty with characterizing antibiotic resistance and susceptibility in B. avium strains is most strains will appear sensitive in vitro, but in reality has a much different outcome in vivo. Isolates are believed to be sensitive in vitro but not in vivo due to the inability of the drug to reach therapeutic doses within the tracheal epithelium of turkeys where bacteria dwell.

Two vaccines are available for poultry against B. avium bordetellosis: a temperature sensitive mutant live strain of B.avium and a bacterin isolate vaccine. Bacterins are administered to breeder hens to induce maternal IgG to pass onto their progeny, providing maternal immunity up to 4 weeks in poults. The mutant live-strain is administered to poults twice; at hatchery and then at 2–3 weeks of age. However, vaccines are not known to be very efficacious, and may only protect against severe clinical signs, or delay onset of disease, not stop the spread of infection. Most significant immunity in turkey poults is thought to be acquired humoral immunity at this time. Vaccinations are considered for prevention if there is recurrence in outbreaks of bordetellosis.
