= Bordetella hinzii =

Scientific classification
- Domain: Bacteria
- Kingdom: Pseudomonadati
- Phylum: Pseudomonadota
- Class: Betaproteobacteria
- Order: Burkholderiales
- Family: Alcaligenaceae
- Genus: Bordetella
- Species: B. hinzii

Binomial name
- Bordetella hinzii Vandamme et al. 1995

Type strain
- ATCC 51783, Blackall TC 58, CCM 4584, CCUG 33847, CIP 104527, DSM 11333, JCM 15550, LMG 13501, P.J. Blackall TC58

Species of bacterium

Bordetella hinzii is a Gram-negative, oxidase+ and catalase-positive, short rod-shaped bacterium from the genus Bordetella isolated from a patient who suffered from cystic fibrosis and from the trachea and lungs of a laboratory mouse.
