= Bordet–Gengou agar =

Bacteriologic medium

Bordet–Gengou agar is a type of agar plate optimized to isolate Bordetella, containing blood, potato extract, and glycerol, with an antibiotic such as cephalexin or penicillin and sometimes nicotinamide. The potato extract provided nitrogen and vitamins, and potato starch absorbed fatty acids present in nasal secretions or collection-swab cotton that inhibited growth; glycerol was a carbon source. Medical Microbiology, 4th edition, states that Regan-Lowe medium (containing charcoal, blood, and antibiotic) has replaced Bordet–Gengou medium as the medium of choice for routine Bordetella pertussis incubation.

Bordetella bacteria were difficult to culture; Jules Bordet and Octave Gengou invented the first version to isolate the coccobacillus, named Bordet–Gengou in 1906, they believed was associated with whooping cough. In 1909, it was not yet established that the coccobacillus was solely the cause.
