= Octave Gengou =

Belgian bacteriologist (1875–1957)

- Born: February 27, 1875; Ouffet, Belgium
- Died: April 25, 1957 (aged 82); Antwerp, Belgium
- Known for: Discovery of Bordetella pertussis; Development of Bordet–Gengou agar; First whole-cell pertussis vaccine; Complement fixation test
- Scientific career
- Fields: Bacteriology; Serology; Immunology

Octave Gengou (27 February 1875, Ouffet – 25 April 1957, Brussels) was a Belgian bacteriologist. He researched with Jules Bordet the Bordetella pertussis bacteria.

== Biography ==
At the age of 22, he obtained his doctorate at the University of Liège, later being named as deputy director at the Pasteur Institute of Brabant. In 1945, he became professor emeritus at the University of Brussels.

Gengou worked at the Belgium Pasteur Institute in Brussels. With Jules Bordet he isolated Bordetella pertussis in pure culture in 1906 and declared it as the cause of whooping cough. In 1912, he developed the first whooping cough-vaccine. He also worked on various important fundamental research on a now common test for diseases (e.g. the "Wassermann test" of August von Wassermann).

He served as secretary general of the Oeuvre Nationale Belge contre la Tuberculose and as an honorary president of the Ligue nationale belge contre la Tuberculose.

== Published works ==
With Jules Bordet, he collaborated on the following works:

- Contribution à l'étude de la coagulation du sang, 1903 – Contribution to the study of blood coagulation.
- Le Microbe de la coqueluche, 1906 – The microbe "pertussis".
- Note complémentaire sur le microbe de la coqueluche, 1906 – Additional notes on the microbe "pertussis".
- L'Endotoxine coquelucheuse, 1909 – The pertussis endotoxin.
- Etiologie de la coqueluche. Etat actuel de la question, 1909 – Etiology of pertussis. Current status of the question.
- La Coagglutination des globules rouges par les mélanges des anticorps et des antigènes albumineux, 1911 – Coagglutination of red blood cells by mixtures of albumin antibodies and antigens.
- Le Diagnostic de la coqueluche fruste par la méthode de la fixation d'alexine, 1911.

== See also ==
- Immunology
- Bacteriologist
