= Bordetella ansorpii =

Scientific classification
- Domain: Bacteria
- Kingdom: Pseudomonadati
- Phylum: Pseudomonadota
- Class: Betaproteobacteria
- Order: Burkholderiales
- Family: Alcaligenaceae
- Genus: Bordetella
- Species: B. ansorpii

Binomial name
- Bordetella ansorpii

Type strain
- SMC-8986

Species of bacterium

Bordetella ansorpii is a Gram-negative, oxidase-negative bacterium from the genus Bordetella which has been isolated from the purulent exudate of an epidermal cyst of an immunocompromised patient. A 16S rRNA gene analysis has confirmed B. ansorpii belongs to this genus.
