= Whole-cell vaccine =

Type of vaccine

Whole-cell vaccines are a type of vaccine that has been prepared in the laboratory from entire cells. Such vaccines simultaneously contain multiple antigens to activate the immune system. They induce antigen-specific T-cell responses.

Whole-cell vaccines have been researched in the fields of bacterial infectious disease (as an inactivated vaccine) and cancer (as tumor cells modified to stimulate the immune system by secreting stimulatory molecules). One whole-cell vaccine that sees global use is the whole-cell pertussis vaccine.

== Against infectious disease ==
=== Pertussis ===
The causative organism of pertussis is Bordetella pertussis. The whole-cell pertussis vaccine is effective and safe in treating this disease but is also associated with short-term side effects. Depending upon the different B. pertussis antigens, the immune response produced by the whole-cell vaccine also varies. The pertussis whole-cell vaccine contains inactivated bacterial cells that contain antigens like pertussis toxin, adenylate cyclase toxin, lipooligosaccharides and agglutinogens. The whole-cell pertussis vaccine is prepared by growing Bordetella pertussis in a liquid medium. After the inactivation of the bacteria, a specific cellular concentration is aliquoted. The vaccine efficacy ranges between 36 and 98%.

==== Advantages over acellular pertussis vaccine ====
- Whole-cell pertussis vaccine stimulates natural infection better than the acellular pertussis vaccine.
- Even though cell-mediated immunity persists in patients received with the acellular pertussis vaccine, stronger lymphocytic proliferation, specifically memory T helper 1 cell and T helper 17 cells and cytokine responses are observed in patients received with the whole cell pertussis vaccine.
- The vaccination with whole cell pertussis vaccine ensures the low risks of pulmonary infection and nasal colonization, due to the increased production of Tissue Resident Memory cells.

=== Pneumococcus ===
The whole-cell pneumococcal vaccine consisted of inactive Streptococcus pneumoniae RM200 cells and was the first whole-cell vaccine used against S. pneumoniae. In 2012, Phase-I studies were conducted by combining the whole-cell vaccine with alum. 1 out of 42 experienced adverse reactions which were not related to vaccination. The mild reactions experienced were similar to the control groups. Immunoglobulin G responses to the whole-cell vaccine was determined by pan proteome microassay and found that the whole-cell pneumococcal vaccine induced an increase in IgG response in a naturally immunogenic protein expressed by RM200 and also caused a reaction to PclA, PspC and ZmpB protein variants.

== Against cancer ==
The whole-cell tumour vaccine is based on the logic that tumour cells will contain proteins produced by cancer lesion and will provide multiple antigens for immune recognition. Whole-cell tumour vaccines represent one form of immunotherapy method undergoing clinical development.

To make a whole-cell tumor vaccine, tumor cells from the patient are transduced so that they produce costimulatory molecules such as cytokines, chemokines, and others. The cells are irradiated so they cannot grow like the parent tumor, but can still express the tumor antigens and the additional molecules.

Phase I & II clinical trials of various whole-cell tumour vaccines indicate this method is safe for cancer patients. The advantage of a whole-cell vaccine is that the cells provide a source of all potential antigens, eliminating the need to identify the most optimal antigen to target in a particular type of cancer. Multiple tumour antigens can be targeted simultaneously, generating an immune response to various tumour antigens.

=== Advantages ===
- Whole tumour cell vaccines contain characterised and uncharacterised Tumour Antigen Associated Cells that can be processed Antigen Presenting Cells to stimulate the immune system; this makes the whole tumour cell vaccine different from other antigen-specific vaccines.
- Antigen Presenting Cells can present Tumour Associated Antigens to CD8+ and CD4+ T cells via MHC I & II, respectively. The simultaneous presentation of MHC I & II leads to a robust immune response against tumours.
- Induces immune response to multiple epitopes within an antigenic protein.

=== Disadvantages ===
- The use of whole-tumour cells for vaccine preparation is not very specific because only a portion of the antigens expressed by tumour cells are specific to tumours, and the rest of the antigens are present in normal cells.
- A tumour biopsy is needed to prepare autologous tumour cell vaccines. In some cases, the cells obtained through tumour biopsy may not be sufficient, or the tumour cells might have undergone necrosis.
- The Tumour Associated Antigens present in whole tumour cell vaccines can release immunosuppressive cytokines like TGF-β, inhibiting the development of proper immune response.
- The CD8+ T cell presented by MHC-I does not elicit a response against tumour antigens due to a lack of expression of costimulatory molecules like CD80 & CD86 in these cancer cells.

=== Mode of action ===
The whole tumour cell vaccine consists of the identified and unidentified tumour antigens. Antigen-presenting cells present these tumour antigens via Major Histocompatibility Complex Class I & II to CD8+ T lymphocytes and CD4+T lymphocytes, respectively. By interacting with the Fas ligand or secretion of lytic enzymes, cytotoxic T lymphocytes can lead to apoptosis. Active CD4+ T cells activate the Natural-killer cells, and also CD4+T cells activate the humoral immune response and also promote the activity of CD8+ T cells. Vaccine-induced immune responses are measured by Delayed type Hypersensitivity responses to autologous tumour cells. The granulocyte-macrophage colony-stimulating factor (GM-CSF) is superior to other cytokines, and the addition of GM-CSF in whole-cell vaccine results in a better response against tumour cells. GM-CSF recruits dendritic cells to the site of irradiated cells and stimulates the antigen uptake, processing and presentation. These dendritic cells facilitate the T-cell response by combining with CD8+ T cells.

== See also ==
- Pertussis vaccine
- Pneumococcal vaccine
