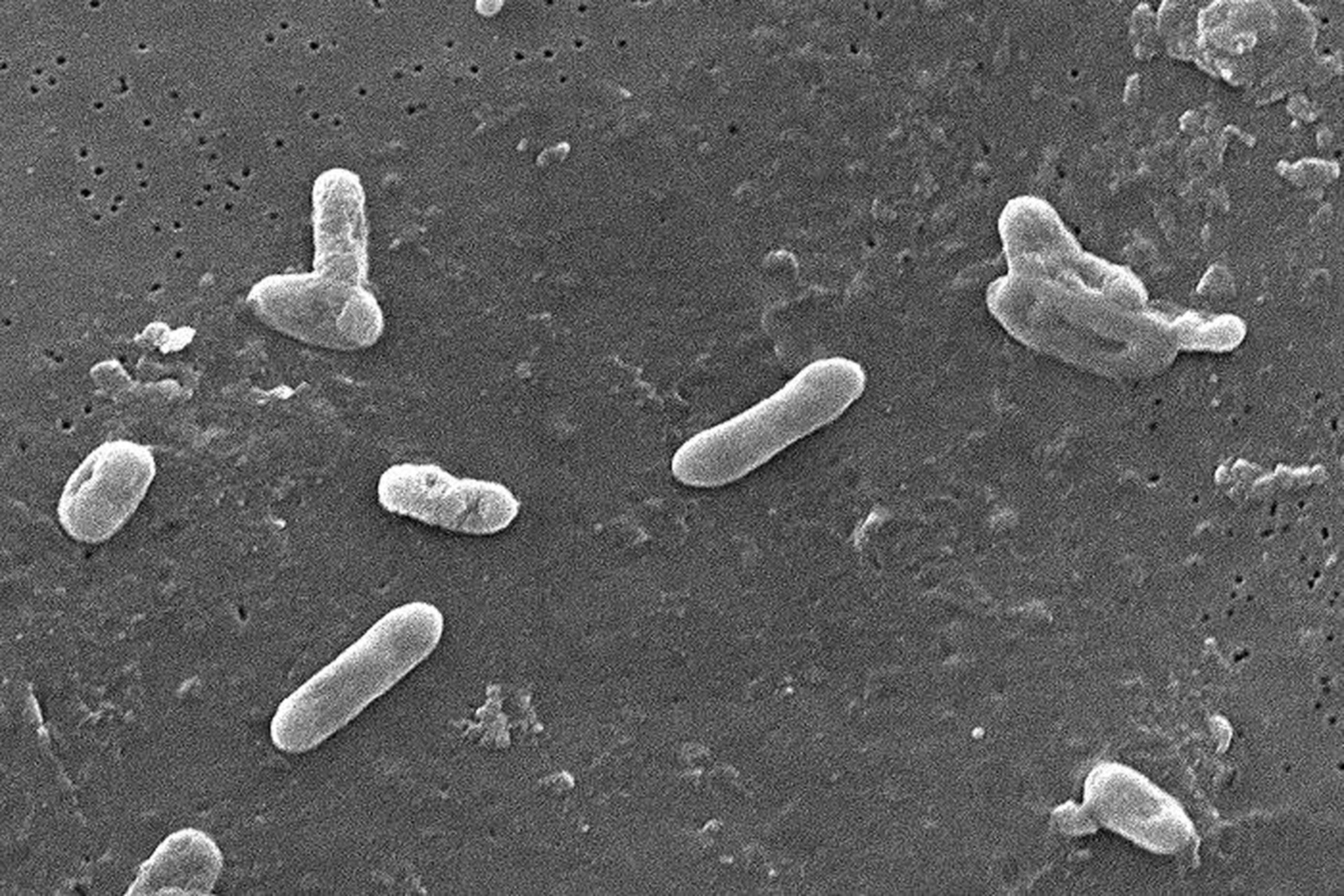
- Scanning electron micrograph of B. bronchiseptica

Scientific classification
- Domain: Bacteria
- Kingdom: Pseudomonadati
- Phylum: Pseudomonadota
- Class: Betaproteobacteria
- Order: Burkholderiales
- Family: Alcaligenaceae
- Genus: Bordetella
- Species: B. bronchiseptica

Binomial name
- Bordetella bronchiseptica (Ferry 1912) Moreno-López 1952

= Bordetella bronchiseptica =

Species of bacterium

Bordetella bronchiseptica is a small, gram-negative, rod-shaped bacterium of the genus Bordetella. It can cause infectious bronchitis in dogs and other animals, but rarely infects humans. Closely related to B. pertussis—the obligate human pathogen that causes pertussis (whooping cough); B. bronchiseptica can persist in the environment for extended periods.

== Pathogenesis ==
Humans are not natural carriers of B. bronchiseptica, which typically infects the respiratory tracts of smaller mammals (cats, dogs, rabbits, etc.). People are more likely to be infected by B. pertussis or B. parapertussis. Unlike B. pertussis, B. bronchiseptica is generally resistant to macrolide antibiotics. It is also generally resistant to cephalosporins. Some human cases have been successfully treated with trimethoprim/sulfamethoxazole and fluoroquinolones.

B. bronchiseptica does not express pertussis toxin, which is one of the characteristic virulence factors of B. pertussis, but it has the genes to do so, highlighting the close evolutionary relationship between the two species.

=== Veterinary pathogenesis ===
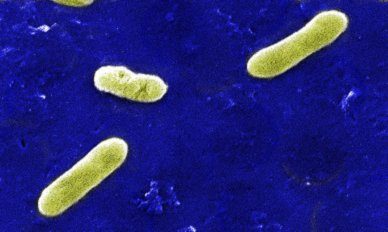
A scanning electron micrograph depicted a number of Gram-negative Bordetella bronchiseptica bacteria

In veterinary medicine, B. bronchiseptica leads to a range of pathologies in different hosts. It is a serious disease of dogs, pigs, and rabbits, and has been seen in cats, horses, and seals. A PCR test for the pathogen exists.

In pigs, B. bronchiseptica and Pasteurella multocida act synergistically to cause atrophic rhinitis, a disease resulting in arrested growth and distortion of the turbinates in the nasal terminus (snout). In dogs, B. bronchiseptica causes acute tracheobronchitis, which typically has a harsh, honking cough. Kennel cough can also be caused by canine adenovirus-2 or canine parainfluenza virus or a combination of pathogens.

In rabbits, B. bronchiseptica is often found in the nasal tract. It is often assumed to cause a nearly asymptomatic infection known as snuffles, but the causative agent for that disease is Pasteurella multocida; B. bronchiseptica often co-infects the nasal passage at the same time.

Cats infected with B. bronchiseptica have been seen with tracheobronchitis, conjunctivitis, and rhinitis (upper respiratory tract infection - URI), mandibular lymphadenopathy, and pneumonia. However, URI in cats can also be caused by herpesvirus, calicivirus, Mycoplasma species, or Chlamydia psittaci. An intranasal vaccine exists for cats.

== Outbreaks ==
=== 2022 outbreak ===
In late 2022, together with the H3N2 strain of canine influenza and other respiratory pathogens, B. bronchiseptica experienced a surge in canine infections. This was partially due to increased human travel and reopened offices following the relaxation of COVID-19 pandemic public health measures, leading to large numbers of dogs being placed together in kennels and doggy day care centers. Changing pet ownership behaviors also led to overcrowded animal shelters, after the pandemic.

== Culture ==
B. bronchiseptica grows readily on Regan-lowe agar. It can be differentiated from the causative agents of whooping cough due to its rapid urease production.
