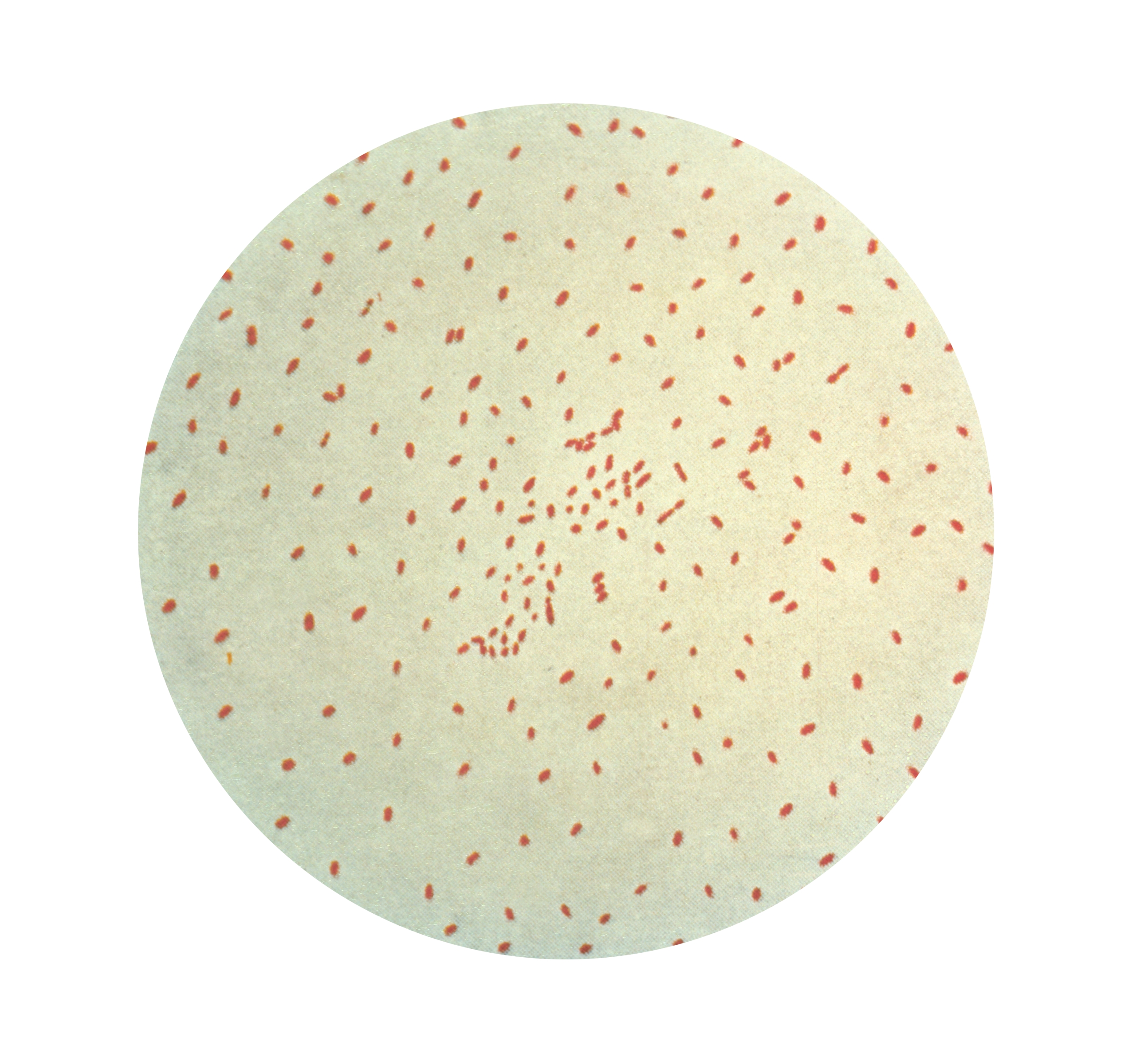
- Gram stain

Scientific classification
- Domain: Bacteria
- Kingdom: Pseudomonadati
- Phylum: Pseudomonadota
- Class: Betaproteobacteria
- Order: Burkholderiales
- Family: Alcaligenaceae
- Genus: Bordetella
- Species: B. pertussis

Binomial name
- Bordetella pertussis (Bergey et al. 1923) Moreno-López 1952

Type strain
- ATCC 9797; CCUG 30873; CIP 63.1; DSM 5571; LMG 14455; NCTC 10739

= Bordetella pertussis =

Species of bacterium causing pertussis or whooping cough

Bordetella pertussis is a Gram-negative, aerobic, pathogenic, encapsulated coccobacillus bacterium of the genus Bordetella. It is the causative agent of pertussis or whooping cough. Despite widespread vaccination, B. pertussis continues to cause illness and death worldwide due to declining immunity and pathogen adaptation. Its virulence factors include pertussis toxin, adenylate cyclase toxin, filamentous haemagglutinin, pertactin, pili, and tracheal cytotoxin.

B. pertussis is an obligate human pathogen and is transmitted through airborne droplets. After exposure, it takes on average 5-10 days for symptoms to appear with the longest duration being 20 days. The bacterium attaches to the ciliated epithelial cells lining the respiratory tract using specialized surface proteins to remain in place. It then releases toxins that disrupt normal cellular functions and cause symptoms in its human host, the only known reservoir for B. pertussis.

The complete B. pertussis genome of 4,086,186 base pairs was published in 2003. This is smaller than the closely-related species B. bronchiseptica, with a genome of 5.2 million base pairs. On the other hand, similarly to B. bronchiseptica, B. pertussis can express a flagellum-like structure, although it is normally classified as nonmotile bacterium.

== Taxonomy ==
The genus Bordetella contains nine species: B. pertussis, B. parapertussis, B. bronchiseptica, B. avium, B. hinzii, B. holmesii, B. trematum, B. ansorpii, and B. petrii.

B. pertussis, B. parapertussis and B. bronchiseptica form a closely related phylogenetical group. B. parapertussis causes a disease similar to whooping cough in humans, and B. bronchiseptica infects a range of mammal hosts, including humans, and causes a spectrum of respiratory disorders.

== Evolution ==
The causative agent of pertussis (whooping cough) was identified and isolated by Jules Bordet and Octave Gengou in 1906. The Paris outbreak of 1578 is thought to be the oldest pertussis outbreak, as documented by Guillaume de Baillou. Researchers used 16S rRNA gene sequencing data to gain ancestral information, since 16S rRNA is a component of all bacteria. It is believed that the genus Bordetella may have evolved from ancestors that could survive in the soil, with an expansion in agricultural development increasing human-soil interactions. This increase created more advantageous environments for the ancestors of Bordetella to adapt to human hosts. Vaccination was introduced in the 1950s with a resurgence in the early 2010s, due to infant mortality increase. It is also believed that over 300 strains of B. pertussis have been identified worldwide since 1920, analysis of which suggests that the bacteria emerged within the last 500 years. It is also believed that due to widespread use of acellular vaccines, B. pertussis is adapting through immune selection pressure which may cause vaccine escape.

== Genetics ==
It was initially determined that B. pertussis is a monomorphic pathogen in which most strains found had the same two types of alleles: ptxA1 or ptxA2. Modern developments in genome sequencing have allowed B. pertussis to be studied more, allowing for the discovery of the ptxP region. Through studying the gene, a resurfacing of pathogen adaptation is prevalent, as there is a discrepancy between vaccine strains and circulating strains. These strains, mostly containing the ptxP3 allele, contain higher production of the pertussis toxin. It was also revealed that 25% of the genes on the reference strain of the B. pertussis sequence were missing in comparison to the ancestral strains. These mutations were noted to be caused by an increase in intragenomic recombination with loss of DNA. Genes controlled by the BvgAS system have transformed B. pertussis into a much more contagious pathogen. Ultimately, this leads to higher acuteness of the disease when contracted. This has caused an upwards trend of most cases of B. pertussis being the ptxP3 strain, especially in developing countries. Since the 1990s, most cases in developed countries such as the United States have ptxP3 isolates rather than the ptxA1 causing it to become the more dominant strain.

== Growth and Metabolism ==
=== pH Requirements ===
Bordetella pertussis prefers a neutral pH range of 7.0–7.5, which is optimal to thrive in the human body. The max pH level for their growth was at 8.0. The minimum pH range where growth was still possible was at a pH of 6.0-6.5, as the bacteria are not able to reproduce at pH levels lower than 5.0.

=== Culture Conditions ===
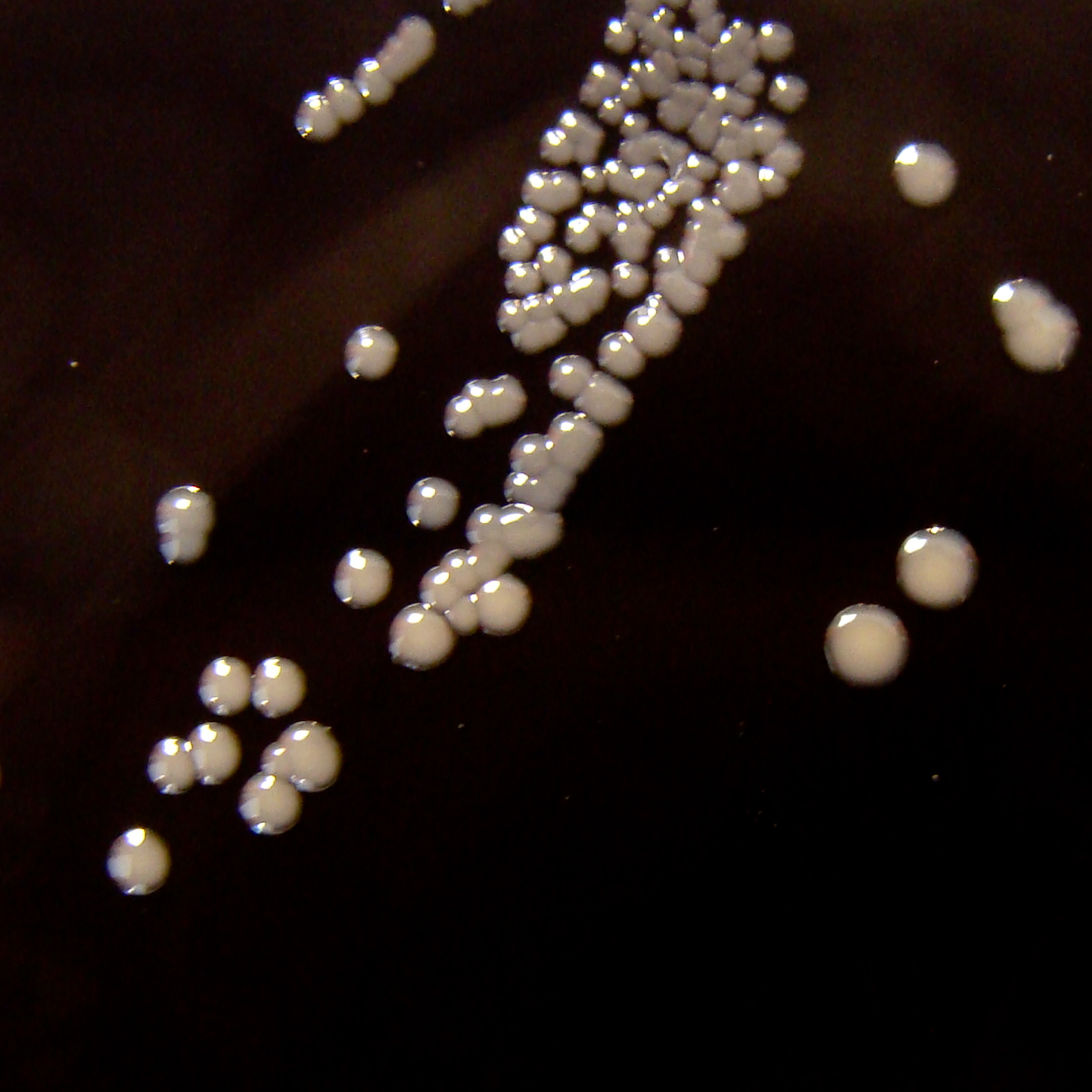

In addition, Bordetella pertussis favors a temperature range of 35 °C to 37 °C, and its nutritional requirements are meticulous in its requirement for nicotinamide supplement. Due to B. Pertussis' specialized media requirements, antimicrobial testing is limited, which can lead to underreporting in clinical settings. It has been identified that the growth of the bacteria is hindered in the presence of fatty acids, peroxide media, metal ions, and sulfides.

As a strict aerobe, the bacterium requires oxygen to grow and sustain. Such aerobes undergo cellular respiration to metabolize substances using oxygen. In such respiration, the terminal electron acceptor for the electron transport chain is oxygen. The organism is oxidase positive, but urease, nitrate reductase, and citrate negative.

It also lowers the level of its BvgAS two-component system, which leads to an expression of virulence genes and an avirulent phenotype. In addition, it can adjust the central and energy metabolism, cell wall reinforcement, maintenance of appropriate redox and metal homeostasis, and repair of damaged macromolecules. Studies have also shown mutants lacking cysteine dioxygenase genes displaying attenuated cytotoxicity toward THP-1 cells, which highlights the role of sulphur metabolism in host-pathogen interactions.

=== Metabolic Pathways ===
B. pertussis presents unique challenges and opportunities for metabolic modeling, especially given its reemergence as a pathogen. Elevated glutamate levels were found to slow growth due to oxidative stress, revealing a complex relationship. This effect is compounded by observations suggesting that a small starting population could amplify oxidative stress through quorum sensing, a phenomenon deserving further investigation.

When B. pertussis is in a balanced medium of lactate and glutamate that does not accumulate ammonium, a partially faulty citric acid cycle in B. pertussis and its ability to synthesize and break down β-hydroxybutyrate is observed. Cultivating B. pertussis in this medium resulted in some production of polyhydroxybutyrate but no excretion of β-hydroxybutyrate, indicating a more efficient conversion of carbon into biomass compared to existing media formulations.

In biofilm conditions, B. pertussis cells exhibited increased toxin levels alongside reduced expression of certain proteins, indicating a metabolic shift towards utilizing the full tricarboxylic acid (TCA) cycle over the glyoxylate shunt. These changes correlated with heightened polyhydroxybutyrate accumulation and superoxide dismutase activity, potentially contributing to prolonged survival in biofilms. Despite a less negative energy profile compared to host tissues like the human respiratory system, B. pertussis efficiently couples biosynthesis with catabolism, sustaining robust growth even after extended incubation periods.

B. pertussis cannot use sugars as a carbon source, so amino acids are used, the main and efficient one being glutamate. Glutamate goes through the TCA cycle once converted by glutamate dehydrogenase. It can also be used for other pathways such as gluconeogenesis.

== Host species ==
Some primate species are highly sensitive to B. pertussis, and develop a clinical whooping cough in high incidence when exposed to low inoculation doses. A 2013 study using mice showed that the infectious dose of B. pertussis was high (10,000 colony forming units (CFU)) compared to B. bronchiseptica, which was less than 100 CFU, and that the commensal bacteria found in the mices' noses inhibited colonization by the B. pertusis bacteria. The authors of the study speculated that this "may also occur in humans". This study furthered the understanding of how B.pertussis interacts with host cells and how microorganisms in the body interact with this bacterium. Whether the bacteria spread naturally in wild animal populations has not been confirmed. In research settings, baboons have been used as a model of the infection although it is not known whether the pathology in baboons is the same as in humans.

== Transmission, infection, and virulence ==
=== Transmission and infection ===
B. pertussis is a highly contagious infection of the respiratory tract. Whooping Cough is estimated to have a basic reproduction number ($R_0$) of 12–17, making the bacteria highly contagious pathogens. However, for B. pertussis to persist in a population the bacterium needs an uninterrupted chain of transmission as there are no animal reservoirs and the bacteria do not survive in the environment. B. pertussis primarily spreads through respiratory droplets, requiring close contact between individuals due to its short survival time outside the body. The infection of B. pertussis occurs mostly in children under the age of one since this is when they are unimmunized, or children with faded immunity, normally around the ages 11 through 18. The signs and symptoms are similar to a common cold: runny nose, sneezing, mild cough, and low-grade fever. The patient becomes most contagious during the catarrhal stage of infection, normally two weeks after the coughing begins. It may become airborne when the person coughs, sneezes, or laughs. The paroxysmal cough precedes a crowing inspiratory sound characteristic of pertussis. After a spell, the patient might make a "whooping" sound when breathing in or may vomit. Transmission rates are expected to rise as the host experiences their most contagious stage when the total viable count of B. pertussis is at its highest. After the host coughs, the bacteria in their respiratory airways will be exposed to the air by way of aerosolized droplets, threatening nearby humans. Because whooping cough triggers intense, repeated coughing fits, this process occurs frequently, making the disease extremely contagious in close-contact environments. The symptoms depend on an individual' immune status. Adults have milder symptoms, such as prolonged coughing without the "whoop". Infants less than six months also may not have the typical whoop. A coughing spell may last a minute or more, producing cyanosis, apnea, and seizures.

A study using Baboons in 2012, was the first to examine the transmission of B. pertussis in a controlled setting. The results concluded that B. pertussis can be transmitted through aerosolized respiratory droplets, not just through direct contact. However, like other airborne illnesses, the time exposed and proximity of exposure determine if the bacteria will infect others.

=== Virulence factors ===
==== Colonization ====
Virulence factors of B. pertussis aid the microbe in its infection of the host. A component of the cell wall, filamentous hemagglutinin (FHA), was found to be the main factor in animal models for fastening to host cells. In human cases, the fimbriae and lipopolysaccharides of B. pertussis have also been postulated to act as adhesins along with FHA, attaching to ciliated epithelial cells in the respiratory tract. Once attached, the ciliated cells are prevented from moving out waste to clear the lungs; without this process it allows for a build up of wastes causing the ‘whooping’ sound during a cough. These include fimbriae that bind to specific integrin antigens that are abundant in the respiratory tract, which has been found to facilitate tracheal occupation in mice. The presence of host antibodies against the fimbriae is seen as a valuable factor in limiting the spread of infection and protection against initial infection.

==== Toxins ====
B. pertussis infects its host by colonizing lung epithelial cells. It produces four different toxins including pertussis toxin, tracheal cytotoxin, adenylate toxin, and dermonecrotic toxin to aid in survival and to cause damage to respiratory tract tissue. The bacterium contains a surface protein, filamentous haemagglutinin adhesin, which binds to the sulfatides found on cilia of epithelial cells. Other adhesins are fimbriae and petractin. Once anchored, the bacterium produces tracheal cytotoxin, which stops the cilia from beating. This prevents the cilia from clearing debris from the lungs, so the body responds by sending the host into a coughing fit. B. pertussis can inhibit the function of the host's immune system.

The toxin, known as pertussis toxin, inhibits G protein coupling that regulates an adenylate cyclase-mediated conversion of ATP to cyclic adenosine monophosphate. The result is that phagocytes convert too much adenosine triphosphate to cyclic adenosine monophosphate, causing disturbances in cellular signaling mechanisms, and preventing phagocytes from correctly responding to the infection. Pertussis toxin, formerly known as lymphocytosis-promoting factor, causes a decrease in the entry of lymphocytes into lymph nodes, which can lead to a condition known as lymphocytosis, with a complete lymphocyte count of over 4000/μl in adults or over 8000/μl in children. Besides targeting lymphocytes, it limits neutrophil migration to the lungs. It also decreases the function of tissue-resident macrophages, which are responsible for some bacterial clearance.

Adenylate cyclase toxin is another enzyme produced by B. pertussis which protects this bacterium from macrophages via nitric oxide by impeding the activity of immune cells. Dermonecrotic toxin produces a vasoconstrictive response in the tissues it infects. The reason for this response is still unknown, but the same toxin has been observed to be produced by similar strands of bacteria like B.parapertussis and B.bronchiseptica and shows the same vasoconstrictive response. All of these toxins work together to present whooping cough symptoms in the host.

== Progression of disease ==
Pertussis manifests in three distinct stages. The dynamic progression of pertussis, characterized by its distinct phases from incubation to paroxysmal coughing, underscores the complexity of the disease's clinical manifestations and highlights the potential significance of toxin release in driving symptoms.

Following exposure, an incubation period of 5–7 days ensues before symptoms appear.

The catarrhal phase follows, characterized by cold-like symptoms lasting about a week, with a high isolation rate of the organism. This phase transitions into the paroxysmal phase, where the dry cough evolves into a severe, paroxysmal cough with mucous secretion and vomiting.

The coughing fits, characterized by efforts to expel respiratory secretions, may result in a distinctive whooping sound. Recovery of the organism diminishes significantly during this phase. Although the organism is seldom detected in the blood, it is theorized that the clinical symptoms primarily stem from toxin release. The paroxysmal phase typically persists for a minimum of 2 weeks.

== Diagnosis ==
B. pertussis is identified from a nasopharynx swab or aspirate. This swab is either analyzed through a bacterial culture or by running a PCR Assay. It may be hard to diagnose pertussis based on symptoms alone, especially if the patient has prior vaccination or infection.

Serology uses patient blood samples to analyze the blood serum to find specific antibodies or other immune system proteins. The test identifies the IgG antibody (specifically, anti-PT IgG) and is advantageous for patients whose cough has persisted for 2-8 weeks. The use of serological tests allows for later detection with a high sensitivity and specificity rate.

Microbiological cultures are the historical gold standard for identifying B. pertussis as it offers 100% specificity. It has the highest probability within the first 3 weeks of coughing in the host, which brings limitations to diagnoses as physical symptoms may not have completely matured. To grow B. pertussis in a lab setting, Stainer-Scholte synthetic brother medium or Bordet-Gengou blood agar can be used. The bacterium prefers aerobic conditions and a temperature range of 35-37 °C. Plates must be cultured for 3-7 days before colonies appear.

Classical PCR Assays are the test of choice when identifying B. pertussis as the procedure is known for its high sensitivity. Unfortunately, it is often inaccurate when identifying between Bordetella species. The primers used for PCR usually target the transposable elements IS481 and IS1001. It cannot detect the pathogens in atypical manifestations and vaccinated patients for longer periods, compared to the culture. Target genes within B. pertussis are IS481, IS1002, ptxS1, Ptx-Pr, and BP3385, however, B. bronchiseptica and B. holmesii contain similar gene expression, leaving it difficult to differentiate between the bacterium in the laboratory. The most effective technique to differentiate between the two bacteria is by human and animal isolates. Singleplex PCR identifies the target gene ptxS1.

Direct Fluorescent Antibody Testing (DFA) is an inexpensive test that provides direct results and identification of B. pertussis by fluorescein-conjugated antibody DFA staining of the nasopharyngeal swab. This method was developed and widely used in the 1960's, but is no longer accepted as proof of infection in notifying countries due to its low specificity.

Several diagnostic tests are available, particularly the enzyme-linked immunosorbent assay ELISA kits. These are designed to detect filamentous hemagglutinin (FHA) and/or anti-pertussis-toxin antibodies of IgG, IgA, or IgM. Some kits use a combination of antigens which leads to a higher sensitivity, but might also make the interpretation of the results harder since one cannot know which antibody has been detected.

Misdiagnosis is common due to diagnostic techniques, misidentification between species in laboratories, and clinician error. The misdiagnoses between Bordetella species further increase the likelihood of antibiotic resistance. These factors highlight the need for a procedure to target all species through specific and fast methods.

== Treatment and prevention ==
=== Treatment ===
Whooping cough is treated by macrolides, for example erythromycin. The therapy is most effective when started during the incubation period or the catarrhal period. It is ideal for treatment should be within 1–2 weeks from onset of symptoms. When applied during the paroxysmal cough phase, the time of convalescence is not affected, only further transmission is reduced to 5–10 days after infection.

=== Prevention ===
Pertussis vaccine has been widely used since the second half of the 20th century. The first vaccines were whole-cell vaccines (wP), composed of chemically inactivated bacteria and given intramuscularly. When given, the inactive bacteria and antigens trigger the immune response and mimic natural infection.

Due to the frequent reports of reactions at the injection site, scientists started to replace whole-cell vaccines with acellular pertussis (aP) vaccines which have, recently, shown a decreased time of immunity and level of protection against colonization. These acellular vaccines are also intramuscular and are composed of purified surface antigens, mainly fimbriae, filamentous hemagglutinin, pertactin and pertussis toxin. Both vaccines are still used today, with the aP vaccine predominantly used in developed countries.

The aP vaccine is also a part of the diphtheria, tetanus, and acellular pertussis (DTaP) immunization. Those being administered these vaccines are recommended to receive boosters as they only afford protection for about 4–12 years; while natural infection offers 7–20 years. Cases in infants are common and often have serious impacts as they are more susceptible to Bordetella pertussis than adolescents and healthy adults. Therefore, to decrease the likelihood of contracting and spreading this disease, parents are recommended to receive the preventative vaccine.

With the resurgence of pertussis cases, there are concerns regarding the level of protection provided by the current vaccine. This vaccine does not offer protection against other species of Bordetella such as B. holmesii and B. bronchiseptica and further highlights the need for a revamped vaccine. Research is currently developing a novel vaccine such as the BPZE1, which is a live attenuated vaccine against B. pertussis and challenges the other pathogens in the 'Classical Bordetellae'. This new vaccine inactivates the gene encoding 3 major toxins with only a single intranasal dose. It is currently being studied for safety in immunocompromised patients and pregnant women. Other promising vaccines are under study and in trial periods for accuracy, efficacy, and safety.

Other types of vaccines being studied for whooping cough prevention, include vaccines that utilize outer membrane vesicles (OMV)..

=== Antibiotic resistance ===
Macrolide resistance in B. pertussis has emerged as a growing concern in several regions, particularly in East Asia. Resistant strains have reduced the effectiveness of commonly used antibiotics such as erythromycin, azithromycin, and clarithromycin. These resistant isolates carry an A2047G point mutation in the 23S rRNA gene, which alters the ribosomal binding site and prevents macrolides from inhibiting protein synthesis. The increasing prevalence of macrolide resistance highlights the importance of continued molecular surveillance and adaptation of treatment strategies.Antibiotic resistance in B. pertussis is considered a growing public health concern due to the reduced susceptibility to macrolide antibiotics. Resistant isolates have become predominant among circulating strains. Although antibiotic treatment can reduce bacterial load and limits transmission when administered early, macrolide resistance diminishes the effectiveness, resulting in more persistent infections and complicating outbreak control. Genomic studies suggest that B. pertussis possesses a dynamic genome capable of rapid adaptation under the selective pressures from antibiotic use and widespread vaccination. These pressures have contributed to the emergence of macrolide-resistance and pertactin-deficient strains, demonstrating the bacterium's evolutionary adaptability.

== See also ==
- Measles virus
- Varicella zoster virus
- Corynebacterium diphtheriae
- Clostridium tetani
