= Cytotoxic necrotising factor family =

CNF1
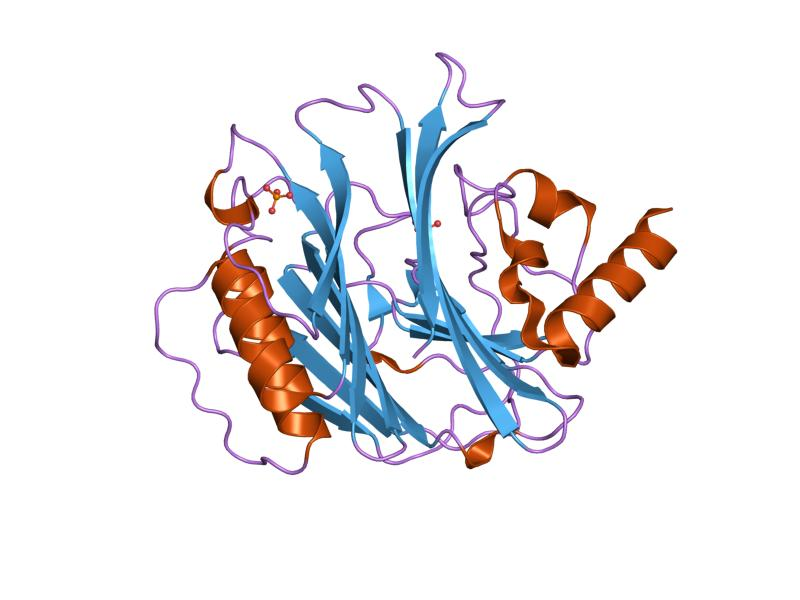
- crystal structure of the inactive c866s mutant of the catalytic domain of e. coli cytotoxic necrotizing factor 1

Identifiers
- Symbol: CNF1
- Pfam: PF05785
- InterPro: IPR008430
- SCOP2: 1hzg / SCOPe / SUPFAM
Available protein structures:
- PDB: IPR008430 PF05785 (ECOD; PDBsum)
- AlphaFold: IPR008430; PF05785

In molecular biology, the cytotoxic necrotising factor family of proteins includes bacterial cytotoxic necrotising factor proteins and the related dermonecrotic toxin (DNT) from Bordetella species. Cytotoxic necrotizing factor 1 (CNF1) is a toxin whose structure from Escherichia coli revealed a 4-layer alpha/beta/beta/alpha structure containing mixed beta-sheets. CNF1 is expressed in strains of E. coli causing uropathogenic and neonatal meningitis. CNF1 alters host cell actin cytoskeleton and promotes bacterial invasion of the blood–brain barrier endothelial cells. CNF1 belongs to a unique group of large cytotoxins that cause constitutive activation of Rho guanosine triphosphatases (GTPases), which are key regulators of the actin cytoskeleton .

Bordetella dermonecrotic toxin (DNT) stimulates the assembly of actin stress fibres and focal adhesions by deamidating or polyaminating Gln63 of the small GTPase Rho. DNT is an A-B toxin composed of an N-terminal receptor-binding (B) domain and a C-terminal enzymatically active (A) domain.
