= Tracheal cytotoxin =

Tat-BP

Names
- IUPAC name (2R,6S)-6-[[(4R)-4-[[(2S)-2-[[(2R)-2-[[(1R,2S,3R,4R,5R)-4-acetamido-2-[(2S,3R,4R,5S,6R)-3-acetamido-4,5-dihydroxy-6-(hydroxymethyl)oxan-2-yl]oxy-6,8-dioxabicyclo[3.2.1]octan-3-yl]oxy]propanoyl]amino]propanoyl]amino]-4-carboxybutanoyl]amino]-2-amino-7-[[(1R)-1-carboxyethyl]amino]-7-oxoheptanoic acid
- Other names: TCT; Tracheal cytotoxin, bordetella pertussis; GlcNAc(beta1-4)-MurNAc(1,6-anhydro)-L-Ala-gamma-D-Glu-meso-A2pm-D-Ala; GlcNAc-1,6-anhMurNAc-L-Ala-gamma-D-Glu-DAP-D-Ala (physiological form; two fewer protons)

Identifiers
CAS Number	94102-64-4; 118013-66-4 deprecated
3D model (JSmol)	Interactive image
ChEBI	CHEBI:46763
ChemSpider	143523
DrugBank	DB04736
PubChem CID	163626
UNII	MJ92ND3XT9
CompTox Dashboard (EPA)	DTXSID90276530
- InChI: InChI=1S/C37H59N7O20/c1-13(30(51)44-20(35(58)59)9-10-23(48)43-19(8-6-7-18(38)34(56)57)32(53)40-14(2)33(54)55)39-31(52)15(3)61-29-25(42-17(5)47)36-60-12-22(63-36)28(29)64-37-24(41-16(4)46)27(50)26(49)21(11-45)62-37/h13-15,18-22,24-29,36-37,45,49-50H,6-12,38H2,1-5H3,(H,39,52)(H,40,53)(H,41,46)(H,42,47)(H,43,48)(H,44,51)(H,54,55)(H,56,57)(H,58,59)/t13-,14+,15+,18+,19-,20+,21+,22+,24+,25+,26+,27+,28+,29+,36+,37-/m0/s1 Key: UPFMKPIBAIPLHT-RSJSDIDPSA-N
- SMILES: C[C@@H](C(=O)N[C@H](CCC(=O)N[C@@H](CCC[C@H](C(=O)O)N)C(=O)N[C@H](C)C(=O)O)C(=O)O)NC(=O)[C@@H](C)O[C@@H]1[C@H]([C@@H]2OC[C@H]([C@H]1O[C@H]3[C@@H]([C@H]([C@@H]([C@H](O3)CO)O)O)NC(=O)C)O2)NC(=O)C

Properties
Chemical formula	C_{37}H_{59}N_{7}O_{20}
Molar mass	921.908 g·mol^{−1}
- Except where otherwise noted, data are given for materials in their standard state (at 25 °C [77 °F], 100 kPa). Infobox references

Tracheal cytotoxin (TCT) is a 921 dalton glycopeptide released by Bordetella pertussis, Vibrio fischeri (as a symbiosis chemical), and Neisseria gonorrhoeae (among other peptidoglycan-derived cytotoxins it produces). It is a soluble piece of peptidoglycan (PGN) found in the cell wall of all gram-negative bacteria, but only some bacteria species release TCT due to inability to recycle this piece of anhydromuropeptide.

== History ==
In 1980, it was discovered that B. pertussis could attach to hamster tracheal epithelial (HTE) cells, and also, that the supernatant from the cultured bacterium could disrupt the cell cycle of uninfected cells. This prompted the scientists W. E. Goldman, D. G. Klapper, and J. B. Baseman to isolate and characterize a novel substance from B. pertussis supernatant. The novel disaccharide tetrapeptide that they had purified showed toxicity for HTE cells and tracheal ring cultures. Subsequently, they named the newly sequestered molecule tracheal cytotoxin (TCT).

== Structure ==
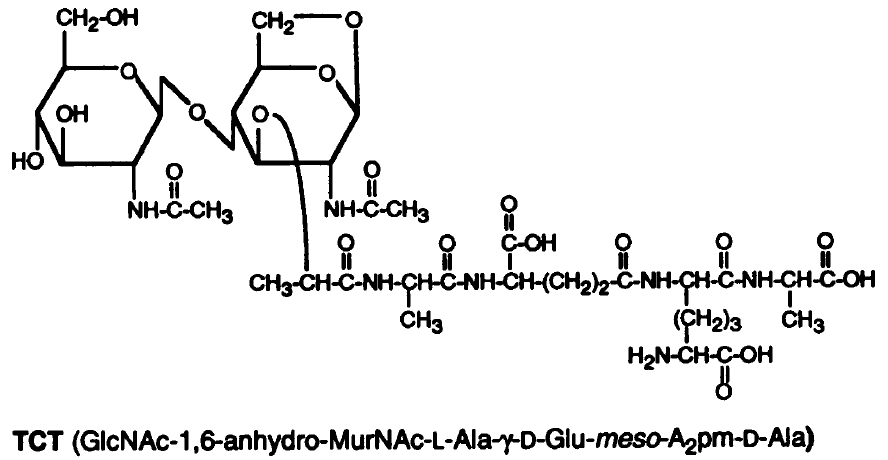
Molecular structure of TCT

TCT is a soluble piece of peptidoglycan (PGN) found in the cell wall of all gram-negative bacteria. Like all PGNs, TCT is composed of a disaccharide and a peptide chain. The IUPAC name for TCT is N-acetylglucosaminyl-1,6-anhydro-N-acetylmuramyl-(L)-alanyl-γ-(D)-glutamyl-mesodiaminopimelyl-(D)-alanine. It is classified as a DAP (diaminopimelic acid)-type PGN due to the third amino group within the chain being a diaminopimelyl peptide.

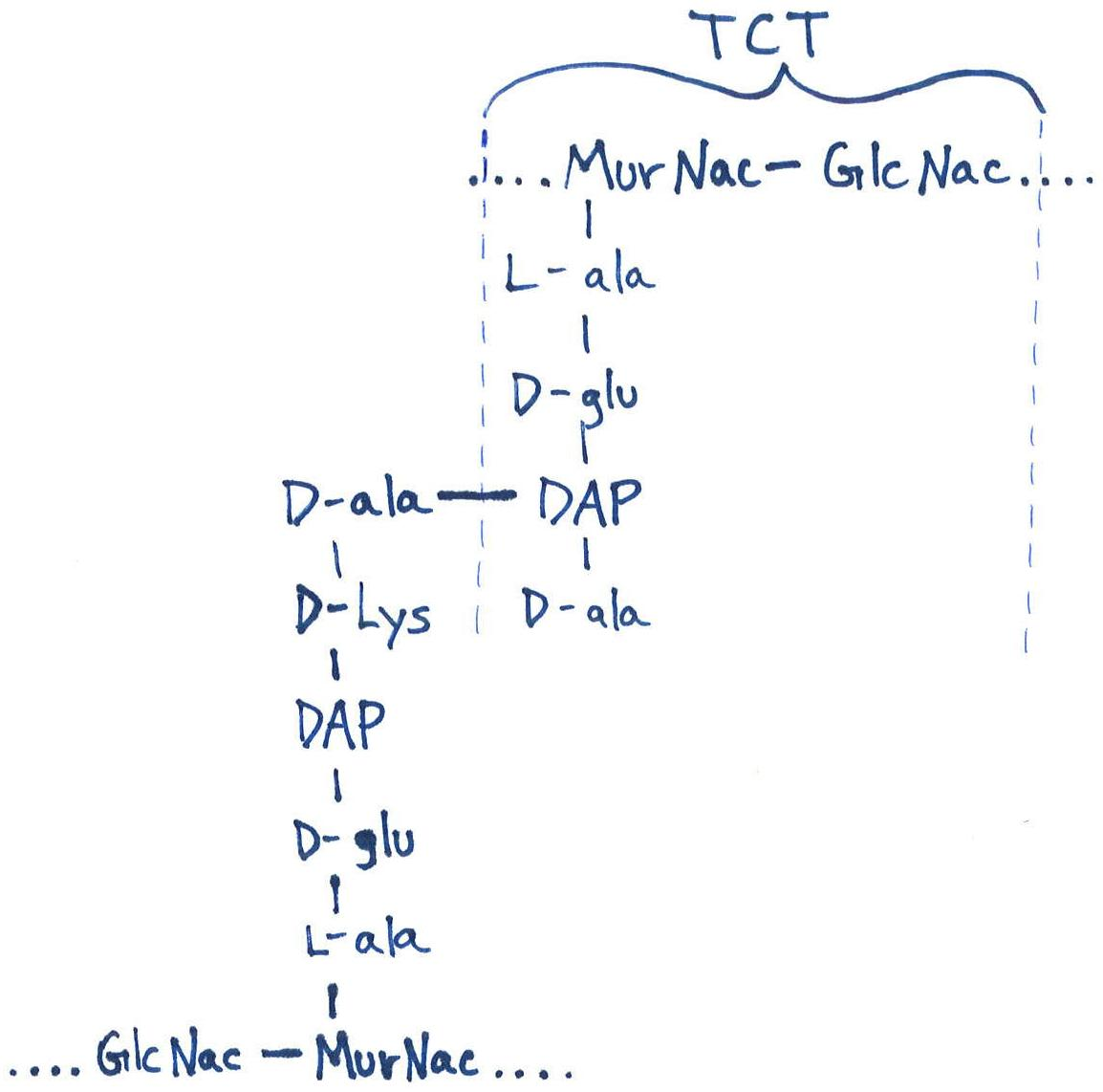
Configuration of TCT within the cell wall of a bacterium

The DAP residue is responsible for directly bonding to the D-alanine peptide of another PGN molecule, thus aiding TCT's attachment within the cell wall.

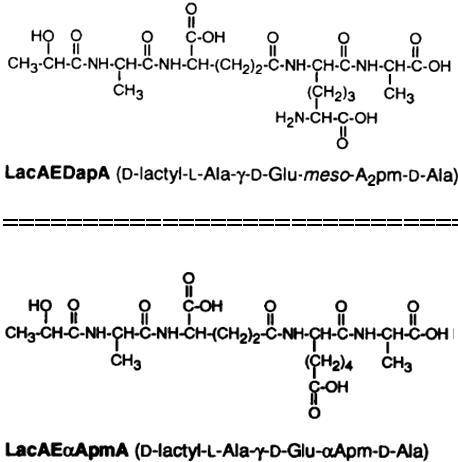
Analogs of TCT. LacAEDapA retains the peptide chain of TCT along with toxicity despite the lack of disaccharide. LacAEαApmA loses the diamino group of TCT along with a significant level of toxicity.

The DAP portion of TCT also implies importance in cytopathogenicity as analogs lacking DAP show a significant reduction in toxicity.

== Mechanism of pathogenesis ==
Most Gram-negative bacteria keep TCT within the cell wall by using a PGN-transporter protein known as AmpG. However, B. pertussis is not capable of recycling PGNs via AmpG and thus, TCT escapes into the surrounding environment. Also, TCT is constitutively released by B. pertussis.

The first murine-model studies using TCT involved treatment of hamster tracheal cells. These experiments alluded to TCT's role in ciliostasis and cellular extrusion of ciliated hamster cells. Also, HTE cells had a markedly reduced level of DNA synthesis post-treatment with TCT.

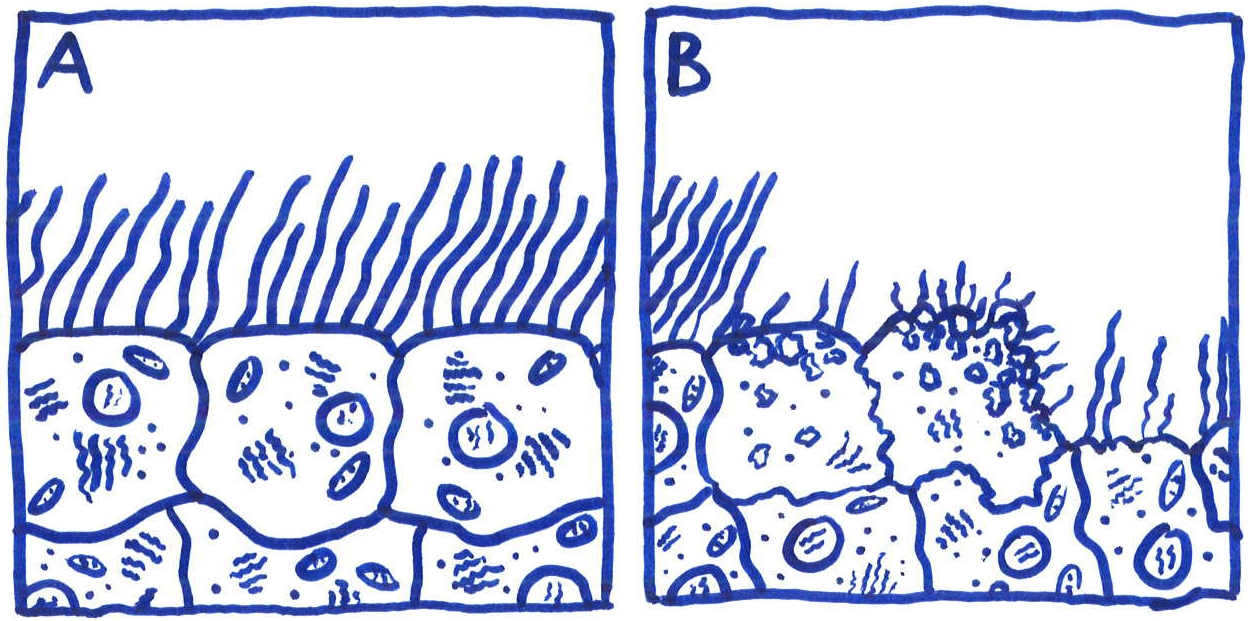
Illustration showing the effects of TCT on human ciliated epithelial cells. Figure A illustrates normal human epithelial tissue. Figure B illustrates normal human epithelial tissue after incubation with TCT. Notice the damaged and extruded ciliated epithelial cells in Figure B.

While previous studies using murine models reported evidence of TCT causing ciliostasis, in vitro studies using human tracheal cells have shown that TCT does not affect ciliary beat frequency of living cells, but instead causes damage and eventual extrusion of ciliated cells. In gonorrhea infections, vaginal ciliated epithelial cells have also displayed the same cytopathogenic effects due to TCT recognition. The extensive damage to ciliated epithelial tissue caused by TCT results in major disruption to the ciliary escalator; an important asset of the host's non-specific defenses. This disruption hinders the host's ability to remove mucous and foreign microbes from the epithelial tissue. Paroxysmal cough, e.g. whooping cough, is a direct symptom of said mucous build-up due to ciliated tissue damage.

NOD-1 recognition and the presence of Lipooligosaccharide (LOS) are two factors that modulate the effect of TCT. NOD-1 is a pattern recognition receptor that detects peptidoglycan. This receptor reacts weakly to TCT in humans, but robustly in mice. TCT is thought to work synergistically with LOS to mediate an inflammatory response, thus causing damage to ciliated epithelial cells. Notably, the human pathogens (B. pertussis and N. gonorrhea) that produce excess TCT, causing damage to cilia also both produce LOS in their outer membrane.

== Effect on immune system ==
TCT has been classified as an adjuvant molecule because of the stimulating effects it has on the immune system. Cellular damage associated with TCT is thought to be a result of increased levels of nitric oxide (NO) secretion by mucosal cells as part of an innate defense response to extracellular lipopolysaccharide (LPS) and TCT. In humans, peptidoglycan recognition proteins, e.g. PGRPIαC, appear to bind with TCT and consequently induce the Tumor Necrosis Factor Receptor (TNFR) pathway. Studies using murine macrophages have shown that TCT encourages cytokine secretion, probably through the NOD1 receptor. As a pleiotropic toxin, TCT also acts as a pyrogen and as a stimulant of slow-wave sleep.

Peptidoglycan recognition protein 4 (PGLYRP4), in mammals (mice), interacts with TCT and reduces damage from pertussis inflammation. This molecule has similar immune-eliciting properties in Drosophila, where a pair of PGRPs perform the recognition.
