= Autotransporter domain =

Autotransporter beta-domain
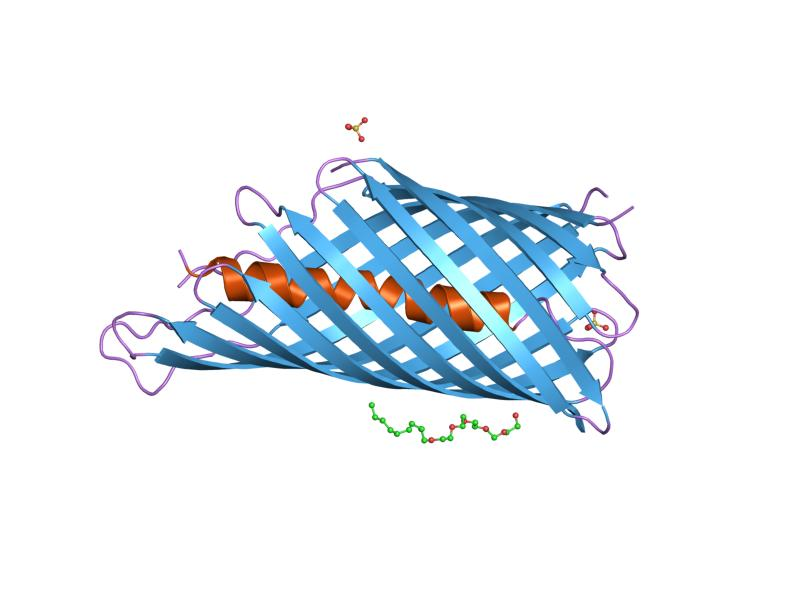
- Structure of the autotransporter domain NalP from Neisseria meningitidis. PDB entry 1uyn

Identifiers
- Symbol: Autotransporter
- Pfam: PF03797
- InterPro: IPR005546
- PROSITE: PDOC51208
- SCOP2: 1uyn / SCOPe / SUPFAM
- TCDB: 1.B.12
- OPM superfamily: 28
- OPM protein: 1uyo
Available protein structures:
- PDB: 1uyoX:810-1074 1uynX:810-1074 IPR005546 PF03797 (ECOD; PDBsum)
- AlphaFold: IPR005546; PF03797

In molecular biology, an autotransporter domain is a structural domain found in some bacterial outer membrane proteins. The domain is always located at the C-terminal end of the protein and forms a beta-barrel structure. The barrel is oriented in the membrane such that the N-terminal portion of the protein, termed the passenger domain, is presented on the cell surface. These proteins are typically virulence factors, associated with infection or virulence in pathogenic bacteria.

The name autotransporter derives from an initial understanding that the protein was self-sufficient in transporting the passenger domain through the outermembrane. This view has since been challenged by Benz and Schmidt.

Secretion of polypeptide chains through the outer membrane of Gram-negative bacteria can occur via a number of different pathways. The type V(a), or autotransporter, secretion pathway constitutes the largest number of secreted virulence factors of any one of the seven known types of secretion in Gram-negative bacteria. This secretion pathway is exemplified by the prototypical IgA1 Protease of Neisseria gonorrhoeae. The protein is directed to the inner membrane by a signal peptide transported across the inner membrane via the Sec machinery. Once in the periplasm, the autotransporter domain inserts into the outer membrane. The passenger domain is passed through the center of the autotransporter domain to be presented on the outside of the cell, however the mechanism by which this occurs remains unclear.

The C-terminal translocator domain corresponds to an outer membrane beta-barrel domain. The N-terminal passenger domain is translocated across the membrane, and may or may not be cleaved from the translocator domain. In those proteins where the cleavage is auto-catalytic, the peptidase domains belong to MEROPS peptidase families S6 and S8. Passenger domains structurally characterized to date have been shown to be dominated by a protein fold known as a beta helix, typified by pertactin. The folding of this domain is thought to be intrinsically linked to its method of outer membrane translocation.

== See also ==
Trimeric Autotransporter Adhesins (TAA)
