= Pertactin =

Virulence factor of Bordetella pertussis

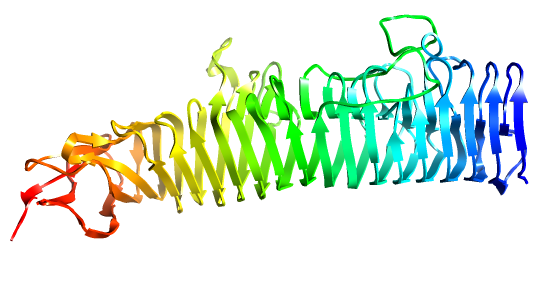
- Bordetella pertussis Virulence Factor P.69 Pertactin. PDB entry 1dab

Identifiers
- Symbol: PRN
- Pfam: PF03212
- InterPro: IPR004899
- PROSITE: PDOC00271
- SCOP2: 1dab / SCOPe / SUPFAM
Available protein structures:
- Pfam: structures / ECOD
- PDB: RCSB PDB; PDBe; PDBj
- PDBsum: structure summary

In molecular biology, pertactin (PRN) is a highly immunogenic virulence factor of Bordetella pertussis, the bacterium that causes pertussis. Specifically, it is an outer membrane protein that promotes adhesion to tracheal epithelial cells. PRN is purified from Bordetella pertussis and is used for the vaccine production as one of the important components of acellular pertussis vaccine.

A large part of the N-terminus of the pertactin protein is composed of beta helix repeats. This region of the pertactin protein is secreted through the C-terminal autotransporter. The N-terminal signal sequences promotes the secretion of PRN into the periplasm through the bacterial secretion system (Sec) and consequently, the translocation into the outer membrane where it is proteolytically cleaved. The loops in the right handed β-helix of the N-terminus that protrudes out of cell surface (region R1) contains sequence repeats Gly-Gly-Xaa-Xaa-Pro and the RGD domain Arg-Gly-Asp. This RGD domain allows PRN to function as an adhesin and invasin, binding to integrins on the outer membrane of the cell. Another loop of the extending β-helix is region 2 (R2) which contains Pro-Gln-Pro (PQP) repeats towards the C-terminus. This protein’s contribution to immunity is still premature. Reports suggest that R1 and R2 are immunogenic regions, however, recent studies regarding genetic variation of those regions prove otherwise.

== In B.bronchiseptica ==
Pertactin adheres to only ciliated epithelial cells of B. bronchiseptica in vivo. However, in vitro, PRN does not adhere to either. PRN does however help provide resistance towards a hyperinflammatory response of innate immunity for B. bronchiseptica. With respect to the adaptive immunity, studies show that PRN plays a role in combating neutrophil-mediated clearance of B. bronchiseptica.
