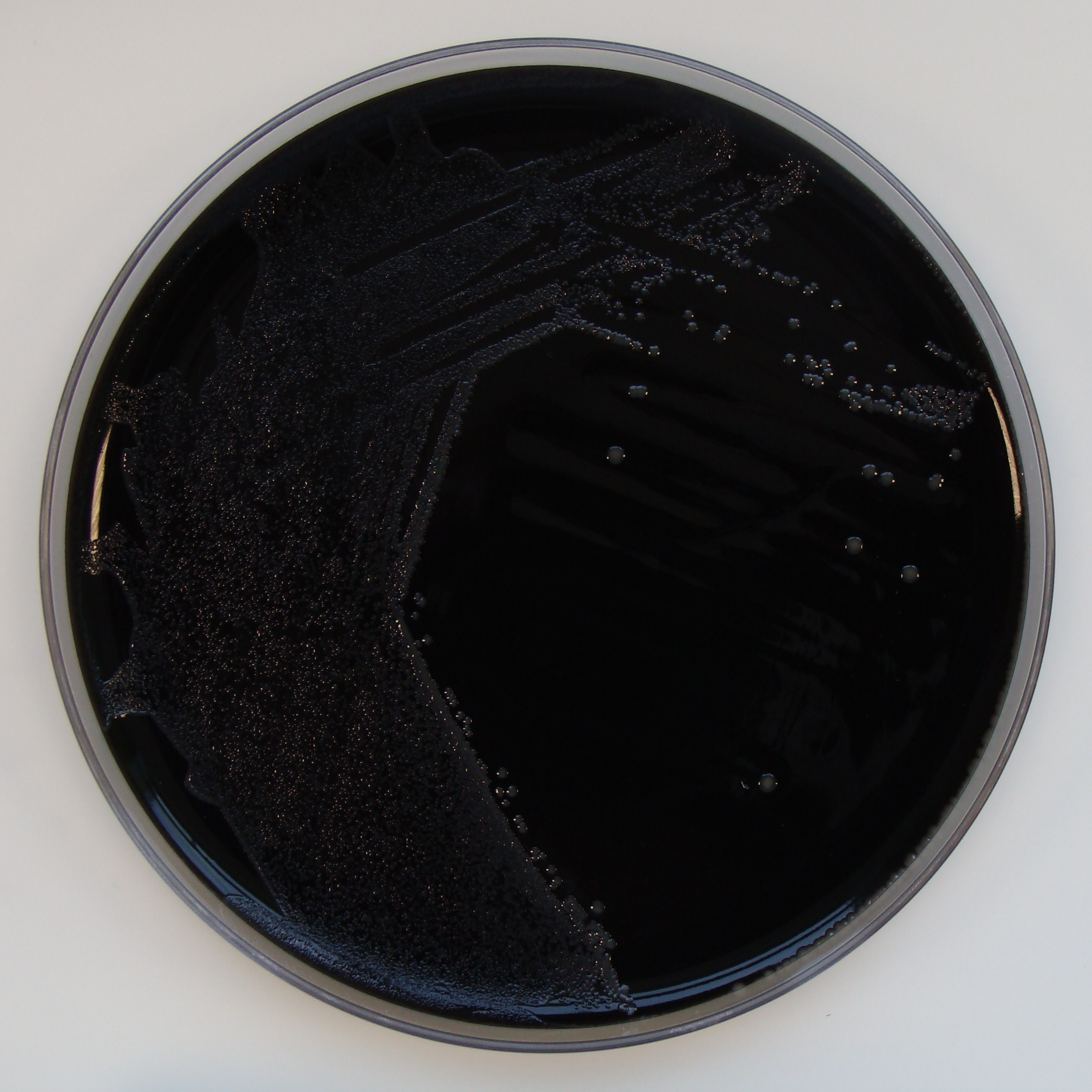
- Bordetella pertussis growing on Charcoal Agar supplemented with Cephalexin. Isolate shown at 7 days growth in 10% carbon dioxide. Isolate from a pernasal swab from a patient with whooping cough

Scientific classification
- Domain: Bacteria
- Kingdom: Pseudomonadati
- Phylum: Pseudomonadota
- Class: Betaproteobacteria
- Order: Burkholderiales
- Family: Alcaligenaceae
- Genus: Bordetella
- Species: B. parapertussis

Binomial name
- Bordetella parapertussis (Eldering and Kendrick 1938) Moreno-López 1952

= Bordetella parapertussis =

Species of bacterium

Bordetella parapertussis is a small Gram-negative bacterium of the genus Bordetella that is adapted to colonise the mammalian respiratory tract. Pertussis caused by B. parapertussis manifests with similar symptoms to B. pertussis-derived disease, but in general tends to be less severe. Immunity derived from B. pertussis does not protect against infection by B. parapertussis, however, because the O-antigen is found only on B. parapertussis. This antigen protects B. parapertussis against antibodies specific to B. pertussis, so the bacteria are free to colonize the host's lungs without being subject to attack by previous antibodies. These findings suggest B. parapertussis evolved in a host population that had already developed immunity to B. pertussis, where being able to evade B. pertussis immunity was an advantage.

Two lineages of B. parapertussis have been described. The first infects humans and is responsible for a minority of cases of the disease pertussis (also known as whooping cough). The second, ovine, lineage causes chronic nonprogressive pneumonia in sheep. Both lineages are thought to have evolved from a B. bronchiseptica-like ancestor. This disease can be symptomatic or asymptomatic and may predispose hosts to secondary infection.
