= Rapid urease test =

Test for Heliobacter pylori infection

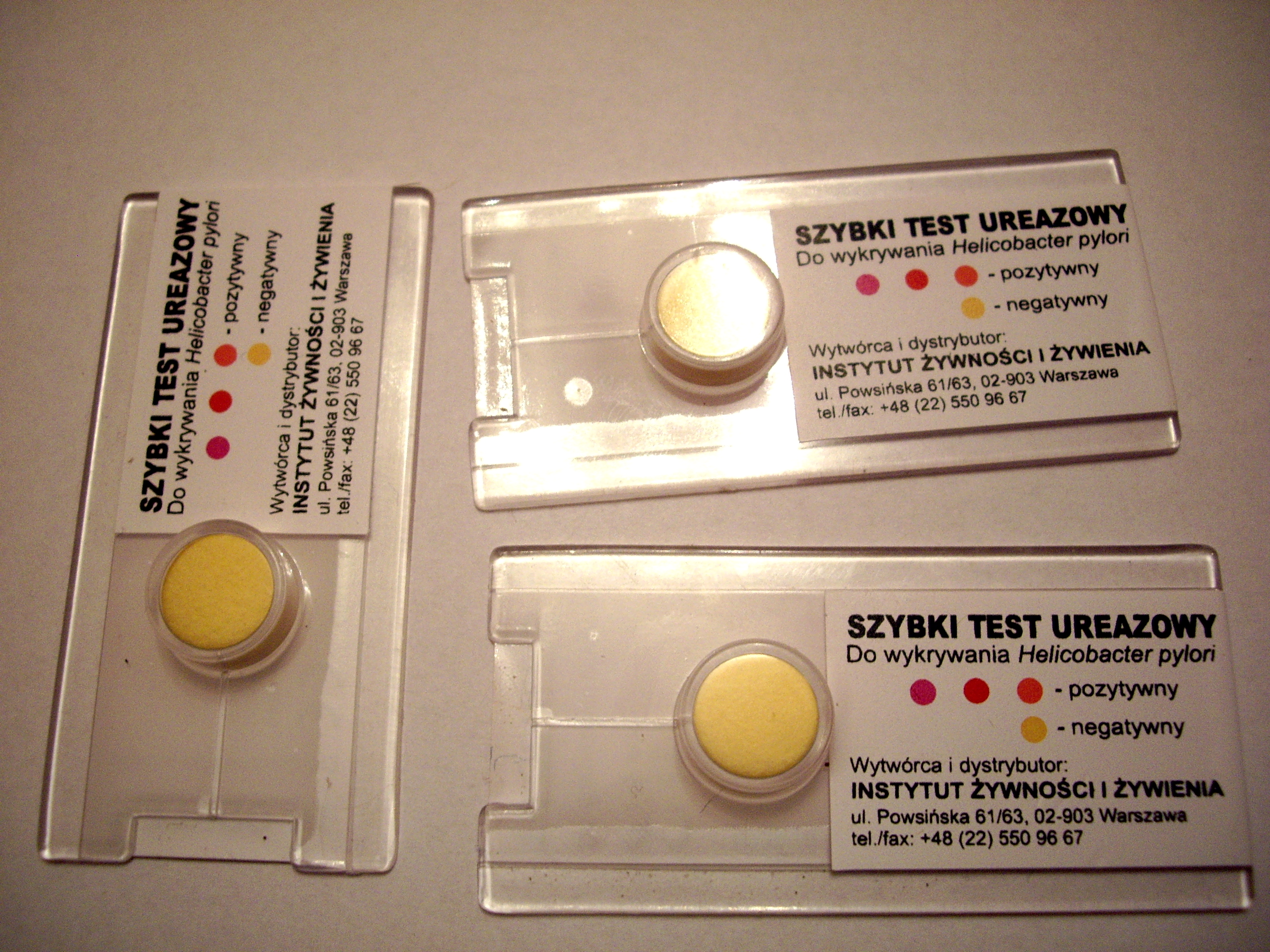
- Rapid urease test
- Purpose: test for diagnosis of Helicobacter pylori.

Rapid urease test, also known as the CLO test (Campylobacter-like organism test), is a rapid diagnostic test for diagnosis of Helicobacter pylori. The basis of the test is the ability of H. pylori to secrete the urease enzyme, which catalyzes the conversion of urea to ammonia and carbon dioxide.

== Process ==
The test is performed at the time of gastroscopy. A biopsy of mucosa is taken from the antrum of the stomach, and is placed into a medium containing urea and an indicator such as phenol red. The urease produced by H. pylori hydrolyzes urea to ammonia, which raises the pH of the medium, and changes the color of the specimen from yellow (NEGATIVE) to red (POSITIVE).

Among different kinds of rapid urease tests (liquid-based, gel-based, dry cool) there is a design type with single-layer sensitive element — a layer impregnated simultaneously with urea and an indicator composition. Such a design bears the risk of false-positive result due to the pH value of the gastric biopsy when it is placed on the sensitive element. Excessive salivation and alkaline bile reflux into the stomach can shift the pH value of the biopsy of the stomach towards alkaline. Drugs that reduce the acidity of the stomach, also contribute to false positive results resulting from the alkalization. In each of these cases, the pH of the biopsy will be shifted to the alkaline side. All of these factors may trigger a non-targeted coloration of the sensitive element in a single-layer rapid urease test. The indicator would change color not in the course of the enzymatic reaction, which then causes alkalization of the medium as a result of ammonia formation, but under the effect of the pH of the gastric biopsy.

== Selective urease test ==
Selective urease tests differ from the single-layer rapid urease tests by their design and higher sensitivity and specificity. In contrast to single-layer rapid urease tests, selective urease tests have several layers, enabling separate enzymatic and indicator reactions. The sample is placed on the first layer impregnated with urea. Ammonia formed during the hydrolysis of urea by urease penetrates through a special selective membrane to the layer impregnated with the indicator composition. Accordingly, the color change occurs directly during the enzymatic reaction. This avoids the influence of the pH value of the sample (gastric biopsy) on the result of a selective urease test, which virtually eliminates the occurrence of false-positive results. If the pH value of the sample is shifted to the acidic side, for example, in the case of increased acidity of gastric juice, this also does not distort the result of the selective urease test.

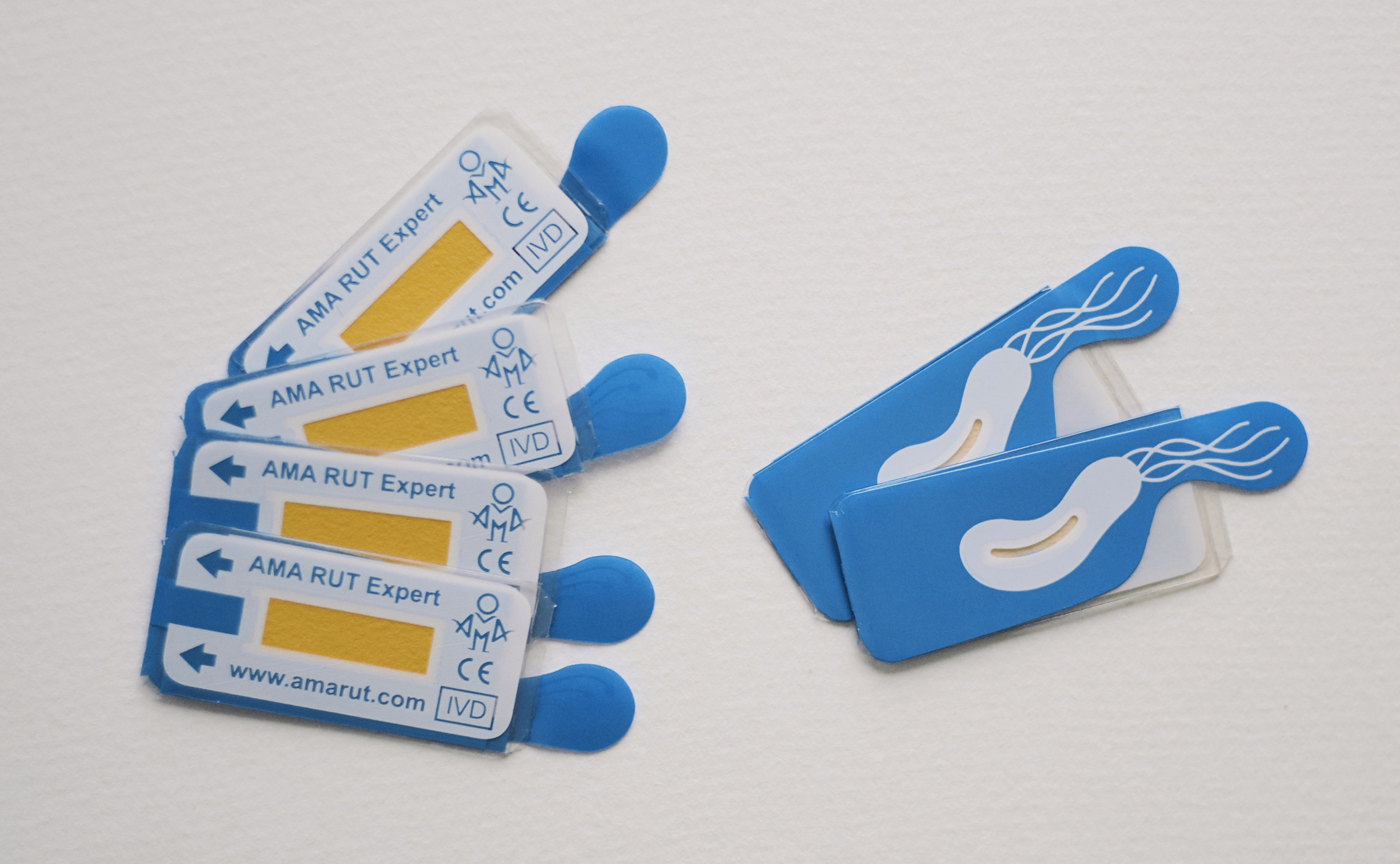
Rapid Urease test that enables testing three biopsy specimens of the same patient simultaneously.

== Limitations ==
There is evidence to suggest that H. pylori moves proximal in the stomach in patients on therapy with proton pump inhibitors, and, as such, samples from the fundus and body should be taken in these patients.

Active gastrointestinal bleeding reduces accuracy of the test.

The specificity and sensitivity of this test is high compared with urea breath test. The test is often done as part of point-of-care diagnostics, to eliminate the time and expense required to detect H. pylori on pathology testing.
