= Bordetella petrii =

Scientific classification
- Domain: Bacteria
- Kingdom: Pseudomonadati
- Phylum: Pseudomonadota
- Class: Betaproteobacteria
- Order: Burkholderiales
- Family: Alcaligenaceae
- Genus: Bordetella
- Species: B. petrii

Binomial name
- Bordetella petrii Von Wintzingerode et al. 2001

Type strain
- ATCC BAA-461, CCM 7166, CCUG 43448, CIP 107267, DSM 12804, LMG 26168, Se-1111R, strain Se-1111R, Vandamme R-24010

Species of bacterium

Bordetella petrii is a bacterium of the genus Bordetella isolated from different habitats, including humans. B. petrii has the ability to grow under aerobic conditions and adapt to different environmental conditions. The complete genome of B. petrii has been sequenced.
