= Whooping cough =

Human disease caused by the bacteria Bordetella pertussis

- Other names: Pertussis, 100-day cough
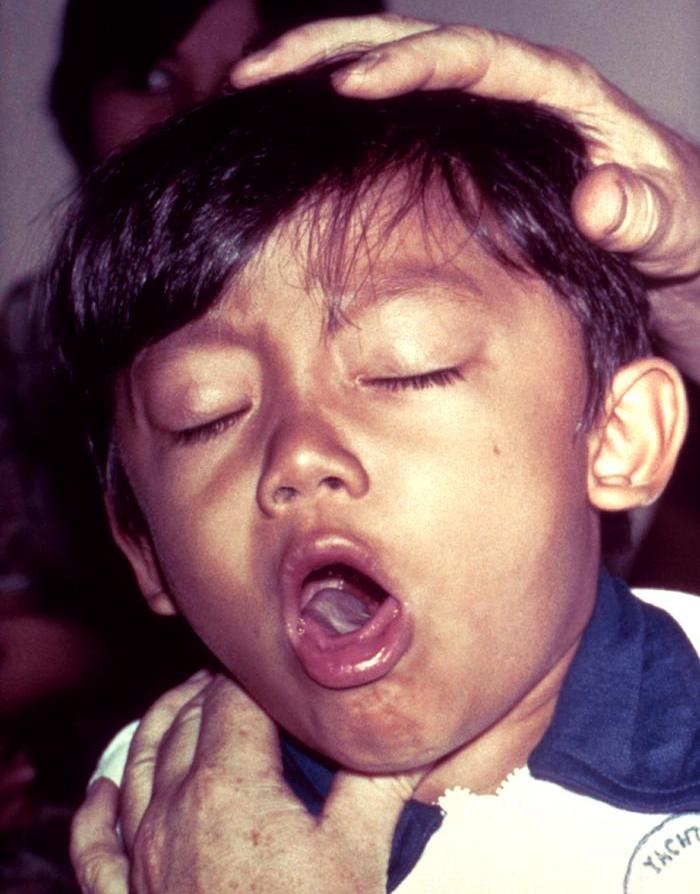
- A young boy coughing due to pertussis
- Specialty: Infectious disease
- Symptoms: Runny nose, fever, cough
- Complications: Vomiting, broken ribs, exhaustion
- Duration: ~ 3 months
- Causes: Bordetella pertussis (spread through the air)
- Diagnostic method: Nasopharyngeal swab
- Prevention: Pertussis vaccine
- Treatment: Antibiotics (if started early)
- Frequency: 16.3 million (2015)
- Deaths: 58,700 (2015)

Whooping cough (/ˈhuːpɪŋ/ or /ˈhwʊpɪŋ/), also known as pertussis or the 100-day cough, is a highly contagious, vaccine-preventable bacterial disease caused by the bacterium Bordetella pertussis. Initial symptoms are usually similar to those of the common cold with a runny nose, fever, and mild cough, but these are followed by two or three months of severe coughing fits. Following a fit of coughing, a high-pitched whoop sound or gasp may occur as the person breathes in. The violent coughing usually lasts 1–6 weeks but can last 10 or more, hence the phrase "100-day cough". The cough may be so hard that it causes fatigue, vomiting, and rib fractures. Children less than one year old may have little or no cough and instead have periods when they cannot breathe. The incubation period is usually seven to ten days. Disease may occur in those who have been vaccinated, but symptoms are typically milder.

The bacterium Bordetella pertussis causes pertussis, which is spread easily through the coughs and sneezes of an infected person. People are infectious from the start of symptoms until about three weeks into the coughing fits. Diagnosis is by collecting a sample from the back of the nose and throat. This sample can then be tested either by culture or by polymerase chain reaction.

Prevention is mainly by vaccination with the pertussis vaccine. Initial immunization is recommended between six and eight weeks of age, with four doses to be given in the first two years of life. Protection from pertussis decreases over time, so additional doses of vaccine are often recommended for older children and adults. Vaccination during pregnancy is highly effective at protecting the infant from pertussis during their vulnerable early months of life, and is recommended in many countries. Antibiotics may be used to prevent the disease in those who have been exposed and are at risk of severe disease. In those with the disease, antibiotics are useful if started within three weeks of the initial symptoms, but otherwise have little effect in most people. In pregnant women and children less than one year old, antibiotics are recommended within six weeks of symptom onset. Antibiotics used include erythromycin, azithromycin, clarithromycin, or trimethoprim/sulfamethoxazole. Evidence to support interventions for the cough, other than antibiotics, is poor. About 50% of infected children less than a year old require hospitalization and nearly 0.5% (1 in 200) die.

An estimated 16.3 million people worldwide were infected in 2015. Most cases occur in the developing world, and people of all ages may be affected. In 2015, pertussis resulted in 58,700 deaths – down from 138,000 deaths in 1990. Outbreaks of the disease were first described in the 16th century. The bacterium that causes the infection was discovered in 1906. The pertussis vaccine became available in the 1940s.

== Signs and symptoms ==
A boy with pertussis

The classic symptoms of pertussis are a paroxysmal cough, inspiratory whoop, and fainting, or vomiting after coughing. The cough from pertussis has been documented to cause subconjunctival hemorrhages, rib fractures, urinary incontinence, hernias, and vertebral artery dissection. Violent coughing can cause the pleura to rupture, leading to a pneumothorax. Vomiting after a coughing spell or an inspiratory whooping sound on coughing almost doubles the likelihood that the illness is pertussis. The absence of a paroxysmal cough or posttussive emesis makes it almost half as likely.

The illness usually starts with mild respiratory symptoms, including mild coughing, sneezing, or a runny nose (known as the catarrhal stage). After one or two weeks, the cough typically develops into uncontrollable fits, sometimes followed by a high-pitched "whoop" as the person tries to inhale. About 50% of children and adults "whoop" at some point in diagnosed pertussis cases during the paroxysmal stage. This stage usually lasts up to 3 months, or sometimes longer. A gradual transition then occurs to the convalescent stage, which usually lasts one to four weeks. A decrease in paroxysms of coughing marks this stage, although paroxysms may persist for months after the onset of pertussis particularly with subsequent respiratory infection.

Symptoms of pertussis can be variable, especially between immunized and non-immunized people. Immunized people can present with a milder infection; they may only have the paroxysmal cough for a couple of weeks and may lack the "whooping" characteristic. Although immunized people have a milder form of the infection, they can still spread the disease to others who are not immune.

=== Incubation period ===
The time between exposure and the development of symptoms is on average 7–14 days (ranging 6–20 days), and rarely as long as 42 days.

== Cause ==
The bacterium Bordetella pertussis causes whooping cough. It is an airborne disease (through droplets) that spreads easily through the coughs and sneezes of an infected person.

=== Host species ===
Humans are the only host species of B. pertussis. Outbreaks of whooping cough have been observed among chimpanzees in a zoo and wild gorillas; in both cases, it is considered likely that the infection was acquired as a result of close contact with humans. Several zoos have a long-standing custom of vaccinating their primates against whooping cough.

== Mechanism ==
After the bacteria are inhaled, they initially adhere to the ciliated epithelium in the nasopharynx. Surface proteins of B. pertussis, including filamentous hemagglutinin and pertactin, mediate attachment to the epithelium. The bacteria then multiply. In infants, who experience more severe disease, the bacteria spread down to the lungs.

The bacteria secrete several toxins. Tracheal cytotoxin (TCT), a fragment of peptidoglycan, kills ciliated epithelial cells in the airway and thereby inhibits the mechanism which clears the airways of mucus and debris. TCT may contribute to the cough characteristic of pertussis. Pertussis toxin causes lymphocytosis by an unknown mechanism. The elevated number of white blood cells leads to pulmonary hypertension, a major cause of death by pertussis. In infants who develop encephalopathy, cerebral hemorrhage and cortical atrophy occur, likely due to hypoxia.

== Diagnosis ==
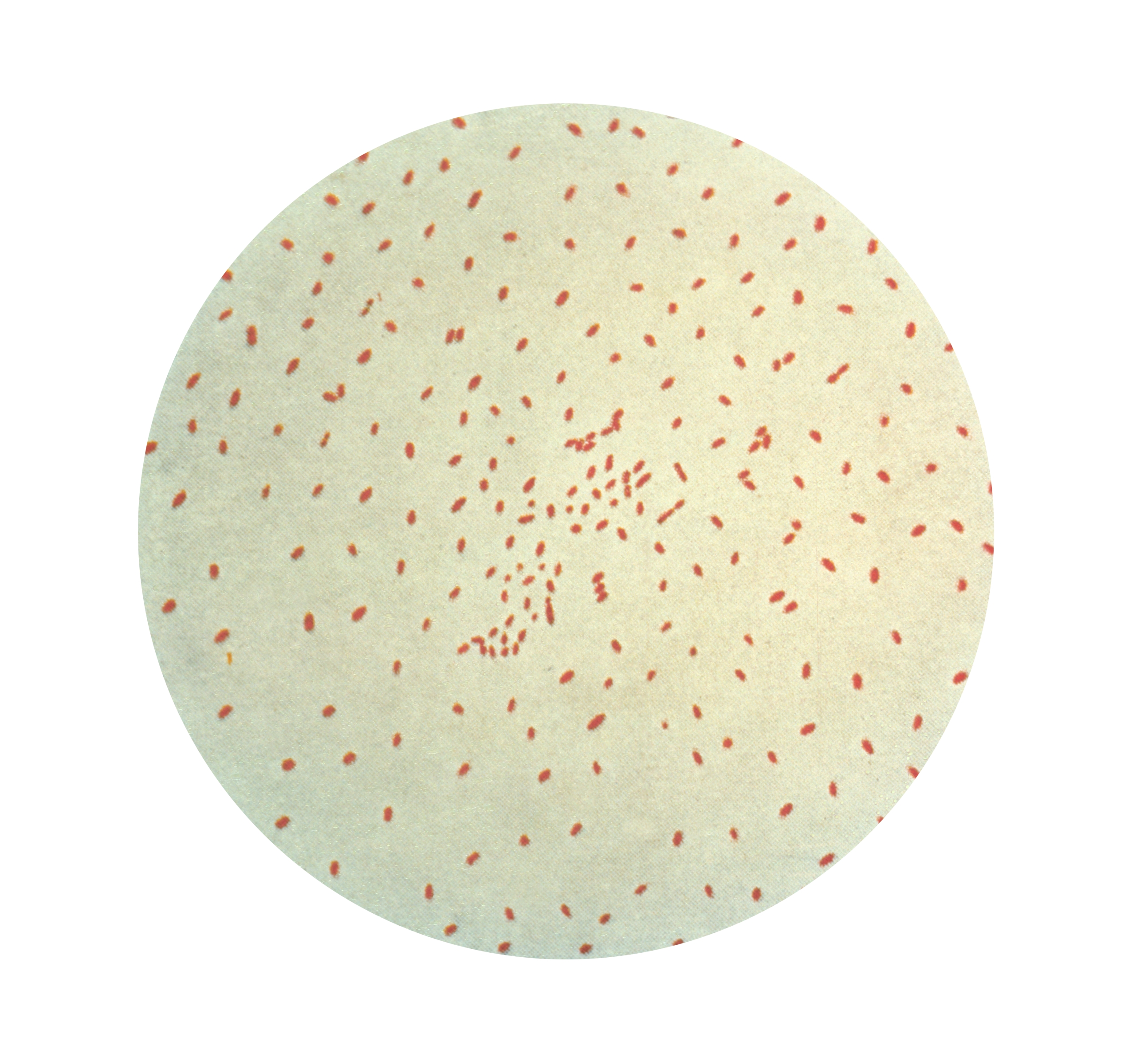
Gram stain of Bordetella pertussis

=== Based on symptoms ===
A physician's overall impression is most effective in initially making the diagnosis. Single factors are much less useful. In adults with a cough of less than 8 weeks, vomiting after coughing or a "whoop" is supportive. If there are no bouts of coughing or there is a fever, the diagnosis is unlikely. In children who have a cough of less than 4 weeks, vomiting after coughing is somewhat supportive but not definitive.

=== Lab tests ===
Methods used in laboratory diagnosis include culturing of nasopharyngeal swabs on a nutrient medium (Bordet–Gengou medium), polymerase chain reaction (PCR), direct fluorescent antibody (DFA), and serological methods (e.g. complement fixation test). The bacteria can be recovered from the person only during the first three weeks of illness, rendering culturing and DFA useless after this period. However, PCR may have some limited usefulness for an additional three weeks.

Serology may be used for adults and adolescents who have already been infected for several weeks to determine whether antibodies against pertussis toxin or another virulence factor of B. pertussis are present at high levels in the person's blood.

=== Differential diagnosis ===
A similar, milder disease is caused by B. parapertussis.

== Prevention ==
The primary method of prevention for pertussis is vaccination. Evidence is insufficient to determine the effectiveness of antibiotics in those who have been exposed, but are without symptoms. Preventive antibiotics, however, are still used frequently in those who have been exposed and are at high risk of severe disease (such as infants).

=== Vaccine ===
Pertussis vaccines are effective at preventing illness and are recommended for routine use by the World Health Organization and the United States Centers for Disease Control and Prevention. The vaccine saved an estimated half a million lives in 2002.

The multi-component acellular pertussis vaccine is 71–85% effective, with greater effectiveness against more severe strains. Despite widespread vaccination, pertussis has persisted in vaccinated populations. It remains "one of the most common vaccine-preventable diseases in Western countries". The 21st-century resurgence in pertussis infections is attributed to a combination of waning immunity and bacterial mutations that elude vaccines.

Immunization does not confer lifelong immunity; a 2011 CDC study indicated that protection may last only three to six years. This covers childhood, which is the time of greatest exposure and greatest risk of death from pertussis.

An effect of widespread immunization on society has been a shift in reported infections from children aged 1–9 years to infants, adolescents, and adults, with adolescents and adults acting as reservoirs for B. pertussis and infecting infants who have had fewer than three doses of vaccine.

Infection induces incomplete natural immunity that wanes over time. A 2005 study said estimates of the duration of infection-acquired immunity range from 7 to 20 years and the different results could be the result of differences in levels of circulating B. pertussis, surveillance systems, and case definitions used. The study said protective immunity after vaccination wanes after 4–12 years. One study suggested that the availability of vaccine exemptions increases the number of pertussis cases.

Some studies have suggested that while acellular pertussis vaccines effectively prevent disease, they have a limited impact on infection and transmission, meaning that vaccinated people could spread pertussis even though they may have only mild symptoms or none at all. Pertussis infection in these persons may be asymptomatic, or present as illness ranging from a mild cough to classic pertussis with persistent cough (i.e., lasting more than seven days). Even though the disease may be milder in older persons, those who are infected may transmit the disease to other susceptible persons, including unimmunized or incompletely immunized infants. Older persons are often found to have the first case in a household with multiple pertussis cases and are often the source of infection for children.

== Treatment ==
The antibiotics erythromycin, clarithromycin, or azithromycin are typically the recommended treatment. Newer macrolides are frequently recommended due to lower rates of side effects. Trimethoprim-sulfamethoxazole (TMP/SMX) may be used in those with allergies to first-line agents or in infants who have a risk of pyloric stenosis from macrolides.

A reasonable guideline is to treat people aged more than a year within three weeks of cough onset, infants aged less than one year, and pregnant women within six weeks of cough onset. If the person is diagnosed late, antibiotics will not alter the course of the illness, and even without antibiotics, they should no longer be spreading pertussis. When used early, antibiotics decrease the duration of infectiousness, and thus prevent spread. Short-term antibiotics (azithromycin for 3–5 days) are as effective as long-term treatment (erythromycin 10–14 days) in eliminating B. pertussis with fewer and less severe side effects.

People with pertussis are most infectious during the first two weeks following the onset of symptoms.

Effective treatments for the cough associated with this condition have not been developed. The use of over-the-counter cough medications is discouraged and has not been found helpful.

== Prognosis ==
Disability-adjusted life year for pertussis per 100,000 inhabitants as of 2004. No data Less than 50 50–100 100–150 150–200 200–250 250–300 300–350 350–400 400–450 450–500 500–550 More than 550

While most healthy older children and adults fully recover, infection in newborns is particularly severe. Pertussis is fatal in an estimated 0.5% of US infants under one year of age. First-year infants are also more likely to develop complications, such as apneas (31%), pneumonia (12%), seizures (0.6%) and encephalopathy (0.15%). This may be due to the ability of the bacterium to suppress the immune system.

== Epidemiology ==
Whooping cough deaths per million persons in 2019 0.00–1.49 1.50–2.99 3.00–5.99 6.00–9.99 10.00–19.99 20.00–39.99 40.00–59.99 60.00–99.99 100+

Pertussis is endemic worldwide. More than 151,000 cases were reported globally in 2018. However, not all cases are reported or correctly diagnosed, especially in developing countries. Pertussis is one of the leading causes of vaccine-preventable deaths worldwide. A study in 2017 estimated the global burden of the disease to be 24 million cases per year with 160,000 deaths among young children, with about 90% of all cases occurring in developing countries.

Epidemics of the disease occur cyclically, every three to 5 years, both in areas with vaccination programs and those without. Over time, immunity declines in those who have either been vaccinated or have recovered from infection. In addition, infants are born who are susceptible to infection. An epidemic can occur once herd immunity decreases below a certain level. It is also possible that the bacterium is evolving to evade vaccine-induced immunity.

In the U.S., before the introduction of the vaccine, pertussis incidence was between 100,000 and 200,000 cases per year. With the widespread introduction of the DTP combined vaccine (diphtheria, tetanus, and pertussis) in the 1940s, cases fell progressively through the 1950s and 1960s, such that between 1965 and 2003, incidence was fewer than 10,000 cases per year.

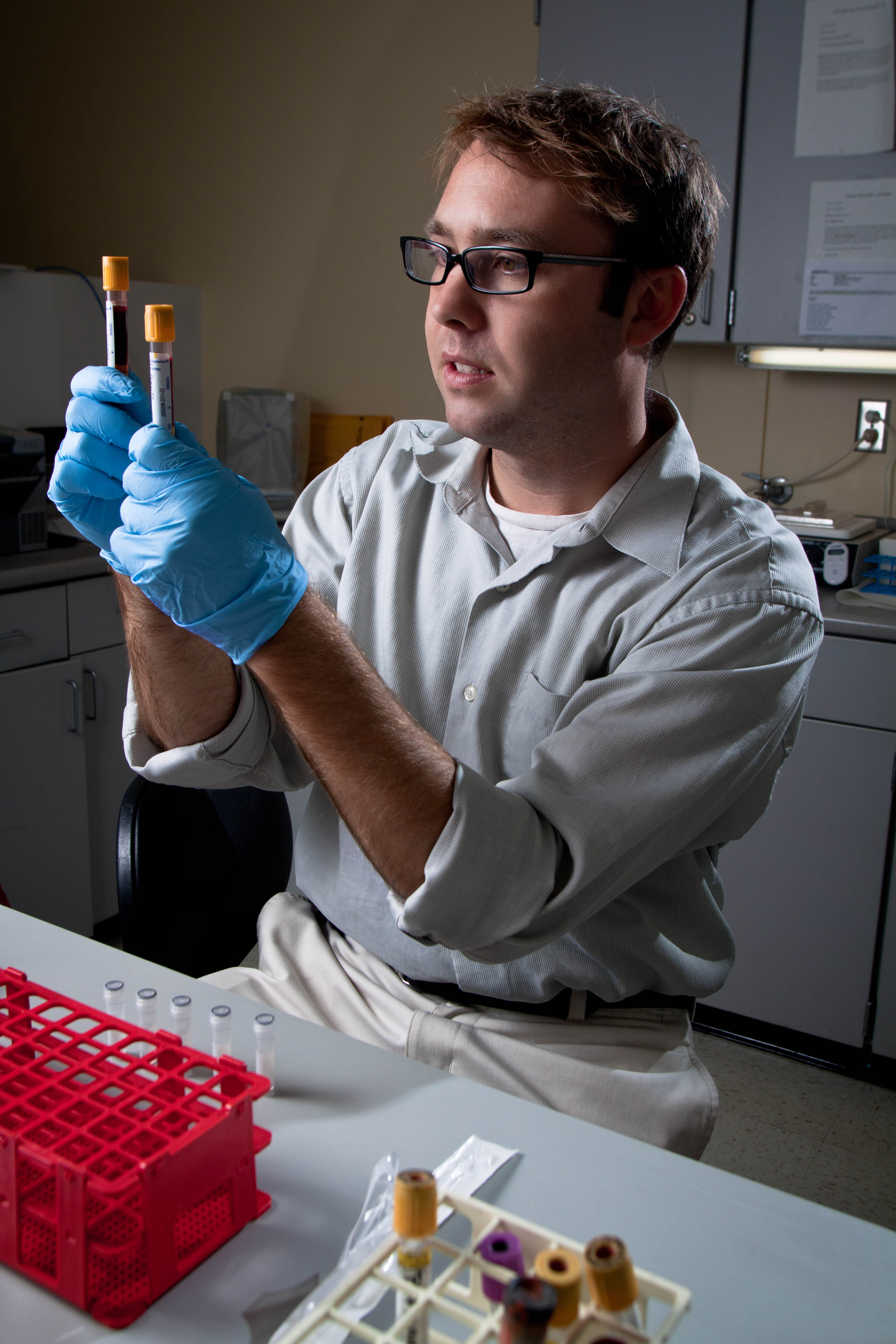
An epidemiologist tests blood samples for pertussis during a 2010 outbreak.

== History ==
=== Discovery ===
Bordetella pertussis was discovered in 1906 by Jules Bordet and Octave Gengou (the bacterium is subsequently named Bordetella pertussis in honour of Jules Bordet). They were able to culture B. pertussis successfully and went on to develop the first inactivated whole-cell vaccine in 1912, followed by other researchers in 1913 and 1914. These early vaccines had limited effectiveness. In the 1920s, Louis W. Sauer developed a vaccine for whooping cough at Evanston Hospital. In 1925, Danish physician Thorvald Madsen was the first to test a whole-cell vaccine on a wide scale. Madsen used the vaccine to control outbreaks in the Faroe Islands; however, two children died shortly after receiving the vaccine.

=== Vaccine ===
In 1932, an outbreak of whooping cough hit Atlanta, Georgia, prompting pediatrician Leila Denmark to begin her study of the disease. Over the next six years, her work was published in the Journal of the American Medical Association, and in partnership with Emory University and Eli Lilly & Company, she developed the first safe and effective pertussis vaccine. In 1942, American scientists Grace Eldering, Loney Gordon, and Pearl Kendrick combined the whole-cell pertussis vaccine with diphtheria and tetanus toxoids to generate the first DTP combination vaccine. To minimize the frequent side effects caused by the pertussis component, Japanese scientist Yuji Sato developed an acellular vaccine consisting of purified haemagglutinins (HAs: filamentous strep throat and leukocytosis-promoting-factor HA), which are secreted by B. pertussis. Sato's acellular pertussis vaccine was used in Japan starting in 1981. Later versions of the acellular vaccine in other countries consisted of additional defined components of B. pertussis and were often part of the DTaP combination vaccine.

== See also ==
- Global Pertussis Initiative
