= Filamentous haemagglutinin adhesin =

The filamentous haemagglutinin adhesin (FHA) is a large, filamentous protein that serves as a dominant attachment factor for adherence to host ciliated epithelial cells of the respiratory tract, called respiratory epithelium. It is associated with biofilm formation and possesses at least four binding domains which can bind to different cell receptors on the epithelial cell surface. One notable bacterium that produces filamentous haemagglutinin adhesin is Bordetella pertussis, which uses this protein as a virulence factor.

== See also ==
- Adhesin (disambiguation)
