= Margaret Pittman =

American bacteriologist

Dr. Margaret Pittman
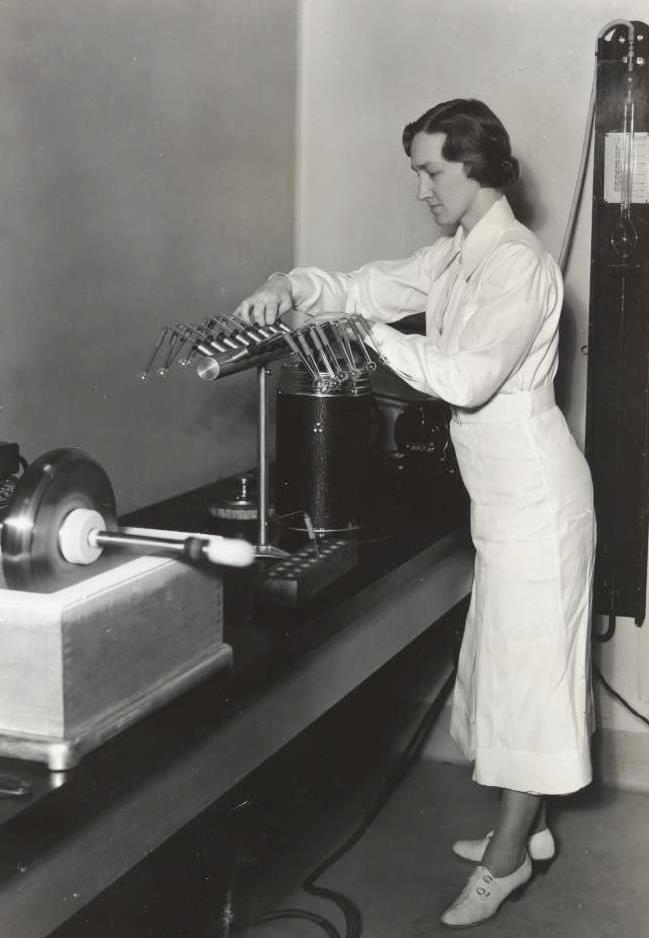
- Dr. Margaret Pittman, U.S. National Institute of Health, demonstrates the Flosdorf-Mudd lyophile process which dries cultures of meningitis germs.
- Born: January 20, 1901; Prairie Grove, Arkansas
- Died: August 19, 1995 (aged 94); Cheverly, Maryland
- Education: Hendrix College, BA in biology and mathematics, magna cum laude; University of Chicago, MA and Ph.D. in bacteriology
- Known for: Vaccine Research Changes in standards for blood transfusion First woman to head an NIH laboratory
- Scientific career
- Fields: Bacteriology; Vaccine Development
- Workplaces: National Institutes of Health
- Thesis: Does Hemophilus influenza cause influenza? (1928)

Margaret Jane Pittman (1901–1995) was an American pioneering bacteriologist whose research at the National Institutes of Health (NIH) on typhoid, cholera, and pertussis (whooping cough) helped the development of vaccinations against these and other diseases. Pittman also became the first woman to lead a NIH laboratory when in 1957, she was appointed chief of their Laboratory of Bacterial Products, a position she held until 1971. In the 1960s she was a key NIH participant in developing standards for cholera vaccine in the Southeast Asia Treaty Organization's campaign to control cholera in the region that is now Bangladesh. After her retirement in 1971, she continued to work for the World Health Organization as a consultant on vaccine standards, working in Cairo and Madrid and for the State Institute for Serum and Vaccine in Iran and Connaught Laboratories, Ltd., in Toronto.

== Life ==
Margaret Pittman was born on January 20, 1901, in Prairie Grove, Arkansas. A descendant of Cyrus Hall McCormick, inventor of the mechanical reaper, she was the daughter of a physician, Dr. James Pittman, and Virginia Alice McCormick Pittman. Young Margaret, with her sister Helen and brother James, would often accompany her father in his practice. In 1919, her father died of unsuccessful surgery for appendicitis, leaving instructions that all his children attend Hendrix College in Conway, Arkansas. Her mother supplemented their income as a dressmaker and vendor of canned fruits and vegetables in order to support her children's education at Hendrix College. In 1923, Margaret graduated magna cum laude at Hendrix with a BA in biology and mathematics. She briefly held a teaching position at the Girl's Academy of Galloway College in Searcy, Arkansas, becoming principal of the Academy in her second year. Having saved sufficient money from her teaching to enroll in the University of Chicago, she received a master's degree in bacteriology in 1926 and earned a Ph.D. three years later, under the mentorship of Dr. Isidore S. Falk. She was supported by a University of Chicago fellowship and a research fellowship from the Influenza Commission of the Metropolitan Life Insurance Company.

Pittman completed her Ph.D. dissertation work on the pathogenesis of pneumococcus pneumonia after taking a job in 1928 at the Rockefeller Institute in New York to work with Dr. Rufus Cole on the question, “Does Hemophilus influenza cause influenza?,” one of the perplexing medical problems of that time. Her work on this question led to her discovery that a second (later found to be multiple) strains of the organism existed, some that were encapsulated. This research permitted the development of an antiserum and later a vaccine known as Hib against the meningitis caused by one strain (known as the b strain) of H. influenzae, which often resulted in blindness and sometimes death in younger children. This research also earned Pittman an international scientific reputation before she was thirty years old.

In 1934, with the Great Depression gripping the country, Pittman's appointment at the Rockefeller Institute was ended, and, accepting a pay cut, she took a position at the New York State Department of Health Laboratories, where she worked on biologics (vaccines and antisera injected into the human body). In 1935, the U.S. Congress passed and President Franklin D. Roosevelt signed the Social Security Act, which included funds to expand health research in the federal government. The following year, Pittman joined the National Institute of Health (now National Institutes of Health) and worked with Dr. Sara E. Branham, who had been one of her teachers at the University of Chicago, on developing standards for an meningococcus antiserum. As a part of this work, Pittman and Branham introduced the first statistical method, the Reed-Münch test, into biologics testing.

During World War II, Pittman's work focused on fevers after the administration of blood and blood products. Her investigations of the process and media used in sterility tests led to changes that protected transfusion recipients. One key change was that a small vial of donated blood be kept separate from the main container of donated blood for sterility testing so that new contaminants could not be introduced on syringes used to withdraw blood for testing.

In 1943, soon after the Division of Biologics Control had moved to the new Bethesda, Maryland, campus of the NIH, Pittman began work on a standard of potency for a pertussis (whooping cough) vaccine. In collaboration with Dr. Pearl Kendrick and Dr. Grace Eldering of the Michigan Department of Health, who had pioneered an effective pertussis vaccine but who had been unable to develop a potency assay, Pittman guided the 1949 initiation of U.S. standards for pertussis vaccine, which also became the basis of the international potency requirement of the World Health Organization. This led to a tenfold drop in mortality from whooping cough in the United States between 1945 and 1954. The safety of the vaccine, however, continued to be a vexing issue, especially the risk of neurological reactions similar to those caused by the disease itself. Throughout the rest of her career, Pittman continued to work on research that would improve the safety of the vaccine.

During 1955, Dr. Pittman agreed to serve as president of the Washington Academy of Sciences, which was a one-year term. In 1958, her years of tireless research were rewarded when she was named Chief of the Laboratory of Bacterial Products, a post she held until her retirement in 1971. The first woman to head an NIH laboratory, Pittman never complained about sex discrimination, but for historians looking back, it is hard not to wonder whether a man who arrived at any institution with an international reputation for research achievements equivalent to hers would have been made to wait twenty years for such advancement.

During the 1960s, Pittman worked with the Cholera Research Laboratory in Dacca, East Pakistan (now Bangladesh) on a Southeast Asia Treaty Organization (SEATO) project headed by Dr. Joseph E. Smadel, an associate director at NIH. After Smadel's sudden death in 1963, Pittman served as project director for five years. With her colleagues, she demonstrated that the potency assay of the cholera vaccine was directly related to the effectiveness of the vaccine. Pittman also served as a consultant to the World Health Organization in formulating the WHO requirement for cholera vaccine. She participated in WHO comparative laboratory assays of typhoid vaccines and contributed to the development of revised U.S. standards. Finally, with NIH colleagues, Pittman worked out standards for a single injection of tetanus toxoid in pregnant women to protect newborns who, in rural areas of New Guinea, were often delivered unaided and left for a period of time on the bare ground.

In 1971, Pittman officially retired at the age of 70, but continued to work at the NIH as an "unpaid consultant." During her prolific career, Dr. Pittman was the recipient of numerous awards, including an honorary LL.D. from Hendrix College and the Federal Woman's Award in 1970. To recognize her mother's hard work in helping her and her siblings pay for their college education at Hendrix, Pittman in 1981 created the Virginia A. McCormick Pittman Distinguished Professorship. She received the EMD Millipore Alice C. Evans Award from the American Society for Microbiology in 1990. In 1994, she was honored with an NIH Lectureship in her name. A collection of her papers is held at the NIH's National Library of Medicine in Bethesda, Maryland and an oral history is available from the Office of NIH History. Dr. Pittman died on August 19, 1995, in Cheverly, Maryland and is buried in Prairie Grove, Arkansas.
