= Michigan Walk of Fame =

Cultural display

Coordinates: 42°44′01″N 84°33′08″W

The Michigan Walk of Fame, styled on the famous Hollywood Walk of Fame, honors Michigan residents, past or present, who have made significant contributions to the state or nation.

Located along central Lansing's Washington Square, it aimed to be the first comprehensive Walk of Fame in the nation to honor the contributions of its residents on a statewide basis. Nominations were accepted from people around the state and nation.

The first group of Michigan Walk of Fame's inductees were honored on May 25, 2006, during Michigan Week. The 2006 inductees were announced on March 14. Stevie Wonder, Helen Thomas, Jeff Daniels, Dick Ford (Gerald Ford's brother), and many others attended the May 25 event to be formally inducted. The second group of inductees was announced on December 27, 2007. The Walk of Fame was discontinued after 2007.

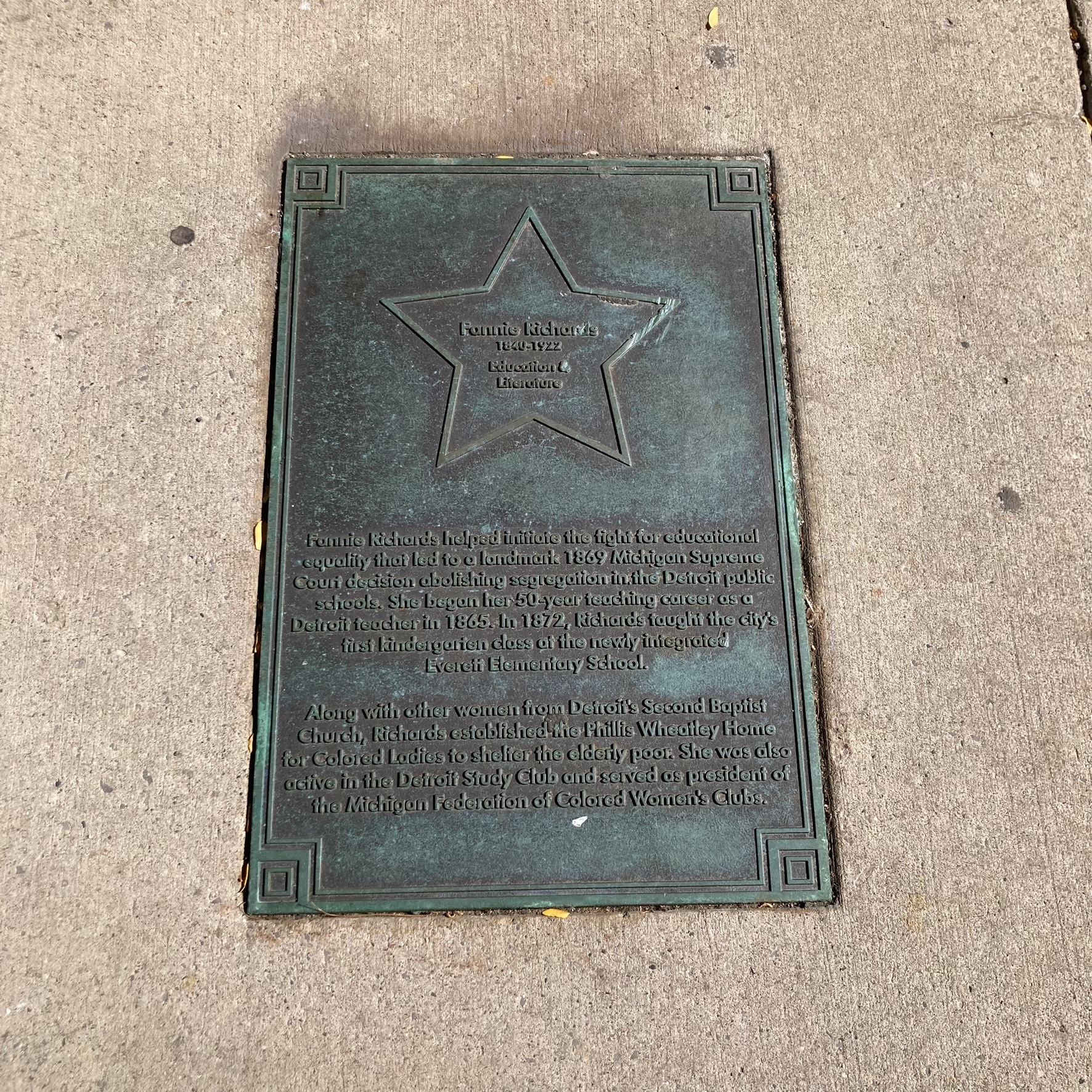
Fannie Richards's plaque on the Michigan Walk of Fame

== 2006 Inductees ==
- Jeff Daniels, actor
- Herbert Henry Dow, founder of the Dow Chemical Company
- Thomas Edison, inventor
- Gerald Ford, 38th President of the United States
- Henry Ford, automotive pioneer
- Emma Genevieve Gillette, the "mother" of the Michigan State Parks system
- Ernie Harwell, sportscaster
- Will Keith Kellogg, founder of Kellogg's
- Rosa Parks, civil rights activist
- Fannie M. Richards, pioneer African-American public school teacher in Detroit
- Helen Thomas, journalist
- Stevie Wonder, musician and composer

== 2007 Inductees ==
- Joe Louis Barrow, boxer
- Andrew Blackbird, Odawa trial leader and educator
- William C. Durant, automotive pioneer
- Gordie Howe, Detroit Red Wings player
- Pearl Kendrick, bacteriologist and co-developer of whooping cough vaccine
- Grace Eldering, public health scientist and co-developer of whooping cough vaccine
- Elijah McCoy, inventor
- Walter Reuther, 4th President of the United Automobile Workers
- Eero Saarinen, architect and designer of the Gateway Arch
- Jonas Salk, virologist and developer of the polio vaccine
- Mary C. Spencer, state librarian
- Danny Thomas, actor
