= Logan Gragg =

American baseball player (born 1998)

Free agent
- Pitcher
- Born: August 8, 1998 (age 28); Prairie Grove, Arkansas, U.S.
- Bats: Right Throws: Right

Logan Scott Gragg (born August 8, 1998) is an American professional baseball pitcher who is a free agent.

== Career ==
Gragg attended Prairie Grove High School in his hometown of Prairie Grove, Arkansas and later committed playing college baseball at Connors State College and spent two seasons there before transferring to Oklahoma State University.

=== St. Louis Cardinals ===
Gragg being selected in the eighth round, with the 245th overall selection, by the St. Louis Cardinals in the 2019 Major League Baseball draft and signed. He split his first professional season between the Low-A State College Spikes and Single-A Peoria Chiefs, recording a 3.15 ERA with 50 strikeouts over 17 games. Gragg did not play in a game in 2020 due to the cancellation of the minor league season because of the COVID-19 pandemic.

Gragg returned to action in 2021 with Peoria, making 25 appearances (20 starts), in which he posted a 2-7 record and 4.45 ERA with 80 strikeouts over 99 innings of work. He split the 2022 season between Peoria and the Double-A Springfield Cardinals, accumulating a 5–5 record and 4.82 ERA with 91 strikeouts and four saves in 102 2/3 innings pitched across 30 games (15 starts).

Gragg split the 2023 season between Springfield and the Triple-A Memphis Redbirds. In 27 appearances (19 starts) for the two affiliates, he compiled an aggregate 6–7 record and 4.98 ERA with 102 strikeouts and one save across 124 2/3 innings pitched. Gragg was released by the Cardinals organization during spring training on March 20, 2024.

=== Seattle Mariners ===
On March 28, 2024, Gragg signed a minor league contract with the Seattle Mariners organization. In 32 appearances split between the Double-A Arkansas Travelers and Triple-A Tacoma Rainiers, he registered a combined 5–0 record and 3.47 ERA with 51 strikeouts across 59 2/3 innings pitched. Gragg elected free agency following the season on November 4.
