= Jan Poolman =

Dutch microbiologist and bacterial vaccine expert

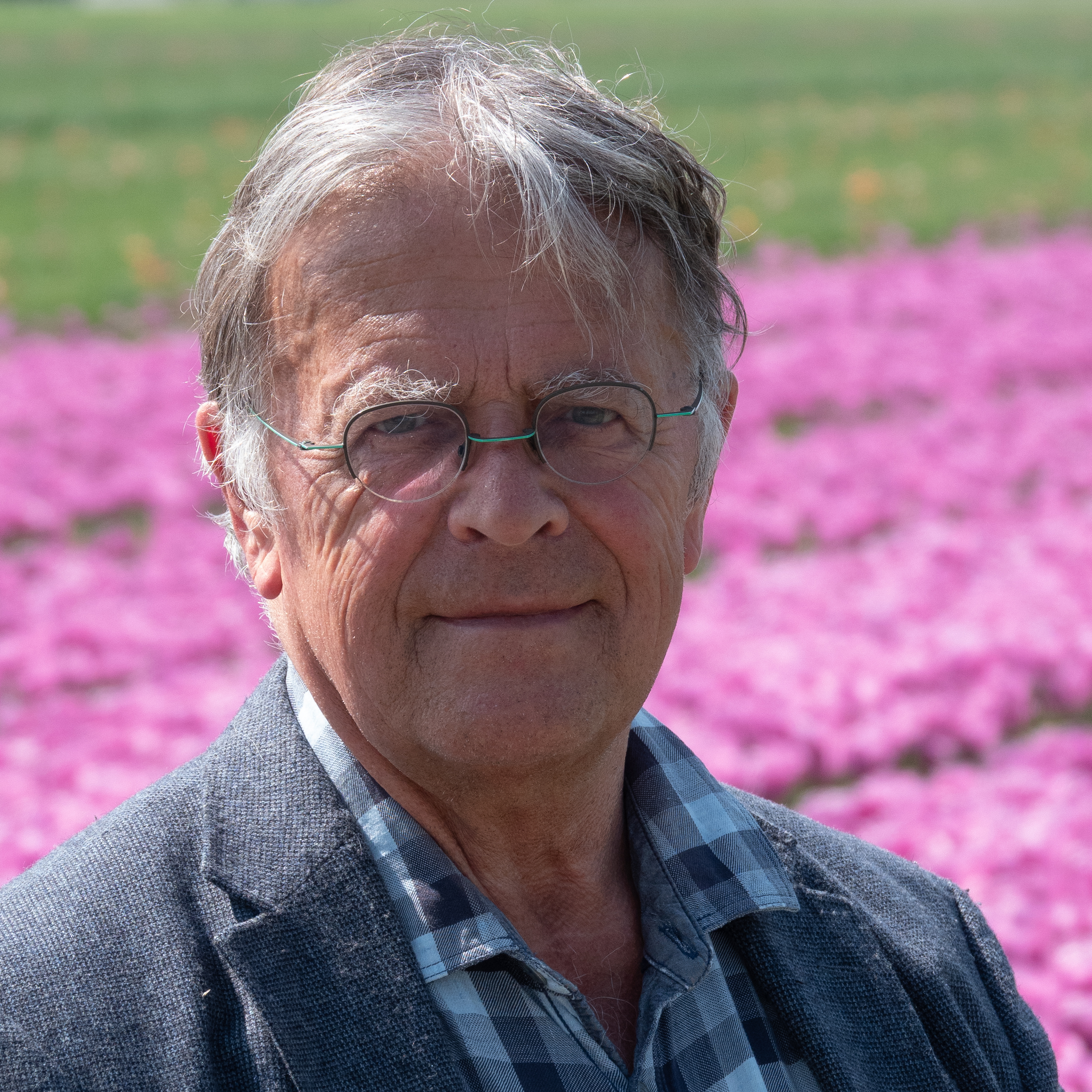
Jan Poolman (2025)

Jan T Poolman Ph.D. (1951) is a Dutch microbiologist and bacterial vaccine expert. His life has been dedicated to the discovery and development of bacterial vaccines. He is known for his role in the development of meningococcal, pneumococcal, pertussis, Haemophilus influenzae type b (Hib), E. coli and S. aureus vaccines.

== Education and Research ==
Poolman earned his master’s degree from the University of Amsterdam (UVA) in 1975, where he studied chemistry and specialized in the field of microbiology.

He started his career as assistant-professor at the University of Amsterdam, Medical Microbiology department (1975-1986) and the Dutch Reference Laboratory for Bacterial Meningitis, including a NIH Fogarty Fellowship in 1982 and a thesis on the meningococcal cell surface structure. Next he became head of Bacterial Vaccine Research & Development (R&D) at the Dutch National Public Health Institute (RIVM, 1986-1996) initiating DTaPIPVHib, meningococcal and pneumococcal vaccine R&D activities, also acting as project leader for the newly created Dutch-Nordic Consortium combining activities from the Dutch and Scandinavian Public Health Institutes with a focus on pneumococcal vaccine R&D.

He then moved on to SmithKline Beecham Biologicals (now GSK Vaccines) in Rixensart, Belgium (1997-2011) as head of bacterial vaccine R&D contributing to the licensure of several bacterial vaccines including whole cell and acellular pertussis and Hib combinations, meningococcal and pneumococcal vaccines. From GSK Dr Poolman moved back from Belgium to The Netherlands to join the vaccine endeavor by Johnson & Johnson (2011-2024), creating a Bacterial Vaccine R&D team with projects centered around adult bacterial vaccines aiming to prevent bacteremia and sepsis induced by E. coli and S. aureus. Extraintestinal Pathogenic E. coli ExPEC 9-valent O-polysaccharide conjugate is currently undergoing a Phase 3 efficacy study evaluation.

During his career Poolman contributed to two World Health Organization (WHO)-reports as an industry expert on bacterial vaccines. In 2009, Poolman contributed to a WHO report on the topic of pneumococcal conjugate vaccines. In 2023, he contributed to a WHO report as an industry expert on bacterial vaccines through a public consultation by sharing his perspectives on the role of bacterial vaccines in reducing AMR.

Poolman is a member of the Board of Trustees of the Jenner Vaccine Foundation. In addition, Poolman is a member of the Scientific Advisory Board of Inventprise and he is a member of the Scientific Advisory Board of the World Vaccine Congress Europe.

After his retirement in September 2024 from Johnson & Johnson, Dr Poolman now functions as executive scientific advisor for several companies and organizations.

== Publications ==
Poolman has been an author or co-author of around 290 scientific publications on bacterial vaccines in his career of over 45 years; his publications have been cited more than 13,500 times. Key topics of his publications, exampled by references to the abstracts of a set of selected publications, are: Group B Meningococcus, Haemophilus influenzae type b (Hib), Pertussis, Pneumococcus, Meningococcus ACWY, ExPEC, and S. aureus.

== Personal life ==
Poolman is born 16 June 1951 in Broek in Waterland, the Netherlands; he is married and jointly with his second wife they have a mixed family with five children and two grandchildren.
