= Farmington Schools =

Farmington Schools may refer to:

- Farmington School District, Arkansas
- Farmington Public Schools (Connecticut)
- Farmington Public Schools (Michigan)
- Farmington Municipal Schools, New Mexico
