= HHE =

HHE may refer to:

- Haywards Heath railway station, a railway station in Sussex, England
- Health Hazard Evaluation Program, in the United States
- Heli Holland, a Dutch helicopter operator
- Helium hydride ion (HHe+)
- Hhe, a proposed gender-neutral pronoun for English
- Historic Hotels of Europe
- Home and Hospital Education (HHE) for students with a medical condition.
- Hypotonic-hyporesponsive episode an adverse reaction to vaccination.
