= Walnut Grove Presbyterian Church =

Historic church in Arkansas, United States

- U.S. National Register of Historic Places
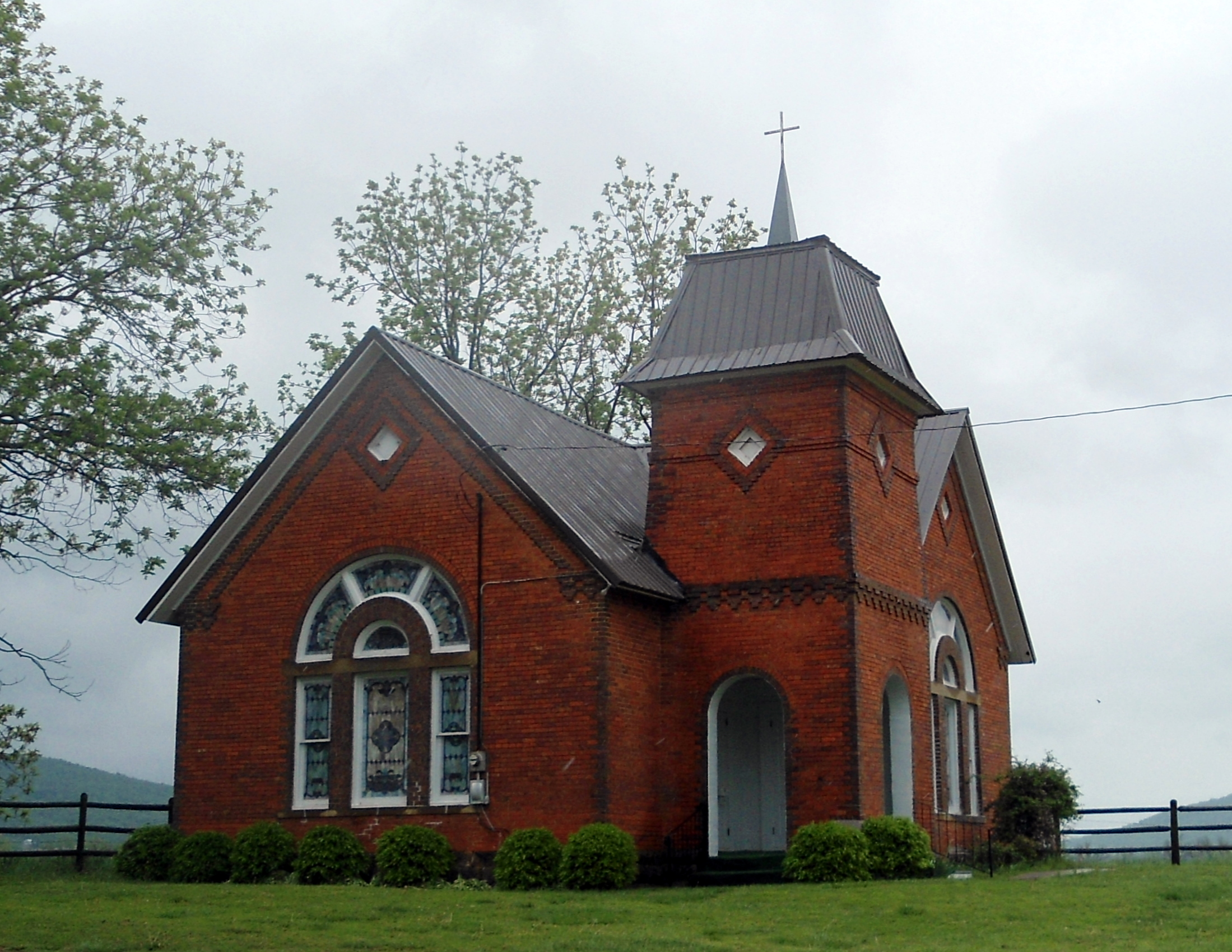

- Location within Arkansas Location within the United States
- Nearest city: Farmington, Arkansas
- Coordinates: 36°0′8″N 94°16′3″W
- Area: less than one acre
- Built: 1903
- Built by: Rev. Nathan Hanks, William Thomas Hamblen Jr.
- Architectural style: Romanesque, Late Gothic Revival
- NRHP reference No.: 95001411
- Added to NRHP: December 7, 1995

Walnut Grove Presbyterian Church is a historic church in rural Washington County, Arkansas. It is located southwest of Farmington, on the east side of Arkansas Highway 170. It is a modest single-story brick church, with a cross-gable roof and a squat square belltower. Each of its gable ends is adorned with a large three-part stained glass window. It was built in 1903 for a congregation established in 1856, and is a locally distinctive vernacular interpretation of the Romanesque Revival.

The church was added to the National Register in 1995.

== See also ==
- National Register of Historic Places listings in Washington County, Arkansas
