= Ty Tice =

American baseball player (born 1996)

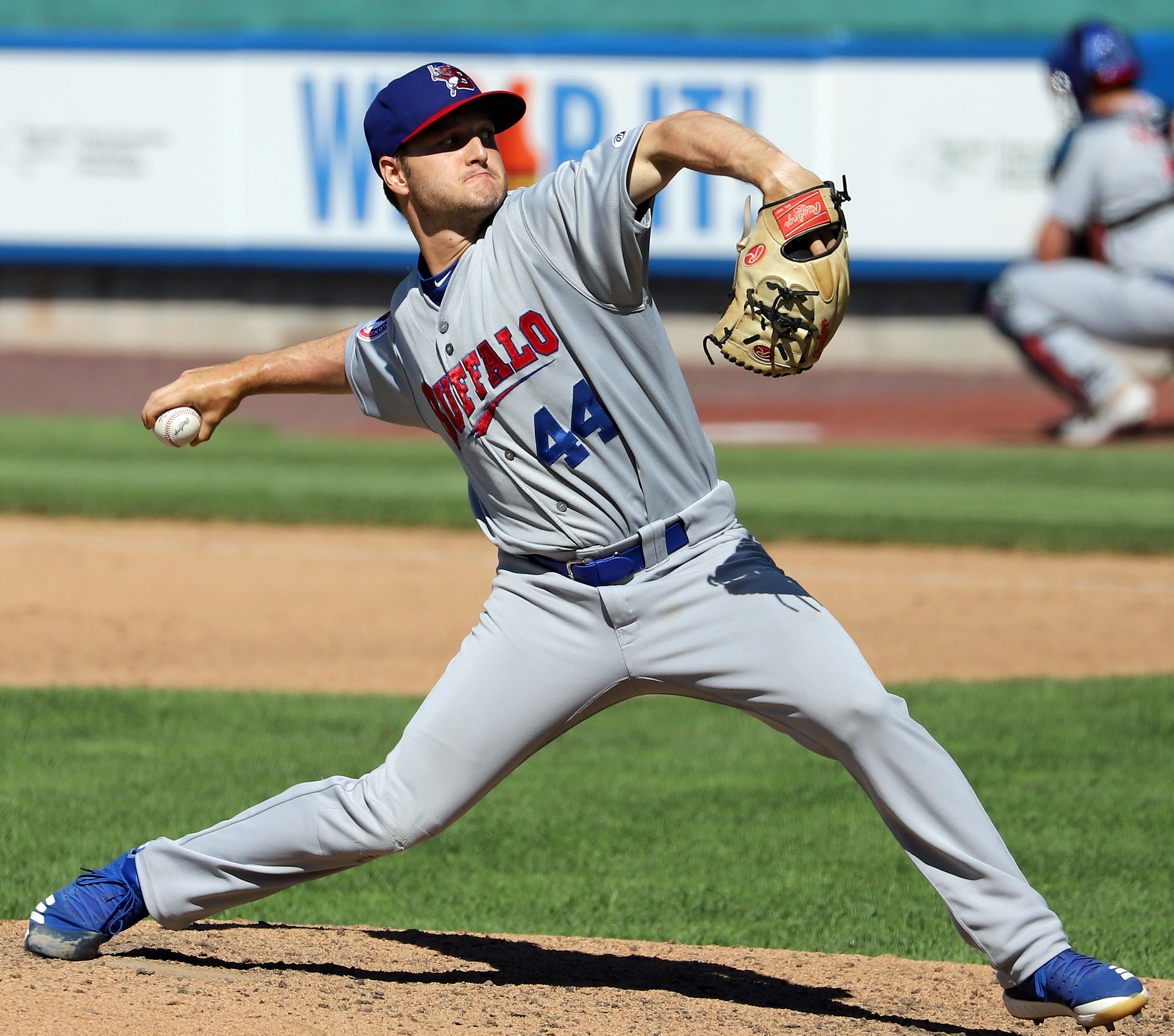
- Tice with the Buffalo Bisons in 2019
- Pitcher
- Born: July 4, 1996 (age 29); Prairie Grove, Arkansas, U.S.
- Batted: Left Threw: Right

MLB debut
- April 9, 2021, for the Toronto Blue Jays

Last MLB appearance
- June 21, 2021, for the Atlanta Braves

MLB statistics
- Win–loss record: 0–0
- Earned run average: 4.50
- Strikeouts: 6
- Stats at Baseball Reference

Teams
- Toronto Blue Jays (2021); Atlanta Braves (2021)

Ty Christian Tice (born July 4, 1996) is an American former professional baseball pitcher. He played in Major League Baseball (MLB) for the Toronto Blue Jays and Atlanta Braves.

== Playing career ==
=== Toronto Blue Jays ===
Tice attended Prairie Grove High School in Prairie Grove, Arkansas and played college baseball at the University of Central Arkansas. He was drafted by the Toronto Blue Jays in the 17th round, with the 489th overall selection, of the 2017 Major League Baseball draft. He made his professional debut in 2017 with the rookie ball Bluefield Blue Jays, recording a 1.05 ERA in 25 2/3 innings of work.

In 2018, Tice split the season between the Single-A Lansing Lugnuts and the High-A Dunedin Blue Jays, posting a 7-7 record and 2.29 ERA in 44 appearances between the teams. In 2019, he split the year between the Double-A New Hampshire Fisher Cats and the Triple-A Buffalo Bisons, pitching to a 3-4 record and 2.34 ERA on the year. Tice did not play in a game in 2020 due to the cancellation of the minor league season because of the COVID-19 pandemic.

On November 20, 2020, the Blue Jays added Tice to their 40-man roster to protect him from the Rule 5 draft. On April 9, 2021, Tice was promoted to the major leagues for the first time. He made his MLB debut that day against the Los Angeles Angels, throwing two shutout innings. Tice recorded a 5.14 ERA with 6 strikeouts across 4 games before being designated for assignment on May 30.

=== Atlanta Braves ===
On June 3, 2021, Tice was traded to the Atlanta Braves in exchange for cash considerations. Tice only made one appearance for Atlanta, pitching a scoreless inning, and struggled to a 7.36 ERA in 11 appearances with the Triple-A Gwinnett Stripers.

=== Arizona Diamondbacks ===
On July 21, 2021, Tice was claimed off waivers by the Arizona Diamondbacks. On August 5, Tice cleared waivers and was assigned outright to the Triple-A Reno Aces. He was released on July 20, 2022.

=== Atlanta Braves (second stint) ===
On January 4, 2023, Tice signed a minor league contract with the Atlanta Braves organization. In 45 appearances split between the Double–A Mississippi Braves and Triple–A Gwinnett Stripers, he struggled to a 6.37 ERA with 83 strikeouts and 3 saves across 53 2/3 innings of work. Tice elected free agency following the season on November 6.

=== Washington Nationals ===
On December 18, 2023, Tice signed a minor league contract with the Washington Nationals. He split the 2024 campaign between the Double-A Harrisburg Senators and Triple-A Rochester Red Wings. In 48 appearances for the two affiliates, Tice posted a combined 2-3 record and 5.18 ERA with 64 strikeouts and two saves across 57 1/3 innings pitched. He elected free agency following the season on November 4, 2024.

== Coaching career ==
On April 14, 2025, Tice was hired to serve as an assistant coach for Shiloh Christian School in Springdale, Arkansas.
