= Benjamin Franklin Medal (American Philosophical Society) =

Award

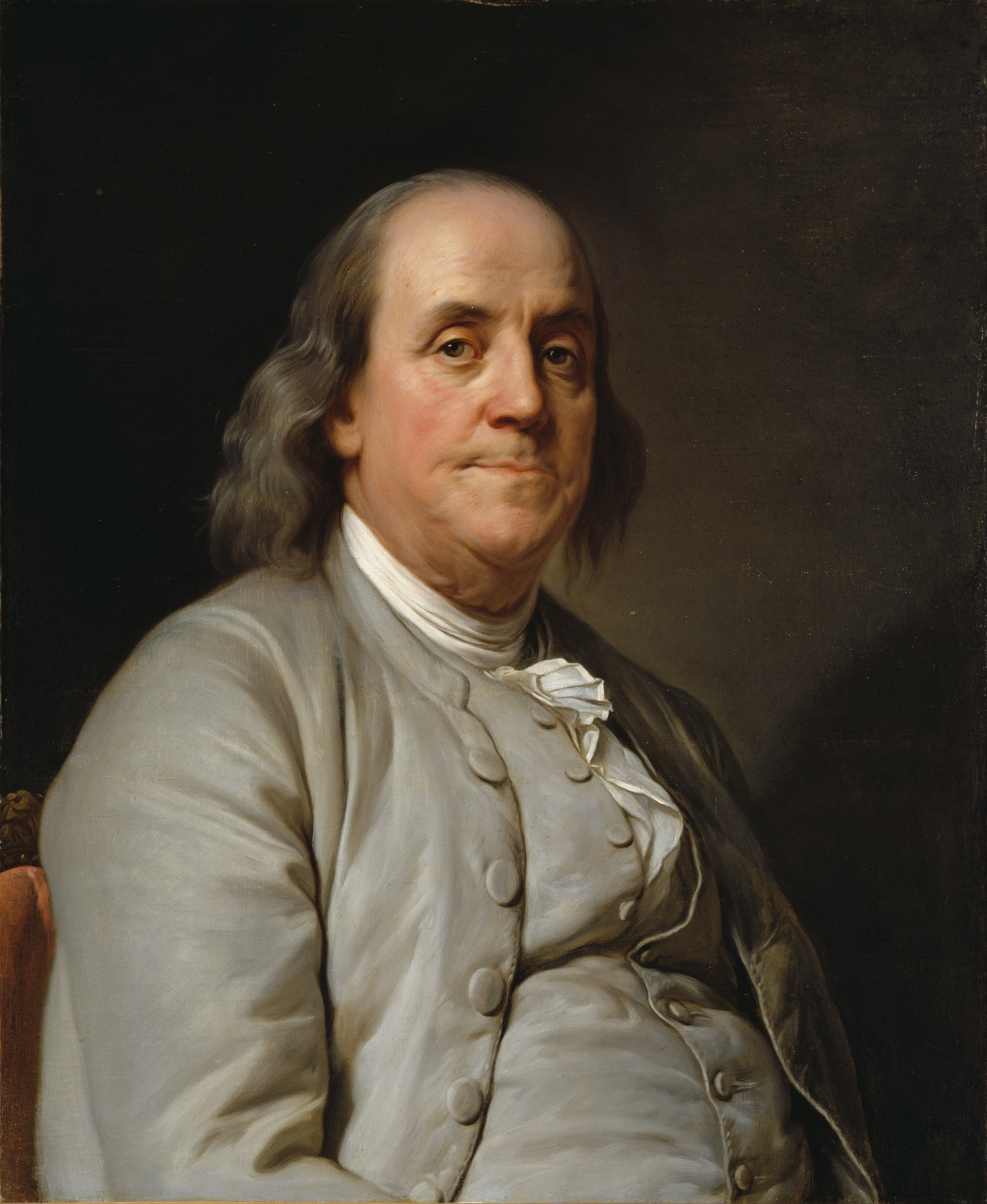
Benjamin Franklin, after whom this medal is named. A portrait made by Joseph Duplessis (ca. 1785).

The Benjamin Franklin Medal presented by the American Philosophical Society located in Philadelphia, Pennsylvania, U.S.A., also called Benjamin Franklin Bicentennial Medal, is awarded since 1906. The originally called "Philosophical Society" was founded in 1743 by Benjamin Franklin. The award was created to remember the 200th anniversary of the birthday of Franklin. The Museum of Fine Arts in Boston has this medal in its collection.

The medal was created by the brothers Augustus and Louis St. Gaudens.

== Recipients ==
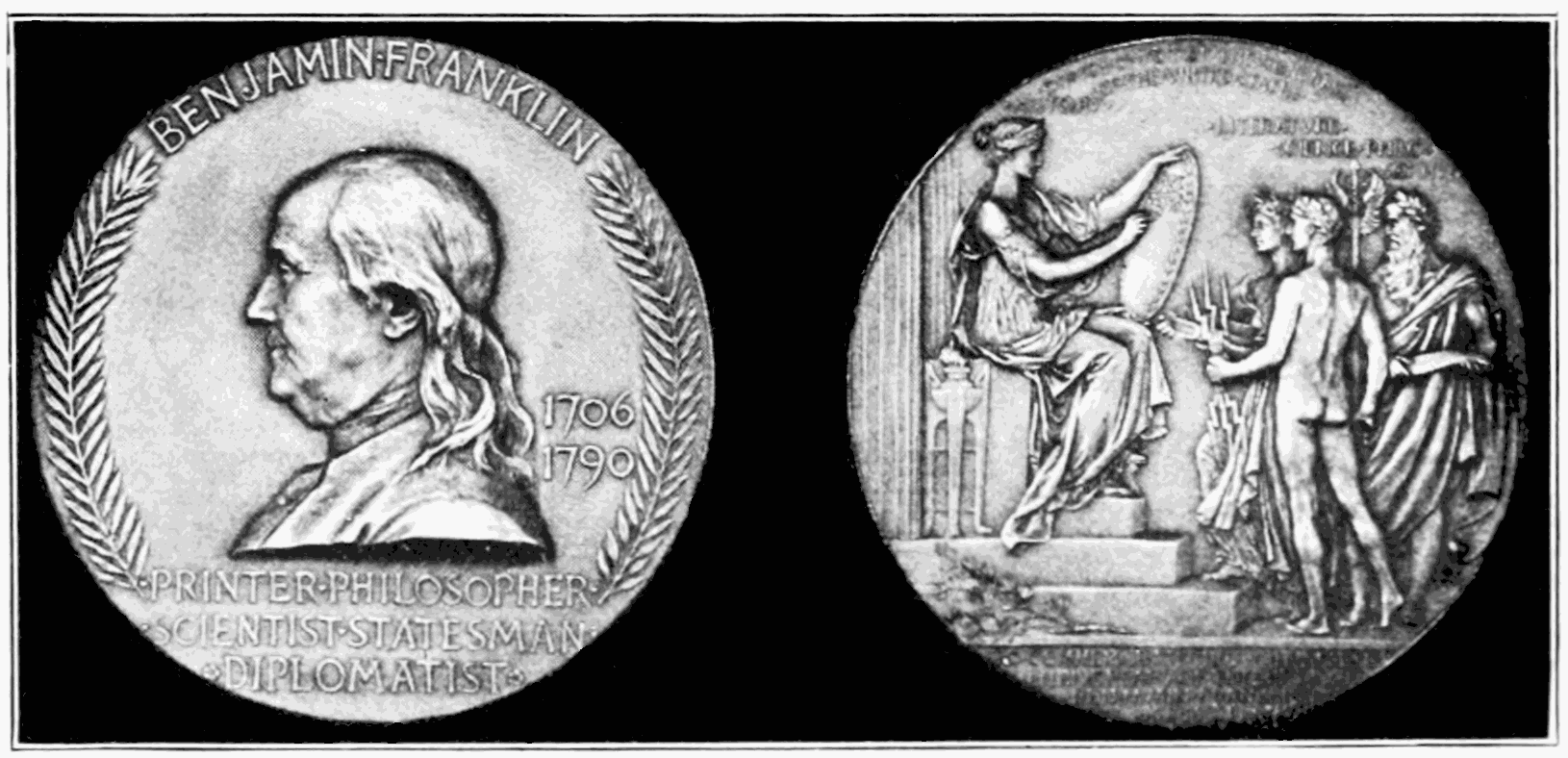
The Benjamin Franklin Medal

Recipients received this award under different names for different reasons:

- The first medal was given to the Republic of France in 1906.
- 1906: Cleveland Abbe, meteorologist
- 1921: Franklin Medal to Marie Curie.

=== Benjamin Franklin Medal ===
Awarded for notable services to the American Philosophical Society, between 1937 and 1983.

- 1937: William Lyon Phelps
- 1939: Eduard Beneš
- 1940: Edward S. Corwin
- 1941: Hugh S. Taylor
- 1943: James B. Conant
- 1945: Arthur H. Compton
- 1947: Douglas S. Freeman
- 1949: William E. Lingelbach
- 1979: George W. Corner
- 1982: Julia A. Noonan
- 1983: Whitfield J. Bell

=== Benjamin Franklin Medal for Distinguished Achievement in the Humanities or Sciences ===
Awarded between 1985 and 1991.

- 1985: Charles Brenton Huggins
- 1986: Helen Brooke Taussig
- 1987: Otto Neugebauer and Samuel Noah Kramer
- 1988: Sune Bergström and Jonathan Rhoads
- 1989: John Archibald Wheeler
- 1990: James Bennett Pritchard, Britton Chance and Crawford H. Greenewalt
- 1991: Lyman Spitzer

=== Benjamin Franklin Medal for Distinguished Public Service ===
Awarded since 1987.

- 1987: Margaret Thatcher
- 1988: Warren Earl Burger
- 1988: Thomas J. Watson, Jr.
- 1989: Paul Mellon
- 1992: Thurgood Marshall
- 1993: Walter H. Annenberg
- 1994: Linus Pauling
- 1995: William T. Golden
- 1996: Edmund N. Carpenter, II
- 1997: William W. Scranton
- 1998: Alan Greenspan
- 1999: George J. Mitchell
- 2000: Nelson Mandela
- 2002: Mary Robinson
- 2003: Sandra Day O'Connor
- 2004: James D. Wolfensohn
- 2005: Sam Nunn
- 2006: John Hope Franklin
- 2011: Arlin Adams
- 2018: Bryan Stevenson

=== Benjamin Franklin Medal for Distinguished Achievement in the Sciences ===
Awarded since 1993.

- 1993: Emily Hartshorne Mudd
- 1993: Michael Atiyah
- 1993: C.N. Yang
- 1993: Barbara McClintock
- 1993: Ruth Patrick
- 1995: Ernst Mayr
- 1996: Victor A. McKusick
- 1997: Herman H. Goldstine
- 1998: Edward O. Wilson
- 1999: Philip A. Sharp
- 1999: Frederick C. Robbins
- 2000: William O. Baker
- 2001: Alexander G. Bearn
- 2001: Francis H. C. Crick and James D. Watson
- 2002: Joshua Lederberg
- 2003: Janet D. Rowley
- 2004: Steven Weinberg
- 2005: Hans A. Bethe
- 2006: Eric R. Kandel
- 2016: Thomas E. Starzl
- 2018: Mary-Claire King
- 2023: Martine A. Rothblatt
