= Southern Mercantile Building =

- U.S. National Register of Historic Places
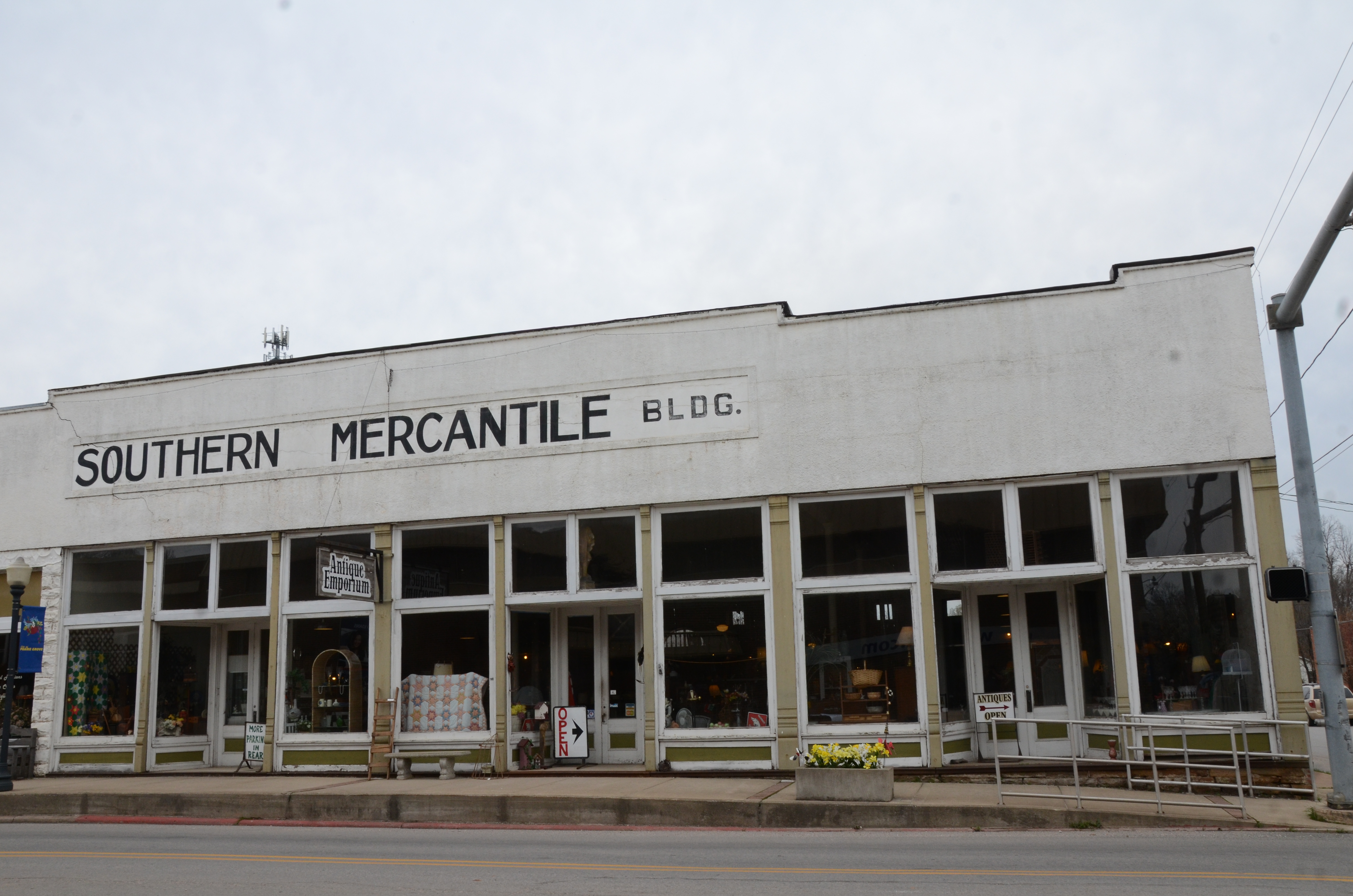

- Location within Arkansas Location within the United States
- Location: 107 E. Buchanan, Prairie Grove, Arkansas
- Coordinates: 35°58′31″N 94°19′0″W
- Area: less than one acre
- Architectural style: Vernacular commercial
- NRHP reference No.: 90000898
- Added to NRHP: June 14, 1990

The Southern Mercantile Building is a historic commercial building at 107 East Buchanan in Prairie Grove, Arkansas. It is a single-story brick and masonry structure, with a stuccoed parapet. It consists of two separate buildings, one dating to 1883, that were combined under the unifying parapet about 1920. The building is the largest and best-preserved example of that period's commercial architecture in the city. It served for many years as Prairie Grove's largest and most important general store, finally closing its doors in 1987.

The buildings was listed on the National Register of Historic Places in 1990.

== See also ==
- National Register of Historic Places listings in Washington County, Arkansas
