= Fannie M. Richards =

American educator (1840–1922)

- Born: October 1, 1840; Fredericksburg, Virginia, U.S.
- Died: February 13, 1922 (aged 81)
- Occupation: Educator

Fannie M. Richards (October 1, 1840 – February 13, 1922) was an American educator. She created the first kindergarten program in Michigan, and for that was inducted into the Michigan Women's Hall of Fame. She also protested against the segregation of Detroit Public Schools.

== Biography ==
Richards was born on October 1, 1840, in Fredericksburg, Virginia, to Aldoph and Maria Richards. She soon moved to Toronto, and was educated both there and in Germany, working in Germany with German educator Friedrich Fröbel. She later moved to Detroit, and was allowed to teach there despite not having the correct license. In 1863, she opened a private school for African-American children and, five years later was appointed the Instructor at Colored School Number 2.

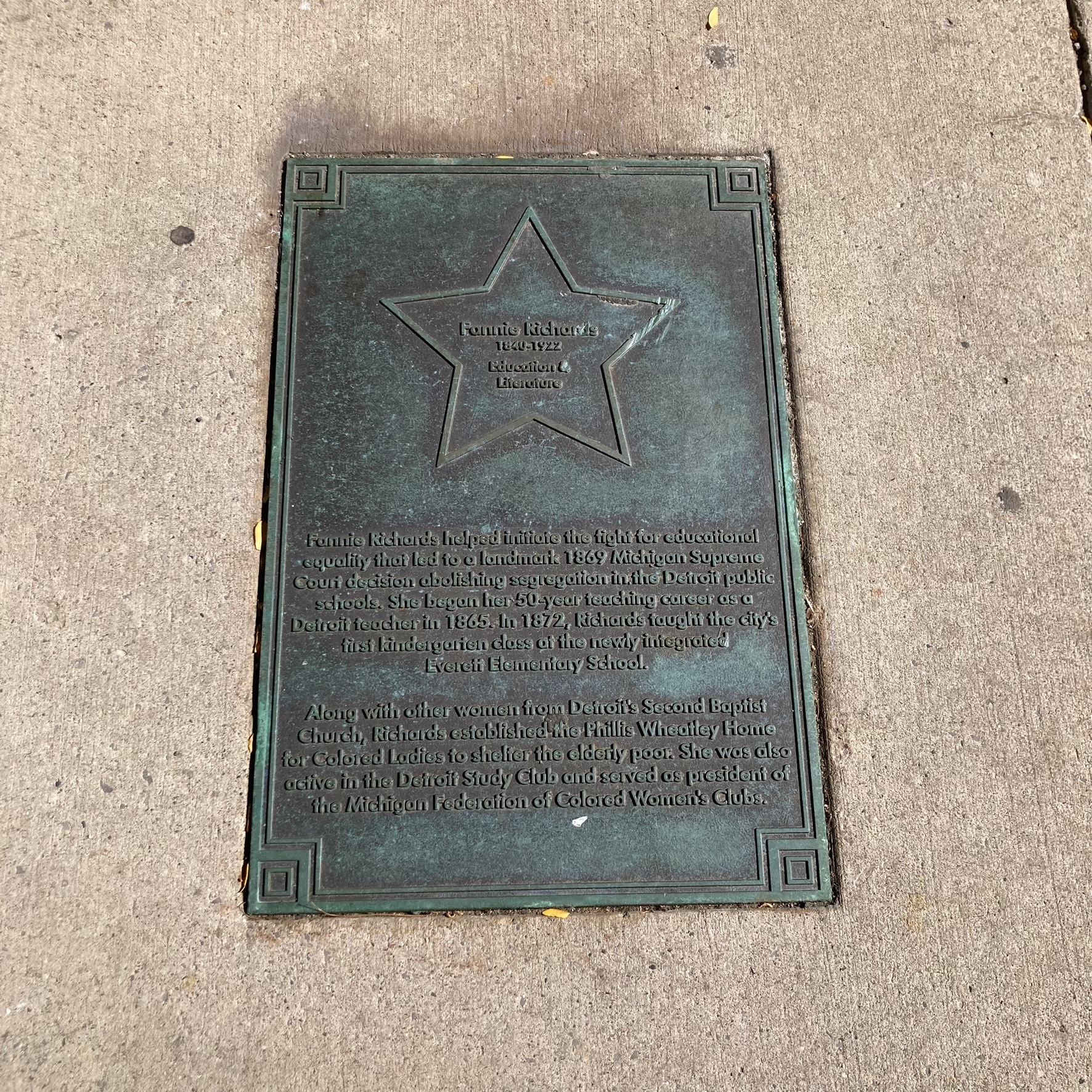
Fannie Richards's plaque on the Michigan Walk of Fame

Working with John J. Bagley, Richards protested against the segregated school system in Detroit; which the Michigan Supreme Court eventually mandated the abolition of in 1871. That same year she started working at Everett Elementary School, and there established the first kindergarten class in Michigan. Richards also founded the Phyllis Wheatly Home for Aged Colored Ladies in Detroit, and cofounded the Michigan Association of Colored Women. She retired from teaching in 1915. Richards died February 13, 1922.

Richards home was added to the State of Michigan Registry of Historic Sites on November 14, 1974. A portrait of Miss Fannie M. Richards, painted by Detroit artist Telitha Cumi Bowens, was included in the 1988–1989 exhibit "Ain't I A Woman" at the Museum of African American History, Detroit. The exhibit featured a dozen prominent Black women from the state of Michigan, including Ethelene Jones Crockett, M.D., the Honorable Cora M. Brown, and Dr. Violet T. Lewis.
