= Farmington Township, Washington County, Arkansas =

Township of Farmington
- Township
- Farmington Township's location in Washington County

- Washington County's location in Arkansas
- Coordinates: 36°3′1.9″N 94°15′23.2″W
- Country: United States
- State: Arkansas
- County: Washington

Area
  - Total: 4.8 sq mi (12 km^{2})
  - Land: 4.8 sq mi (12 km^{2})
  - Water: 0 sq mi (0 km^{2})
- Elevation: 1,217 ft (371 m)

Population (2000)
  - Total: 3,605
  - Density: 751/sq mi (290/km^{2})
- Time zone: UTC-6 (CST)
  - Summer (DST): UTC-5 (CDT)
- ZIP code: 72730
- Area code: 479
- GNIS feature ID: 2406951

The Township of Farmington is one of thirty-seven townships in Washington County, Arkansas, USA. As of the 2000 census, its total population was 3605.

== Geography ==
According to the United States Census Bureau, Farmington Township covers an area of 4.8 square miles (12 km^{2}); all land.

=== Cities, towns, villages ===
- Farmington

=== Cemeteries ===
The township contains two cemeteries.

=== Major routes ===
- US Route 62
- Arkansas Highway 170
