= Alexander Gordon Bearn =

British doctor and scientist

- Born: March 29, 1923; Surrey, England
- Died: May 15, 2009 (aged 86); Philadelphia, United States
- Other names: Alick Bearn
- Occupations: physician, scientist and author
- Known for: Human genetics, Wilson's disease

Alexander Gordon Bearn informally Alick Bearn (March 29, 1923 – May 15, 2009), a physician, scientist and author, was professor at Rockefeller University and Cornell University Medical College. He was a member of the National Academy of Sciences, and had been Executive Officer of the American Philosophical Society. He died Friday, May 15, 2009, in Philadelphia. Prior to his death Bearn was working on a family history that followed the Bearn family from Béarn, France to Angus, Scotland and finally to the United States.

== Education ==
Bearn was educated in England at Epsom College, and received his M.B., B.S. and M.D. degrees from the University of London. He came to the Rockefeller University in 1951 and began his work on the genetics of rare metabolic diseases. He spent a sabbatical term at the Galton Laboratory at the University of London in 1958–59. In 1964 he was called to the Rockefeller University as professor and senior physician.

== Career ==
In 1966 he became professor and chairman of the Department of Medicine at Cornell University Medical College and physician-in-chief at New York Hospital. He founded the first human genetics laboratory at the Medical College, and with colleagues at the Rockefeller initiated the joint M.D./Ph.D. program at the institutions. He remained at Cornell until 1979 when he was named senior vice-president for medical and scientific affairs of Merck, Sharpe & Dohme, International Division, from which he retired in 1988.

His work in the area of human genetics and liver disease led him to define the genetic nature of Wilson's disease, which affects the liver and brain, and showed that the disease was associated with a deficiency in the blood of ceruloplasmin, a copper-binding protein. He also discovered that the urine level of B2 microglobulin, was a sensitive indicator of proximal renal tubular damage. This protein was later shown to be of great immunological importance as a part of the human leukocyte antigen histo-compatibility system. His laboratory also described a number of genetic variants in serum proteins that allowed for later work in serum enzymes.

== Authorship ==
Bearn was the author of many scientific articles. He has also written three scientific biographies Archibald Garrod and the Individuality of Man, (Oxford University Press, 1993), Sir Clifford Allbutt (1834-1925): Scholar and Physician (Royal College of Physicians of London, 2007, ISBN 9781860163029), and Sir Francis Fraser: A Canny Scot Shapes British Medicine. (Book Guild Publishing, 2008, ISBN 9781846242076).

== Memberships and honours ==
Dr. Bearn was a member of the National Academy of Sciences, the Institute of Medicine, and other societies, including the Harvey Society, President 1972–73, and the American Society of Human Genetics, President 1971. He was elected a member of the American Philosophical Society in 1972 and served as a vice president (1988–1996), and executive officer (from 1997 until his retirement in 2002). He received the Society's Benjamin Franklin Medal in 2001. He was a fellow of the Norwegian Academy of Science and Letters from 1975.

He served as a Trustee of the Howard Hughes Medical Institute for eighteen years, becoming Trustee Emeritus in 2005. In 1970 Bearn joined the Rockefeller Board of Trustees and was elected Trustee Emeritus in 1998. In 2002 he received the David Rockefeller Award. He also served as a trustee of the Helen Hay Whitney Foundation, the Josiah Macy, Jr. Foundation and as an overseer of the Jackson Laboratory.

During the academic year 1996–97, he was named Distinguished Visiting Fellow at Christ's College where he began his research on Clifford Allbutt. Bearn has a number of honorary degrees including an M.D.(hon) from Catholic University, Korea (1968), Docteur (hc), Paris René Descartes (1975) and Honorary Alumnus, Cornell University Medical College, New York (1983).
