= Rancher, Montana =

- Unincorporated community
- Location within Montana Location within the United States
- Coordinates: 46°15′50″N 107°24′10″W
- Country: United States
- State: Montana
- County: Treasure
- Elevation: 2,684 ft (818 m)
- Time zone: UTC-7 (Mountain (MST))
  - Summer (DST): UTC-6 (MDT)
- GNIS feature ID: 1721505

Rancher is a ghost town in Treasure County, Montana, United States.

== Notable person ==
- Grace Eldering, public health scientist, was born in Rancher.
