= Prairie Grove High School =

Location
- 500 Cole Drive; Prairie Grove, Arkansas 72753; United States
- 35°59′5″N 94°19′3″W

Information
- Founded: 1901 (125 years ago)
- Status: Open
- School district: Prairie Grove School District
- NCES District ID: 0511760
- Authority: Arkansas Department of Education (ADE)
- CEEB code: 042105
- NCES School ID: 051176000895
- Teaching staff: 82.57 (FTE)
- Grades: 9-12
- Enrollment: 595 (2023-2024)
- Student to teacher ratio: 7.21
- Education system: ADE Smart Core curriculum
- Colors: Black and gold
- Athletics conference: 4A Region 1 (2012–14)
- Mascot: Tiger
- Team name: Prairie Grove Tigers
- Accreditation: ADE; AdvancED (1966–)
- Communities served: Prairie Grove
- Feeder schools: Prairie Grove Middle School (6–8)
- Affiliation: Arkansas Activities Association
- Website: www.pgtigers.org/o/high-school

Prairie Grove High School is an accredited comprehensive public high school serving students in grades nine through twelve in Prairie Grove, Arkansas, United States. Established in 1901, the school supports families in Prairie Grove, a portion of Farmington, and nearby unincorporated communities in Washington County; it is the sole high school administered by the Prairie Grove School District.

== History ==
The fringe town of Prairie Grove saw its first school established by the Cumberland Presbyterian church around 1831. The building was later demolished and another combination church / school building was built on the site in the late 1800s. Each of these schools taught students only at the elementary level. In 1883, the Prairie Grove Institute, also known as the Methodist Academy, established the community’s first school that taught all twelve grades. In 1901, the institute became part of the Prairie Grove School District. The public school system started around 1900, and five students became charter members of the first graduating class in 1905. In 1911, a three-story school was erected at the site of the Methodist Academy and remained in use until the early 1950s when new buildings were constructed north of downtown. In fall 2004, a new high school building was built that remains in use.

In 2022 the high school had 615 pupils.

== Academics ==
The Prairie Grove High School is accredited by the Arkansas Department of Education (ADE) and has been accredited by AdvancED since 1966.

=== Curriculum ===
The assumed course of study follows the Smart Core curriculum developed the Arkansas Department of Education (ADE), which requires students to complete 22 credit units before graduation. Students engage in regular and career focus courses and exams and may select Advanced Placement (AP) coursework and exams that provide an opportunity to receive college credit. According to the student handbook, exceptional students may be awarded an honors diploma based on participation in 12 of the 26 offered AP courses and grade point averages (GPA) resulting in three awards: Honors diploma (GPA 3.0 after 8 semesters), Honors Graduate status (GPA 3.5 after 8 semesters) or Highest Honors Graduate status (GPA 4.0 after 8 semesters).

=== Awards and recognition ===
In 2012, Prairie Grove School District and its high school were recognized in the AP District of the Year Awards program in the College Board's 3rd Annual Honor Roll that consisted of 539 U.S. public school districts (6 in Arkansas) that simultaneously achieved increases in access to AP® courses for a broader number of students and improved the rate at which their AP students earned scores of 3 or higher on an AP Exam.

== Extracurricular activities ==
The Prairie Grove High School mascot is the tiger with school colors of black and gold.

=== Athletics ===
For the 2012–14 school years, the Prairie Grove Tigers participate in the 4A Classification within the 4A Region 1 Conference as administered by the Arkansas Activities Association. The Tigers compete in various interscholastic activities including football, volleyball, golf (boys/girls), cross country (boys/girls), basketball (boys/girls), baseball, fastpitch softball, tennis (boys/girls), track and field (boys/girls), and competitive cheer.

In March 2010, Prairie Grove won its first Class 4A championship in girls basketball. In December 2011, Prairie Grove won the 4A state championship for competitive cheer.

=== Clubs and traditions ===
In December 2009, the Prairie Grove FFA recorded the state's first win in the Livestock Judging event held at the national convention of the National FFA Organization.

== Notable alumni ==
- Jalen Beeks, MLB Player (Tampa Bay Rays)
- Lance Eads, former member of the Arkansas General Assembly
- Margaret Pittman, bacteriologist; first female to lead a National Institute of Health laboratory
- Ty Tice, MLB Player (Toronto Blue Jays, Atlanta Braves)
