= Loney Gordon =

African-American chemist

Loney Clinton Gordon
- Born: Loney Clinton; October 8, 1915; Arkansas
- Died: July 16, 1999 (aged 83); East Lansing, Michigan
- Education: Michigan State College
- Scientific career
- Fields: Bacteriology, Public Health

Loney O. Clinton Gordon (1915–1999), also known as Loney Clinton, was an African American chemistry laboratory assistant whose bacteriological virulence research led to a pertussis vaccine in 1942, an effective protection against whooping cough developed in Grand Rapids, Michigan, with doctors Pearl Kendrick and Grace Eldering.

== Early life and education ==
Gordon was born in Arkansas in 1915 and moved to West Michigan with her family as a young child. In 1939, Gordon earned a bachelor's degree in home economics and chemistry from Michigan State College (now Michigan State University) and began her career as a dietitian in a mental institution in Virginia. In a 1999 interview, Gordon said she was given inadequate living quarters and was treated poorly by medical staff. In pursuit of better employment, she returned to Grand Rapids but found that male chefs would not take orders from a black female dietitian. She was hired as a laboratory assistant at the Michigan Department of Health, and joined the doctors Pearl Kendrick and Grace Eldering in their evening effort to develop an effective pertussis vaccine — an effort that took place in addition to the department's usual responsibilities.

The Grand Rapids Press wrote "Gordon's vigilant research was a key component in developing a successful vaccine." Gordon later spoke highly of Kendrick and Eldering, saying they were good friends and that they respected her ambition: "They were like two jewels in a crown for me because they dearly loved me and they gave me access to whatever other organisms that I wanted to study in the lab."

Gordon continued to work as a microbiologist, and trained scientists and hospital technicians in parasitology and bacteriology. Dr. Kenneth Wilcox, an associate of Gordon's, described Gordon as a woman who always stood her ground and expressed her opinions.

After World War II, her scientific work led to her selection for traveling to Europe and the Middle East with the National Council of Christian and Jews to “take the pulse of the people” in the area. She retired from the Michigan Department of Health in 1978.

In 1997, she was featured in a display by the Grand Rapids Public Library, which prompted State Representative Lynne Martinez of Lansing, who before the display had no idea that Gordon was alive, living in Lansing, and played a role in developing the vaccine, to honor Gordon with a House Resolution. She died in 1999. She was inducted into the Michigan Women's Hall of Fame in 2000.

== Research ==
In the early 1940s, Gordon tested thousands of culture plates, trying to find the culture that would have sufficient virulence to make the vaccine. The work was conducted at Western Michigan Laboratories, later known as Kent Community Hospital, located in Grand Rapids, Michigan. Gordon's work focused on pertussis cultures and virulence of the bacterium Bordetella pertussis. Gordon's analysis of pertussis cultures led to identification of a powerful strain of the organism, which enabled the development of an effective vaccine.

The Michigan Biological Products Division, which was part of the Michigan Health Department, began producing the vaccine for state use in 1938, and then distributed across the United States by 1940. The identification of sheep blood as essential for incubating the bacterial cultures in petri dishes in the laboratory is attributed to Gordon.

== Recognition ==
In 1997, the Grand Rapids Public Library had a display on several prominent Michigan women, including Gordon.

Michigan House of Representatives Resolution No. 115, sponsored by Representative Lynne Martinez recognized the work of Gordon.

Gordon was inducted into the Michigan Women's Hall of Fame in 2000.

In 2019, the city of Grand Rapids unveiled a statue of Gordon, Eldering and Kendrick at the Michigan State University Research Center. The statue is titled "Adulation: The Future of Science" and was created by Jay Hall Carpenter.

== Personal life and death ==
Gordon worked for the Michigan Department of Health beginning in around 1956 and retiring in 1978.

After World War II, Gordon was selected to travel to Europe and the Middle East with the National Council of Christian and Jews to "take the pulse of the people" in the area. She was a member of Pilgrim's Rest Baptist Church.

Loney Clinton married Howard Gordon on June 23, 1956. The couple lived in Lansing, Michigan, where Gordon worked at the Michigan Department of Health from 1956 to 1978. She died in 1999.
