= North Mock Street Historic District =

Historic district in Arkansas, United States

- U.S. National Register of Historic Places
- U.S. Historic district
- Location within Arkansas Location within the United States
- Location: 112-116 N Mock St., Prairie Grove, Arkansas
- Coordinates: 35°58′34″N 94°19′2″W
- Area: Less than one acre
- NRHP reference No.: 100002566
- Added to NRHP: June 22, 2018

The North Mock Street Historic District encompasses a pair of commercial industrial buildings at 112 and 116 North Mock Street in Prairie Grove, Arkansas.

The B.F. Carl Building, at 116 North Mock, was built in 1904, and originally served as a furniture and casket maker's store. The B.H. Harrison Masonic Temple, at 112 North Mock, was built in 1903, and has served as the home to the local Masonic lodge since. The two buildings are well-preserved examples of early 20th-century commercial architecture, featuring pressed metal storefronts with Classical features.

The district was listed on the National Register of Historic Places in 2018.

== See also ==
- National Register of Historic Places listings in Washington County, Arkansas
