= Prairie Grove School District =

School district in Arkansas

Prairie Grove School District is a public school district in Prairie Grove, Arkansas, United States. The school district provides comprehensive education to residents of Prairie Grove, a portion of Farmington, and nearby unincorporated communities of Washington County, Arkansas.

== History ==
In 2012, Prairie Grove School District and its high school were recognized in the AP District of the Year Awards program in the College Board's 3rd Annual Honor Roll that consisted of 539 U.S. public school districts (6 in Arkansas) that simultaneously achieved increases in access to AP® courses for a broader number of students and improved the rate at which their AP students earned scores of 3 or higher on an AP Exam.

In 2013, Prairie Grove School District was one of four Arkansas school districts recognized in the 4th Annual AP District Honor Roll as being honored for increasing access to AP course work while simultaneously maintaining or increasing the percentage of students earning scores of 3 or higher on Advanced Placement (AP) Exams from 2011 to 2013.

From 2016 to 2022 the enrollment increased, going to 2,072 from 1,916. The net increase from 2021 to 2022 was 40.

== Schools ==
- Prairie Grove High School (9–12)
- Prairie Grove Junior High School (6-8)
  - In 2022 it had 321 students.
- Prairie Grove Internediate School (3–5)
  - In 2022 it had 510 students.
- Prairie Grove Primary School (K–2)
  - In 2022 it had 670 students.
