= Farmington High School (Arkansas) =

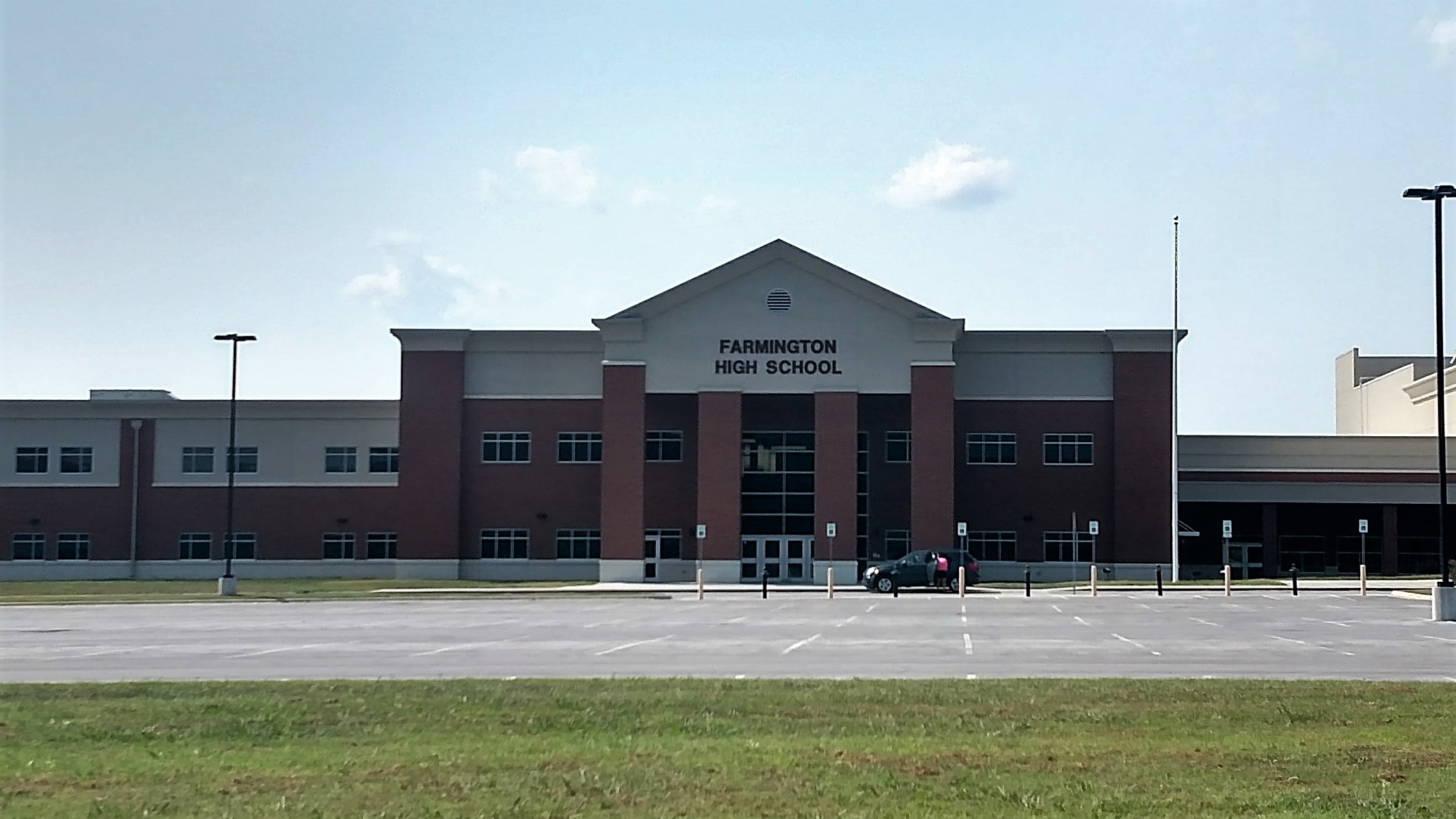

Location
- 12327 N Hwy 170; Farmington, Arkansas 72730; United States
- Coordinates: 36°1′35″N 94°14′48″W

Information
- School type: Public comprehensive
- Motto: Our Students are worth it!
- Status: Open
- School district: Farmington School District
- CEEB code: 040760
- NCES School ID: 050609001716
- Teaching staff: 81.63 (on FTE basis)
- Grades: 10–12
- Enrollment: 679 (2023–2024)
  - Grade 10: 244
  - Grade 11: 226
  - Grade 12: 209
- Student to teacher ratio: 8.32
- Education system: ADE Smart Core
- Classes offered: Regular, Advanced Placement (AP)
- Campus type: Suburban
- Colors: Scarlet and white
- Slogan: It's Still Our Highway
- Athletics conference: 5A West
- Mascot: Cardinal
- Team name: Farmington Cardinals
- Rival: Prairie Grove Tigers
- Accreditation: ADE; AdvancED (1993–)
- Yearbook: Cardinal
- Feeder schools: Randall G. Lynch Middle School (4–6) Farmington Jr. High School (7–9)
- Website: highschool.farmcards.org/o/fhs

Farmington High School is a comprehensive public high school located in the town of Farmington, Arkansas, United States. The school provides secondary education for students in grades 10 through 12. It is one of nine public high schools in Washington County, Arkansas and the sole high school administered by the Farmington School District.

The high school's boundary includes the majority of Farmington and sections of Fayetteville.

In 1924, a high school of brick construction was erected and served nearly 100 students after the district was consolidated. In the 1960s, this building was destroyed in a fire, but replaced by other facilities. The school district launched a massive project in 2014 that resulted in a new performing arts center, high school, football stadium and track field.

== Academics ==
Farmington High School is accredited by the Arkansas Department of Education (ADE) and has been accredited by AdvancED since 1997. The assumed course of study follows the Smart Core curriculum developed by the ADE, which requires students complete at least 22 units prior to graduation. Students complete regular coursework and exams and may take Advanced Placement (AP) courses and exam with the opportunity to receive college credit.

== Athletics ==
The Farmington High School mascot and athletic emblem is the cardinal with red and white serving as the school colors.

The Farmington Cardinals compete in interscholastic activities within the 5A classification in the 5A West conference, as administered by the Arkansas Activities Association. The Cardinals field teams in football, golf (boys/girls), tennis (boys/girls), basketball (boys/girls), baseball, softball, track and field (boys/girls), and cheer.

Between 1972 and 1974, the Farmington Cardinals football team remained undefeated with 34-0-0 record. The fastpitch softball team has won three state championships between 2000 and 2011. In 2020, the girls basketball team won the state championship title shared with Star City due to the COVID-19 pandemic.

In 2023, the girls basketball team won the Class 4A state championship again and repeated as champions in 2024. The boys basketball team made its first state championship game appearance in 2024, led by Layne Taylor, the son of head coach Johnny Taylor. Taylor scored over 3,000 points in his prep career, and is currently third all-time in the record books.

Farmington made it all the way to the 5A state championship game in football in 2024 under long-time Arkansas head coach Tommy Tice, who came out of retirement to lead the Cardinals. They eventually lost to Parkview in the title matchup.

During the first year in 5A in basketball, the girls basketball team won the championship, 54-44 over Greene County Tech. They have been in the state championship game six years in a row under the leadership of coach Brad Johnson.
