= Emily Hartshorne Mudd =

- Born: September 6, 1898
- Died: May 2, 1998 (aged 99)
- Education: University of Pennsylvania
- Occupations: Professor, Birth Control Advocate
- Honours: Elected to the American Philosophical Society in 1993.

Emily Borie Hartshorne Mudd (September 6, 1898 – May 2, 1998), was an early family expert, women's rights activist and birth control advocate. According to The New York Times, she "...helped lay the groundwork for virtually every aspect of professional marriage and family counseling."

== Education ==
Emily Mudd attended Vassar. She earned a master's degree from the University of Pennsylvania School of Social Work (1936) as well as a doctorate in Sociology (1950).

== Career ==
In 1927, Mudd founded Philadelphia's first birth control clinic. She knew of a Philadelphia law that barred pregnant women from being imprisoned, a pregnant Mudd worked to create this clinic. She published an article about early family planning in the February 1931 edition of the Birth Control Review. She was also heavily involved in the creation of the Planned Parenthood Association of Philadelphia. In 1933 Mudd and her husband, a microbiologist and professor at the University of Pennsylvania, helped create the Philadelphia Marriage Council. She served as its executive director from 1936 to her retirement in 1967. In addition to her counseling work, Mudd was also a consulting editor on Alfred Kinsey's report on the sexual behavior of the human female. She and her husband co-authored 14 papers.

Mudd was awarded the Lucretia Mott Award of Women's Way in 1983 and the Pennsylvania ACLU's Seventh Annual Civil Liberties Award in 1989.

Mudd was appointed in 1952 to an assistant professorship of family study in psychiatry, becoming the third woman on the medical school's faculty. In 1956, she became the first woman appointed a full professor at the University of Pennsylvania's medical school.

== Personal life ==
She married University of Pennsylvania professor Dr. Stuart Mudd in 1922. They remained married for fifty years until he died in 1975. The couple had two sons and two daughters. Mudd was voted mother of the year by The Philadelphia Inquirer in 1961. She later remarried. She lived to the age of 99 and had ten grandchildren.
