= Hypotonic-hyporesponsive episode =

Hypotonic-hyporesponsive episode (HHE)
- Symptoms: Hypotonia, hyporesponsiveness, pallor, cyanosis.
- Usual onset: 1 minute to 48 hours post-vaccination.
- Duration: 1 minute to 14 days (median 10 hours).
- Causes: Vaccination, most commonly pertussis vaccine.
- Diagnostic method: Based on symptoms.
- Differential diagnosis: Vasovagal syncope, seizure
- Prevention: Those who experience an HHE after pertussis vaccination may avoid further pertussis vaccines.
- Treatment: Usually resolves on its own, management involves checking the airway, breathing, and circulation, and hospitalization for observation and to rule out other conditions.
- Deaths: None reported

A hypotonic-hyporesponsive episode (HHE) is defined as sudden onset of poor muscle tone, reduced consciousness, and pale or bluish skin occurring within 48 hours after vaccination, most commonly pertussis vaccination. An HHE is estimated to occur after 1 in 4,762 to 1 in 1,408 doses of whole cell pertussis vaccine, and after 1 in 14,286 to 1 in 2,778 doses of acellular pertussis vaccine.
