= Farmington School District =

School district in Arkansas

Location
- 42 South Double Springs Road; Farmington, Arkansas 72730 United States

District information
- Grades: K–12
- Accreditation: ADE; AdvancED
- Schools: 5
- NCES District ID: 0506090

Students and staff
- Students: 2,177
- Teachers: 162.69 (on FTE basis)
- Student–teacher ratio: 13.38
- Colors: Scarlet White

Other information
- Website: farmcards.org

Farmington School District is a public school district based in Farmington, Arkansas, United States. The Farmington School District provides early childhood, elementary and secondary education for more than 2,100 kindergarten through grade 12 students at its five facilities.

Farmington School District and all of its schools are accredited by the Arkansas Department of Education (ADE) and AdvancED.

The district includes the majority of Farmington as well as sections of Fayetteville.

== Schools ==
=== Secondary education ===
The Farmington School District was one of four Arkansas school districts recognized in the 4th Annual AP District Honor Roll as being honored for increasing access to AP course work while simultaneously maintaining or increasing the percentage of students earning scores of 3 or higher on Advanced Placement (AP) Exams from 2011 to 2013.

- Farmington High School—grades 10 through 12.
- Farmington Junior High School - grades 7 through 9.

=== Elementary and early childhood education ===
- Randall G. Lynch Middle School—grades 4 through 6.
- Bob Folsom Elementary School—kindergarten through grade 3.
- Jerry "Pop" Williams Elementary School—kindergarten through grade 3.
