= Stuart Mudd =

American microbiologist (1893–1975)

Stuart Mudd (September 23, 1893, St. Louis, Missouri – March 6, 1975, Haverford, Pennsylvania) was an American physician and professor of microbiology. In 1945 he was the president of the American Society for Microbiology.

== Early life ==
His father was the surgeon Harvey Gilmer Mudd (1857–1933). Stuart Mudd graduated in 1916 with a B.S. in biology from Princeton University and in 1918 with an A.M. from Washington University in St. Louis. At Harvard Medical School he graduated with an M.D. in 1920 and held a research fellowship in biophysics from 1920 to 1923.

== Career ==
He was from 1923 to 1925 an associate at the Rockefeller Institute for Medical Research. At the University of Pennsylvania (UPenn), he was from 1925 to 1931 an associate in pathology at UPenn's Henry Phipps Institute, as well as an associate and assistant professor of experimental pathology at the University of Pennsylvania Medical School (UPenn Medical School, now named the Perelman School of Medicine at the University of Pennsylvania). In the microbiology department of the UPenn Medical School, he was an associate professor from 1931 to 1934 and a full professor from 1934 to 1959, when he retired as professor emeritus. From 1931 to 1959 he was the head of the department of microbiology. At the Veterans Administration Hospital in Philadelphia, he was from 1959 to 1975 the chief of the microbiological research program.

Mudd did research on a wide variety of topics, including phagocytosis, hemolytic streptococci, bacterial filtration, and electron microscopy of bacteria. During WW II, he worked on a method for freeze-drying of blood plasma, promoting an effective treatment for blood loss in wounded soldiers. He was the author or co-author of more than 275 scientific publications.

In 1952 he was the president of the Histochemical Society. From 1958 to 1962 he was the president of the International Association of Microbiological Societies. He was a founder and vice-president of the World Academy of Art and Science

In 1925 he was elected a Fellow of the American Association for the Advancement of Science. In 1944 his name was engraved on the Guggenheim Honor Cup of the Penn Club of New York. From 1976 to 1995 the Eastern Pennsylvania Branch of the American Society of Microbiology sponsored an annual Stuart Mudd Memorial Lecture.

== Personal life ==
In 1922 he married Emily Borie Hartshorne, who became in 1956 the first woman appointed to a full professorship at the UPenn Medical School. Upon his death in 1975, he was survived by his widow, two sons, two daughters, and six grandchildren.

Stuart Mudd, M.D. (1893–1975) should not be confused with his son, Stuart Harvey Mudd, M.D. (1927–2014), who was called S. Harvey Mudd and was noteworthy for his research on metabolic disorders.

== Selected publications ==
=== Articles ===
- Mudd, Stuart; Mudd, Emily B. H. (1924). "The Penetration of Bacteria Through Capillary Spaces". Journal of Experimental Medicine. 40 (5): 633–645. doi:10.1084/jem.40.5.633. PMC 2128612. PMID 19868947.
- Flosdorf, Earl W.; Mudd, Stuart (November 1935). "Procedure and Apparatus for Preservation in "Lyophile" form of Serum and Other Biological Substances". The Journal of Immunology. 29 (5): 389–425. doi:10.4049/jimmunol.29.5.389. S2CID 82053475.
- Flosdorf, Earl W.; Mudd, Stuart (June 1, 1938). "An Improved Procedure and Apparatus for Preservation of Sera, Microörganisms and Other Substances—The Cryochem-Process". Journal of Immunology. 34 (6): 469–490. doi:10.4049/jimmunol.34.6.469. S2CID 83781876.
- Mudd, Stuart; Polevitzky, Katherine; Anderson, Thomas F.; Chambers, Leslie A. (1941). "Bacterial Morphology as Shown by the Electron Microscope". Journal of Bacteriology. 42 (2): 251–264. doi:10.1128/jb.42.2.251-264.1941. PMC 374756. PMID 16560452.
- Mudd, Stuart; Polevitzky, Katherine; Anderson, Thomas F. (1943). "Bacterial Morphology as shown by the Electron Microscope". Journal of Bacteriology. 46 (1): 15–24. doi:10.1128/jb.46.1.15-24.1943. PMC 373786. PMID 16560674.
- Mudd, Stuart; Winterscheid, Loren C.; Delamater, Edward D.; Henderson, Howard J. (1951). "Evidence Suggesting That the Granules of Mycobacteria Are Mitochondria". Journal of Bacteriology. 62 (4): 459–475. doi:10.1128/jb.62.4.459-475.1951. PMC 386152. PMID 14897817.
- Mudd, Stuart; Yoshida, Akira; Koike, Masaatsu (1958). "Polyphosphate as Accumulator of Phosphorus and Energy". Journal of Bacteriology. 75 (2): 224–235. doi:10.1128/jb.75.2.224-235.1958. PMC 290061. PMID 13513586.

=== Books ===
- Mudd, Stuart; Thalhimer, William, eds. (1942). Blood Substitutes and Blood Transfusion. Springfield: Charles C. Thomas. OCLC 2927115.
- Mudd, Stuart, ed. (1964). The Population Crisis and the Use of World Resources. World Academy of Art and Science book series. Vol. 2. The Hague: W. Junk. doi:10.1007/978-94-017-5910-6. ISBN 978-94-017-5645-7. OCLC 643478.
- Mudd, Stuart, ed. (1966). Conflict Resolution and World Education. World Academy of Art and Science book series. Vol. 3. The Hague: W. Junk. doi:10.1007/978-94-017-6269-4. ISBN 978-94-017-5823-9. OCLC 1093044.
- Mudd, Stuart, ed. (1969). Infectious Agents and Host Reactions. Philadelphia: W. B. Saunders. ISBN 0721665756. OCLC 51024.
