= Farmington, Arkansas =

- City
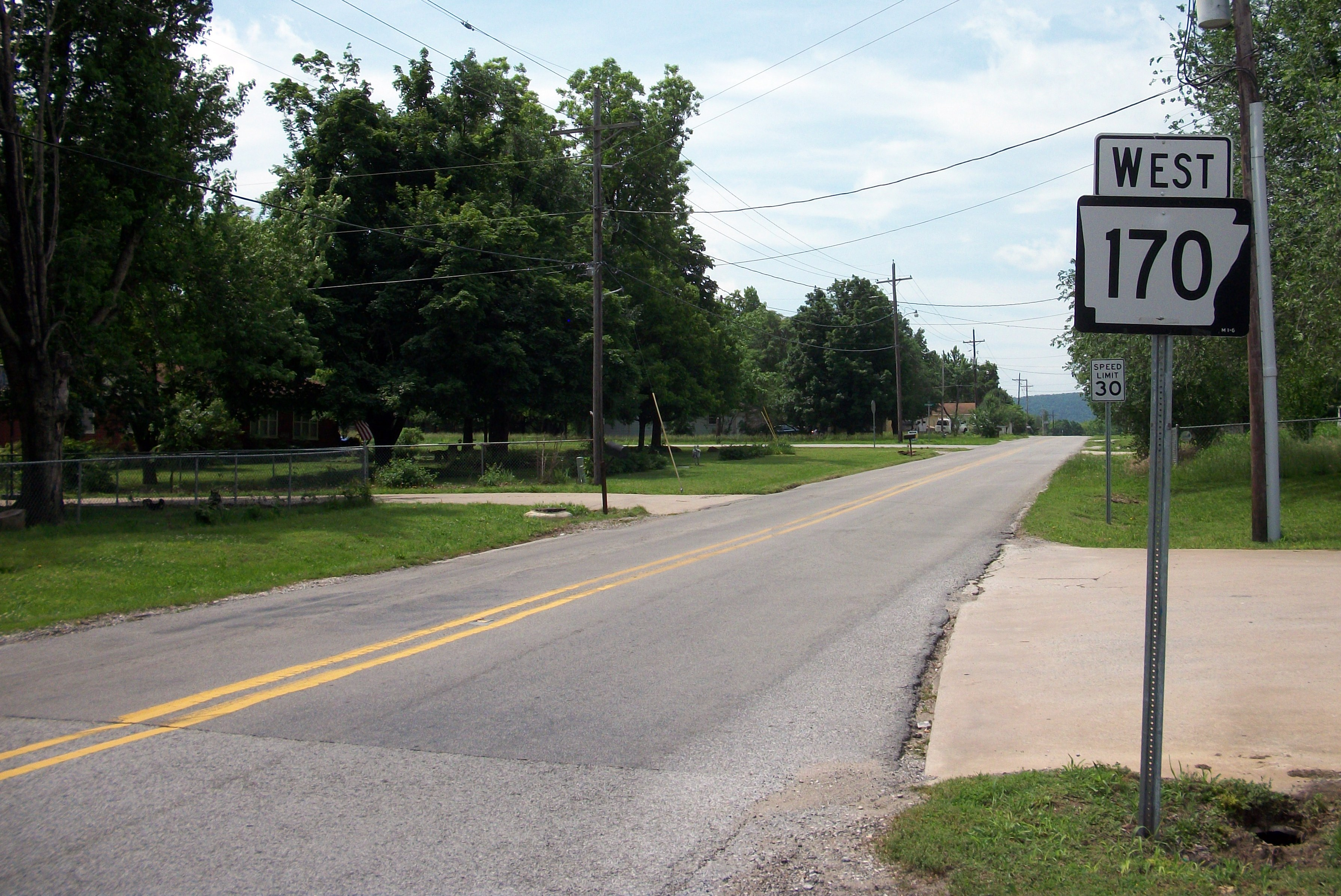
- Looking south along Highway 170
- Motto: "Feels Like Home"
- Location of Farmington in Washington County, Arkansas.
- Coordinates: 36°02′07″N 94°14′18″W
- Country: United States
- State: Arkansas
- County: Washington
- Settled: 1828
- Incorporated: October 15, 1946

Government

Area
  - City: 9.88 sq mi (25.58 km^{2})
  - Land: 9.83 sq mi (25.45 km^{2})
  - Water: 0.050 sq mi (0.13 km^{2})
- Elevation: 1,217 ft (371 m)

Population (2020)
  - City: 7,584
  - Estimate (2025): 10,658 ▲
  - Density: 771.8/sq mi (297.99/km^{2})
  - Metro: 463,402
- Time zone: UTC-6 (Central (CST))
  - Summer (DST): UTC-5 (CDT)
- ZIP code: 72730
- Area code: 479
- FIPS code: 05-23170
- GNIS feature ID: 2403598
- Website: City of Farmington Arkansas

Farmington is a city in Washington County, Arkansas, United States. As of the 2020 census, Farmington had a population of 7,584. The community is nestled in a valley among the Boston Mountains, a subset of the Ozark Mountains. Although the first settlers came from the Deep South in 1828, the community did not incorporate until 1946. Located immediately west of Fayetteville in the Northwest Arkansas metropolitan statistical area, Farmington has been experiencing a population boom in recent years, as indicated by a 66% growth in population between the 2000 and 2010 censuses. It has been characterized as a bedroom community by the University of Arkansas Community Design Center.

== History ==
=== Settlement through Civil War ===
The first settlers came from the Deep South in 1828, and the area was known as Engel's Mill until a post office was built in 1868 and the village was renamed. The Civil War had a great impact on the community, as the area were mainly Confederates. The Battle of Prairie Grove occurred not far from Farmington, and the city was subject to raids by both armies as well as unaffiliated guerrillas and roughnecks.

The city was platted ca. 1870.

=== Reconstruction through present ===
Around the 1890s, residents found prosperity by growing strawberries and grapes and shipping them on the St. Louis–San Francisco Railway. The tracks were pulled up during World War II. Farmington was incorporated on October 15, 1946.

== Geography ==
According to the United States Census Bureau, the city has a total area of 4.8 square miles (12 km^{2}), all land. Farmington is located close to the Ozark mountains.

== Demographics ==
Historical population
Census	Pop.	Note	%±
1960	216		—
1970	908		320.4%
1980	1,283		41.3%
1990	1,322		3.0%
2000	3,605		172.7%
2010	5,974		65.7%
2020	7,584		27.0%
2025 (est.)	10,658	▲	40.5%
U.S. Decennial Census; 2015 Estimate

=== 2020 census ===
As of the 2020 census, Farmington had a population of 7,584. The median age was 35.5 years. 26.2% of residents were under the age of 18 and 13.4% of residents were 65 years of age or older. For every 100 females there were 90.7 males, and for every 100 females age 18 and over there were 89.1 males age 18 and over.

82.4% of residents lived in urban areas, while 17.6% lived in rural areas.

There were 2,853 households, including 1,908 families, in Farmington. Of all households, 37.3% had children under the age of 18 living in them, 52.9% were married-couple households, 13.9% were households with a male householder and no spouse or partner present, and 25.2% were households with a female householder and no spouse or partner present. About 22.8% of all households were made up of individuals, and 9.2% had someone living alone who was 65 years of age or older.

There were 3,006 housing units, of which 5.1% were vacant. The homeowner vacancy rate was 2.1% and the rental vacancy rate was 5.6%.

Farmington racial composition
Race	Number	Percentage
White (non-Hispanic)	6,045	79.71%
Black or African American (non-Hispanic)	198	2.61%
Native American	111	1.46%
Asian	73	0.96%
Pacific Islander	19	0.25%
Other/Mixed	603	7.95%
Hispanic or Latino	535	7.05%

=== 2000 census ===
As of the census of 2000, there were 3,605 people, 1,337 households, and 1,013 families residing in the city. The population density was 750.6 inhabitants per square mile (289.8/km^{2}). There were 1,390 housing units at an average density of 289.4 per square mile (111.7/km^{2}). The racial makeup of the city was 94.01% White, 0.64% Black or African American, 1.75% Native American, 0.25% Asian, 0.94% from other races, and 2.41% from two or more races. 2.19% of the population were Hispanic or Latino of any race.

There were 1,337 households, out of which 43.6% had children under the age of 18 living with them, 58.8% were married couples living together, 14.1% had a female householder with no husband present, and 24.2% were non-families. 19.1% of all households were made up of individuals, and 7.4% had someone living alone who was 65 years of age or older. The average household size was 2.70 and the average family size was 3.09.

In the city, the population was spread out, with 30.7% under the age of 18, 10.3% from 18 to 24, 34.5% from 25 to 44, 16.1% from 45 to 64, and 8.4% who were 65 years of age or older. The median age was 30 years. For every 100 females, there were 93.8 males. For every 100 females age 18 and over, there were 85.3 males.

The median income for a household in the city was $38,969, and the median income for a family was $43,472. Males had a median income of $30,317 versus $21,250 for females. The per capita income for the city was $15,387. About 5.2% of families and 7.5% of the population were below the poverty line, including 7.3% of those under age 18 and 12.1% of those age 65 or over.

== Economy ==
Farmington borders Fayetteville to the west and sections of Fayetteville along Highway 16 are north of the city.

== Culture, contemporary life, and points of interest ==
=== Annual cultural events ===
Farmington hosts annual events throughout the year.

- FreedomFest celebrates the Independence Day holiday with food and drink, music, children's entertainment, and fireworks.
- Back to School Bonanza is hosted by the Farmington United Methodist Church and provided dental screenings, clothing, food, and school supplies for students in preparation for the school year.
- Farmington Fall Festival is held in Creekside Park and includes live music, pony rides, vendors, and an art show.
- Farmington Christmas Parade happens every year towards the beginning of December. It includes the Farmington Crimson Regiment Marching Band currently directed by Jim Spillars, among other Christmas-related floats.
- The Farmington Cardinals football team faces the Prairie Grove Tigers every year at the beginning of the football season, despite being in different conferences for the sake of time-honored rivalry. This event often draws hundreds of people from both towns and is popularly referred to as Battle of '62, after highway 62 connecting both towns.

== Education ==
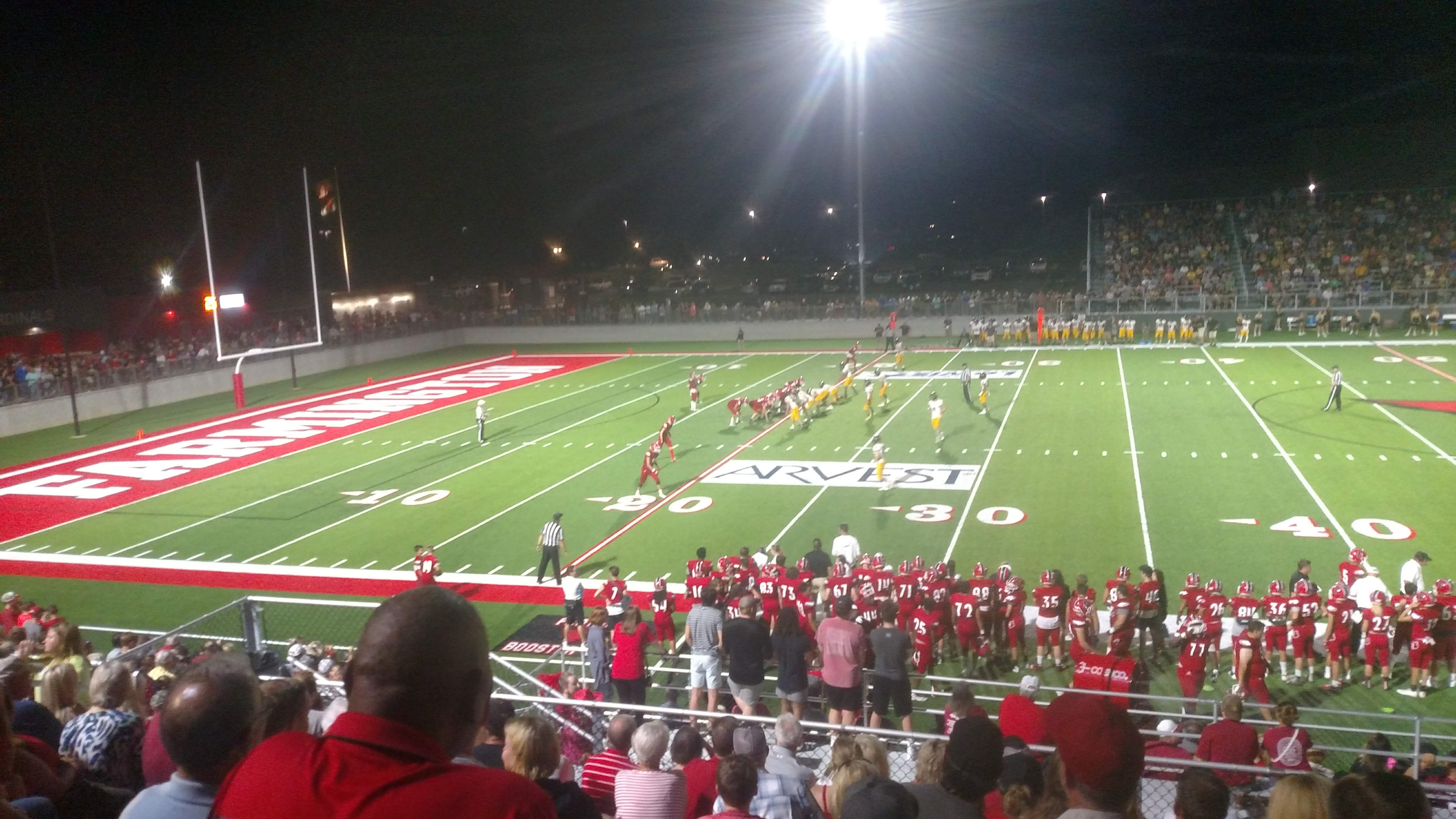
Farmington High School takes on Prairie Grove in the annual "Battle for 62" rivalry game, the first home game played in Cardinals Stadium

Farmington School District provides elementary and secondary to students in most areas. Farmington's comprehensive high school is Farmington Career Academies, more popularly referred to as Farmington High School. The mascot is the cardinal and their team colors are scarlet red and white.

A portion of Farmington is in the Prairie Grove School District and another portion is in the Fayetteville Public Schools. Prairie Grove High School and Fayetteville High School are these districts' respective comprehensive high schools.

Farmington has two elementary schools, one intermediate (4/5th grade), one middle school (6/7th grade), one Junior High (8/9th), and one High School (Sophomore-Senior). Farmington High School moved into a new building in 2017, including a new Football Field and renovations on old school buildings.

== Transportation ==
As of 2023, there is no fixed route transit service in Farmington. Ozark Regional Transit operates demand-response service in the city. The nearest intercity bus service is provided by Jefferson Lines in nearby Fayetteville.

== Notable people ==
- Sarah Colonna, American comedian, actress, best-selling author known for her work and appearances on E!’s Chelsea Lately

== See also ==
- Farmington Township, Washington County, Arkansas
- Walnut Grove, Washington County, Arkansas, unincorporated community located south of Farmington on Highway 170
