= Pertussis vaccine =

Vaccine protecting against whooping cough

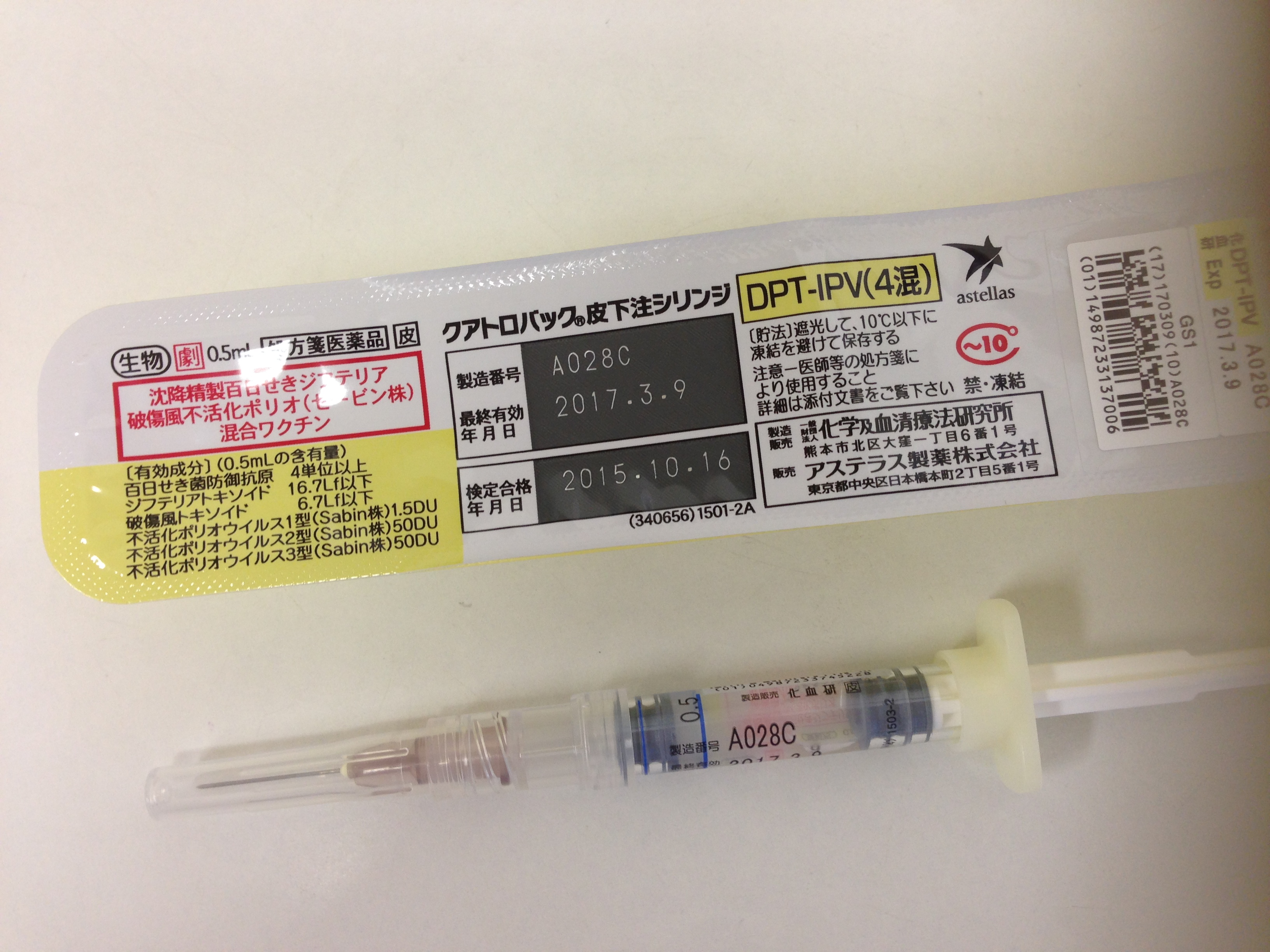
- Pertussis vaccination is often administered via a combined DPT vaccine or, as shown here, a DTaP-IPV vaccine

Vaccine description
- Target: Whooping cough
- Vaccine type: Inactivated, subunit

Clinical data
- MedlinePlus: a682198
- License data: US DailyMed: Pertussis vaccine
- ATC code: J07AJ01 (WHO) J07AJ02 (WHO) J07AJ51 (WHO) J07AJ52 (WHO)

Legal status
- Legal status: US: ℞-only; In general: ℞ (Prescription only)

Identifiers
- DrugBank: DB15274
- ChemSpider: none
- UNII: 2QNL82089R

Pertussis vaccine is a vaccine that protects against whooping cough (pertussis). There are two main types: whole-cell vaccines and acellular vaccines. The whole-cell vaccine is about 78% effective while the acellular vaccine is 71–85% effective. The effectiveness of the vaccines appears to decrease by between 2 and 10% per year after vaccination, with a more rapid decrease with the acellular vaccines. The vaccine is only available in combination with tetanus and diphtheria vaccines (DPT vaccine). Pertussis vaccine is estimated to have saved over 500,000 lives in 2002.

Vaccinating the mother during pregnancy may protect the baby. The World Health Organization and the US Centers for Disease Control and Prevention recommend all children be vaccinated for pertussis and that it be included in routine vaccinations. Three doses starting at six weeks of age are typically recommended in young children. Additional doses may be given to older children and adults. This recommendation includes people who have HIV/AIDS.

The acellular vaccines are more commonly used in the developed world due to fewer adverse effects. Between 10 and 50% of people given the whole-cell vaccines develop redness at the injection site or fever. Febrile seizures and long periods of crying occur in less than 1% of people. With the acellular vaccines, a brief period of non-serious swelling of the arm may occur. Side effects with both types of vaccines, but especially the whole-cell vaccine, are less common in younger children. The whole-cell vaccines should not be used after seven years of age. Serious long-term neurological problems are not associated with either type.

The pertussis vaccine was developed in 1926. It is on the World Health Organization's List of Essential Medicines.

== Medical uses ==
=== Effectiveness ===
Acellular pertussis vaccine (aP) with three or more antigens prevents around 85% of typical whooping cough cases in children. Compared to the whole cell pertussis vaccine (wP) used previously, the efficacy of aP declines faster. Multi-antigen aP has higher efficacy than old low-efficacy wP, but is possibly less effective than the highest-efficacy wP vaccines. Acellular vaccines also cause fewer side effects than whole-cell vaccines.

Despite widespread vaccination, pertussis has persisted in vaccinated populations and is one of the most common vaccine-preventable diseases. The recent resurgence in pertussis infections is attributed to a combination of waning immunity and new mutations in the pathogen that existing vaccines are unable to control effectively. It is debated whether the switch from wP to aP has played a role in this resurgence, with two 2019 articles disagreeing with one another.

Some studies have suggested that while acellular pertussis vaccines are effective at preventing the disease, they have a limited impact on infection and transmission, meaning that vaccinated people could spread the disease even though they may have only mild symptoms or none at all.

=== Children ===
For children, immunizations are commonly given in combination with immunizations against tetanus, diphtheria, polio, and haemophilus influenzae type B at two, four, six, and 15–18 months of age.

=== Adults ===
In 2006, the US Centers for Disease Control and Prevention (CDC) recommended that adults receive pertussis vaccination along with the tetanus and diphtheria toxoid booster. In 2011, they began recommending boosters during each pregnancy. The UK commenced routine vaccination of pregnant women in 2012. The program initially aimed to vaccinate women between 28 and 32 weeks (but up to 38 weeks) of pregnancy: later advise allowed maternal pertussis immunisation from week 16 of pregnancy. Since its introduction, the maternal pertussis immunisation programme has been very effective in protecting infants until they can have their first vaccinations at two months of age. During the first year of the maternal immunization programme in Britain, the average vaccine coverage in England was 64%, and vaccine effectiveness was estimated to be 91%. During 2012, fourteen infants died from pertussis in England and Wales; all were born before the introduction of the programme. Up to 31 October 2014, 10 deaths were reported in infants with confirmed whooping cough who were born after the introduction of the maternal programme. Nine of them were born to unvaccinated mothers, and all 10 were too young to have received a dose of pertussis-containing vaccine.

The pertussis booster for adults is combined with a tetanus vaccine and diphtheria vaccine booster; this combination is abbreviated "Tdap" (Tetanus, diphtheria, acellular pertussis). It is similar to the childhood vaccine called "DTaP" (Diphtheria, Tetanus, acellular Pertussis), with the main difference that the adult version contains smaller amounts of diphtheria and pertussis components—this is indicated in the name by the use of lower-case "d" and "p" for the adult vaccine. The lowercase "a" in each vaccine indicates that the pertussis component is acellular, or cell-free, which reduces the incidence of side effects. The pertussis component of the original DPT vaccine accounted for most of the minor local and systemic side effects in many vaccinated infants (such as mild fever or soreness at the injection site). The newer acellular vaccine, known as DTaP, has greatly reduced the incidence of adverse effects compared to the earlier "whole-cell" pertussis vaccine; however, immunity wanes faster after the acellular vaccine than the whole-cell vaccine.

== Side effects ==
Between 10% and 50% of people given the whole-cell vaccines develop redness, swelling, soreness or tenderness at the injection site and/or fever, less than 1% experience febrile seizures or long periods of crying, and less than 1 out of every 1,000 to 2,000 people vaccinated have a hypotonic-hyporesponsive episode. The same reactions may occur after acellular vaccines, but are less common. Side effects with both types of vaccines, but especially the whole-cell vaccine, are more likely the older the child. The whole-cell vaccines should not be used after seven years of age. According to the WHO, serious long-term neurological problems are not associated with either type. The WHO says that the only contraindication to either whole cell or acellular pertussis vaccines is an anaphylactic reaction to a previous dose of pertussis vaccine, while the US Centers for Disease Control and Prevention (CDC) lists encephalopathy not due to another identifiable cause occurring within seven days after a previous dose of pertussis vaccine as a contraindication and recommends those who have had seizures, have a known or suspected neurological disorder or have had a neurologic event after a previous dose not be vaccinated until after treatment is initiated and the condition stabilized. Only the acellular vaccine is used in the US.

== Modern formulations ==
Whole-cell pertussis vaccines contain the entire inactivated organism while acellular pertussis vaccines contain parts (subunits) including the pertussis toxin alone or with components such as filamentous haemagglutinin, fimbrial antigens and pertactin. Whole-cell (wP) remains the vaccine of choice in low and middle-income countries, as it is cheaper and easier to produce.

As of 2018, there are four acellular DTaP/Tdap vaccines licensed for use in the United States: Infanrix and Daptacel for children, Boostrix and Adacel for adolescents and adults. As of April 2016, the United Kingdom authorized five multivalent vaccines that include pertussis components: Pediacel, Infanrix-IPV+Hib, Repevax, Infanrix-IPV, and Boostrix-IPV.

Composition of the pertussis component of selected vaccines
| Vaccine | Producer | Licensed for | Pertussis toxin (PT), μg | Filamentous hemagglutinin (FHA), μg | Pertactin (PRN), μg | Fimbriae (FIM), μg |
|---|---|---|---|---|---|---|
| Infanrix | GlaxoSmithKline | 6 weeks through 6 years | 25 | 25 | 8 | – |
| Boostrix | GlaxoSmithKline | 10 years and older | 8 | 8 | 2.5 | – |
| Daptacel | Sanofi Pasteur | 6 weeks through 6 years | 10 | 5 | 3 | 5 |
| Adacel | Sanofi Pasteur | 10 through 64 years | 2.5 | 5 | 3 | 5 |
| Pediarix | GlaxoSmithKline | 6 weeks through 6 years | 10 | | | |
| Kinrix | GlaxoSmithKline | | | | | |
| Quadracel | Sanofi Pasteur | | | | | |
| Vaxelis | MSP Vaccine Company | 6 weeks through 4 years | | | | |
| Pentacel | Sanofi Pasteur | 6 weeks through 4 years | | | | |
| Pediacel | Sanofi Pasteur | 6 weeks to 4 years | 20 | 20 | 3 | 5 |
| Infanrix-IPV+Hib | GlaxoSmithKline | from 2 months | 25 | 25 | 8 | - |
| Repevax | Sanofi Pasteur | from 3 years | 2.5 | 5 | 3 | 5 |
| Infanrix-IPV | GlaxoSmithKline | 16 months to 13 years | 25 | 25 | 8 | - |
| Boostrix-IPV | GlaxoSmithKline | from 4 years | 8 | 8 | 2.5 | - |
| Vacpertagen | BioNet Europe | from 12 years | .5 | .5 | | |

== History ==
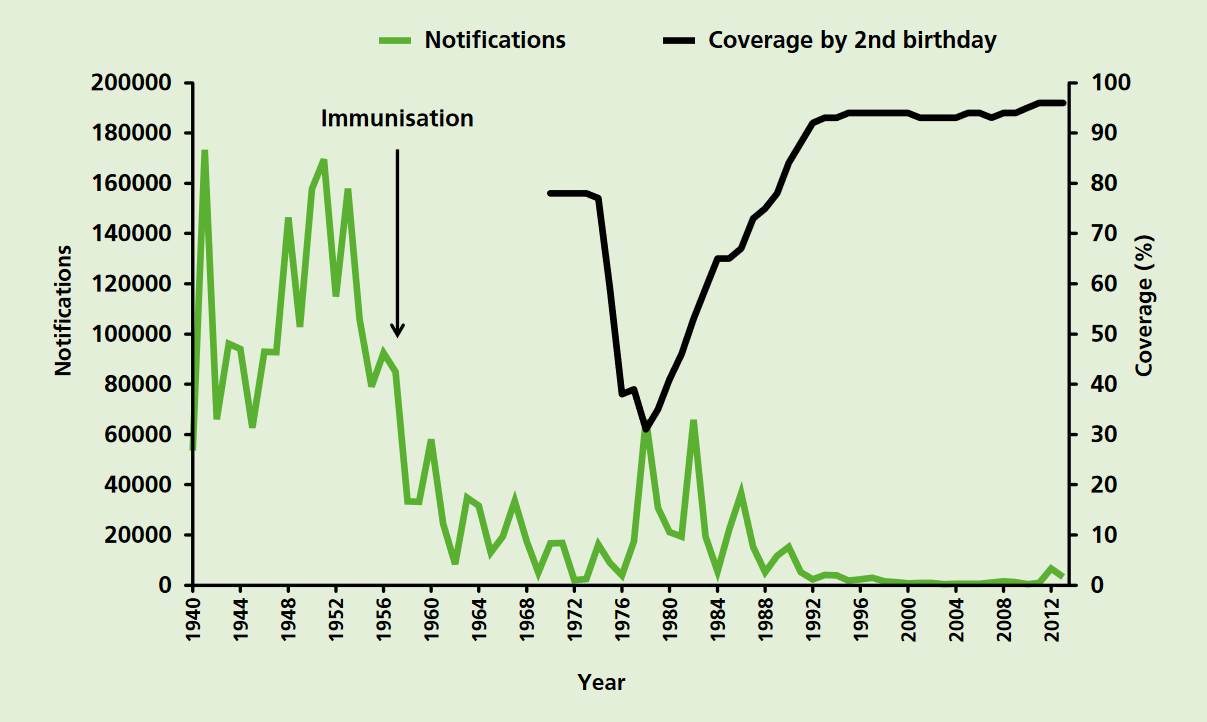
Pertussis notifications (England and Wales) and vaccine coverage (England only) of children by their second birthday (1940–2013)

Pearl Kendrick, Loney Gordon and Grace Eldering studied pertussis in the 1930s. They developed and ran the first large-scale study of a successful vaccine for the disease.

The pertussis vaccine is usually administered as a component of the diphtheria-tetanus-pertussis (DTP/DTwP, DTaP, and Tdap) vaccines. There are several types of diphtheria-tetanus-pertussis vaccines. The first vaccine against pertussis was developed in the 1930s by pediatrician Leila Denmark. It included whole-cell killed Bordetella pertussis bacteria. Until the beginning of the 1990s, it was used as a part of the DTwP vaccine for the immunization of children. It, however, contained pertussis endotoxin (surface lipooligosaccharide) and produced side effects.

New acellular pertussis vaccines were developed in the 1980s, which included only a few selected pertussis antigens (toxins and adhesins). Acellular vaccines are less likely to provoke side effects. They became a part of DTaP vaccines for children. In 2005, two new vaccine products were licensed for use in adolescents and adults that combine the tetanus and diphtheria toxoids with acellular pertussis vaccine. These (Tdap) vaccines contain reduced amounts of pertussis antigens compared to DTaP vaccines.

=== Controversy in the 1970s–1980s ===
During the 1970s and 1980s, a controversy erupted related to the question of whether the whole-cell pertussis component caused permanent brain injury in rare cases, called pertussis vaccine encephalopathy. Despite this allegation, doctors recommended the vaccine due to the overwhelming public health benefit, because the claimed rate was very low (one case per 310,000 immunizations, or about 50 cases out of the 15 million immunizations each year in the United States), and the risk of death from the disease was high (pertussis killed thousands of Americans each year before the vaccine was introduced). No studies showed a causal connection, and later studies showed no connection of any type between the DPT vaccine and permanent brain injury. The alleged vaccine-induced brain damage proved to be an unrelated condition, infantile epilepsy. In 1990, the Journal of the American Medical Association called the connection a "myth" and "nonsense".

However, negative publicity and fearmongering caused the immunization rate to fall in several countries, including the UK, Sweden, and Japan. A dramatic increase in the incidence of pertussis followed. For example, in England and Wales before the introduction of pertussis immunisation in the 1950s, the average annual number of notifications exceeded 120,000. By 1972, when vaccine coverage was around 80%, there were only 2,069 notifications of pertussis. The professional and public anxiety about the safety and efficacy of the whole-cell vaccine caused coverage to fall to about 60% in 1975 and around 30% by 1978. Major epidemics occurred in 1977–79 and 1981–83. In 1978, there were over 65,000 notifications and 12 deaths (see the chart of pertussis notifications). These two major epidemics illustrate the impact of a fall in coverage of an effective vaccine. The actual number of deaths due to these pertussis outbreaks was higher since not all cases in infants are recognised.

In the United States, low-profit margins and an increase in vaccine-related lawsuits led many manufacturers to stop producing the DPT vaccine by the early 1980s. In 1982, the television documentary DPT: Vaccine Roulette by reporter Lea Thompson of Washington, D. C. station WRC-TV depicted the lives of children whose severe disabilities were incorrectly blamed on the DPT vaccine. The ensuing negative publicity led to many lawsuits against vaccine manufacturers. By 1985, vaccine manufacturers had difficulty obtaining liability insurance. The price of the DPT vaccine skyrocketed, leading providers to curtail purchases and limit availability. Only one manufacturer remained in the US by the end of 1985. In response, Congress passed the National Childhood Vaccine Injury Act (NCVIA) in 1986, establishing a federal no-fault system to compensate victims of injury caused by recommended vaccines.

Concerns about side effects led Sato to introduce an even safer acellular vaccine for Japan in 1981, which was approved in the US in 1992, for use in the combination DTaP vaccine. The acellular vaccine has a rate of adverse events similar to that of a Td vaccine (a tetanus-diphtheria vaccine containing no pertussis vaccine).

== See also ==
- Global Pertussis Initiative
