= Prairie Grove, Arkansas =

City in Arkansas

- City
- City of Prairie Grove
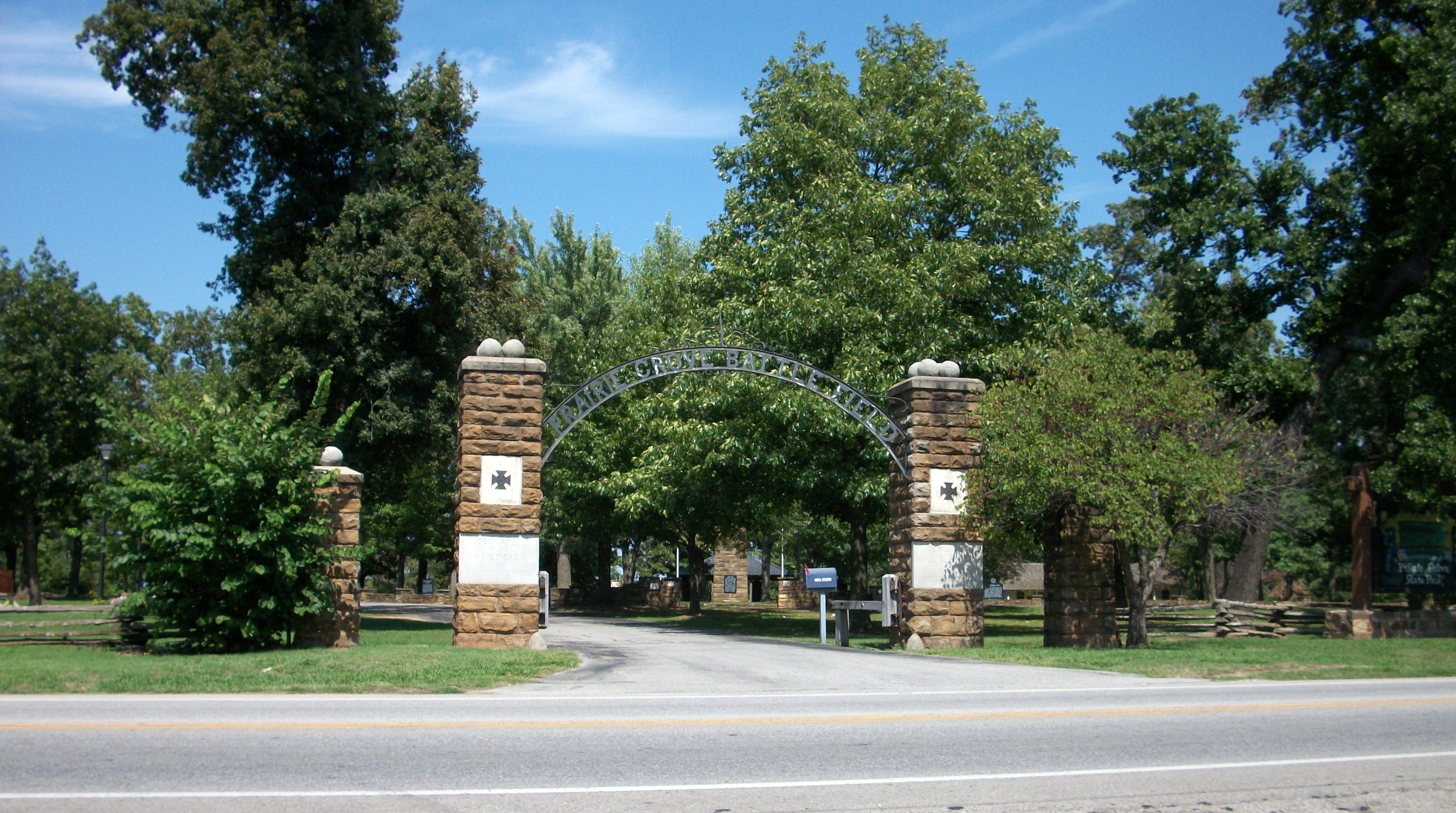
- Main entrance to Prairie Grove Battlefield State Park

- Seal

- Location of Prairie Grove in Washington County, Arkansas.
- Coordinates: 35°59′09″N 94°18′18″W
- Country: United States
- State: Arkansas
- County: Washington
- Incorporated: July 9, 1888

Government
  - Mayor: David Faulk

Area
  - Total: 9.33 sq mi (24.16 km^{2})
  - Land: 9.28 sq mi (24.04 km^{2})
  - Water: 0.046 sq mi (0.12 km^{2})
- Elevation: 1,184 ft (361 m)

Population (2020)
  - Total: 7,045
  - Estimate (2025): 8,998 ▲
  - Density: 759.1/sq mi (293.08/km^{2})
- Time zone: UTC-6 (Central)
  - Summer (DST): UTC-5 (Central)
- ZIP code: 72753
- Area code: 479
- FIPS code: 05-57170
- GNIS feature ID: 2404567
- Website: http://www.prairiegrovearkansas.org/

Prairie Grove is a city in Washington County, Arkansas, United States. The population was 7,045 at the 2020 Census. It is part of the Northwest Arkansas region, and home to Prairie Grove Battlefield State Park.

== History ==
Prairie Grove was the site of the Battle of Prairie Grove during the American Civil War. Confederate forces under General Thomas C. Hindman attempted to prevent the juncture of two Federal forces under Generals James G. Blunt and Francis J. Herron. The result of the battle was a tactical stalemate which assured permanent Union control of northwest Arkansas. The battlefield is now a State Military Park.

A post office has been in operation at Prairie Grove since 1867. Prairie Grove was platted in 1877. A 100-foot wind turbine near Prairie Grove was installed in the early 2000s.

The Natural Resources Defense Council released an issue paper stating between that 1997 and 2001, Prairie Grove was the center of a cluster of testicular cancer cases. No clear cause has been identified but the NRDC notes the town is near a closed nuclear reactor and a low-level radioactive landfill. Arsenic from industrialized chicken manure is another possible source. In 2004, residents sued one of the poultry farms and the poultry feed manufacturer for spreading contaminated manure throughout Prairie Grove. The lawsuit did not assign blame and the cause of the cancer cluster has never been definitively determined.

== Geography ==
According to the United States Census Bureau, the city has a total area of 2.1 square miles (5.4 km^{2}), all land.

== Demographics ==
Historical population
Census	Pop.	Note	%±
1890	412		—
1900	551		33.7%
1910	774		40.5%
1920	861		11.2%
1930	743		−13.7%
1940	887		19.4%
1950	939		5.9%
1960	1,056		12.5%
1970	1,582		49.8%
1980	1,708		8.0%
1990	1,761		3.1%
2000	2,540		44.2%
2010	4,380		72.4%
2020	7,045		60.8%
2025 (est.)	8,998	▲	27.7%
U.S. Decennial Census

=== 2020 census ===
As of the 2020 census, Prairie Grove had a population of 7,045. The median age was 34.9 years. 26.8% of residents were under the age of 18 and 14.8% of residents were 65 years of age or older. For every 100 females there were 93.8 males, and for every 100 females age 18 and over there were 88.8 males age 18 and over.

85.1% of residents lived in urban areas, while 14.9% lived in rural areas.

There were 2,683 households in Prairie Grove, including 1,596 families. Of all households, 37.4% had children under the age of 18 living in them, 54.9% were married-couple households, 13.8% were households with a male householder and no spouse or partner present, and 25.6% were households with a female householder and no spouse or partner present. About 23.4% of all households were made up of individuals and 10.0% had someone living alone who was 65 years of age or older.

There were 2,839 housing units, of which 5.5% were vacant. The homeowner vacancy rate was 1.9% and the rental vacancy rate was 6.0%.

Prairie Grove racial composition
Race	Number	Percentage
White (non-Hispanic)	5,755	81.69%
Black or African American (non-Hispanic)	52	0.74%
Native American	122	1.73%
Asian	76	1.08%
Pacific Islander	5	0.07%
Other/Mixed	580	8.23%
Hispanic or Latino	455	6.46%

=== 2010 census ===
As of the census of 2010, there were 4,380 people, 1,658 households, and 1,197 families residing in the city. The racial makeup of the city was 91.08% White, 0.80% Black or African American, 2.90% Native American, 0.70% Asian, 0.10% Pacific Islander, 1.50% from other races, and 2.10% from two or more races. 4.50% of the population were Hispanic or Latino of any race.

There were 1,658 households, out of which 36.6% had children under the age of 18 living with them, 56.1% were married couples living together, 12.4% had a female householder with no husband present, and 27.8% were non-families. 40.0% of all households were made up of individuals, and 24.5% had someone living alone who was 65 years of age or older. The average household size was 2.64 and the average family size was 3.11.

== Infrastructure ==
=== Transit ===
As of 2023, there is no fixed route transit service in Prairie Grove. Ozark Regional Transit operates demand-response service in the city. The nearest intercity bus service is provided by Jefferson Lines in nearby Fayetteville.

=== Roadways ===
U.S. Route 62

US 62B east – Prairie Grove

US 62B west – Prairie Grove

== Arts and culture ==
The annual Clothesline Fair has taken place in Prairie Grove to celebrate local artists and craftspeople since 1951. An early fair merged with popular Labor Day festivities and annual reunions of the descendants of Confederate soldiers that took place at Prairie Grove Battlefield State Park. A Square dance has been included since 1958, now known as the Peggy Parks Memorial Square Dance Competition.

The two most well known attractions in Prairie Grove are the Prairie Grove Battlefield State Park and the Telephone Booth, a working c. 1960 phonebooth across the street from the park. The city also has several historical buildings including North Mock Street as well as the Southern Mercantile Building.

== Education ==
Prairie Grove School District is separated into four different schools; Prairie Grove Elementary, Middle, Junior High and High School facilities. The school mascot is The Tigers. The school colors are Black, Gold, White, and Gray.

== Notable residents ==
- Jalen Beeks, pitcher for Arkansas Razorbacks baseball from 2013 to 2014, and in Major League Baseball from 2018–present
- Maupin Cummings, judge and politician, served in Arkansas General Assembly from 1935 to 1943
- Mark Martin, Arkansas Secretary of State from 2011 to 2019 and member of the Arkansas House of Representatives for part of Washington County from 2005 to 2011; Prairie Grove resident
- Margaret Pittman, a noted bacteriologist known for her work in helping to formulate and test the effectiveness of the whooping cough vaccine, as well as groundbreaking research into the immunology and microbiology of infectious diseases. She was born near Prairie Grove in 1901.

== See also ==
- List of municipalities in Arkansas
- National Register of Historic Places listings in Washington County, Arkansas
