= Grace Eldering =

American public health scientist

Grace Eldering (September 5, 1900 – August 31, 1988) was an American public health scientist, known for her involvement in the creation of a vaccine for whooping cough along with Loney Gordon and Pearl Kendrick.

== Early life and education ==
Grace Eldering was born in Rancher, Montana, in 1900. Eldering's parents had immigrated to the United States before she was born, with her mother having arrived from Scotland and her father from the Netherlands. She contracted and survived whooping cough when she was five, leading to her involvement in science in her adulthood. After high school Eldering attended the University of Montana for four semesters before money troubles caused her to drop out. She taught for four years saving up enough money to return to the university and obtain a Bachelor of Science. She then went on to teach English and biology at Hysham High School. She continued her education later in life and earned a Ph.D. in science in 1942 from Johns Hopkins University.

== Career and research ==
In 1928, Eldering moved to Lansing, Michigan, to volunteer at the Michigan Bureau of Laboratories. She was hired within six months to do routine bacteriologic analysis. She eventually moved to the Michigan Department of Health Laboratory in Grand Rapids, Michigan, where in 1932 she joined Pearl Kendrick and Loney Clinton Gordon to work on culturing samples of pertussis bacteria in the laboratory. Development of this pertussis vaccine was notable for including the first large-scale controlled clinical trial of a pertussis vaccine. This was conducted by setting up a large network of medical professionals and neighborhood organizations in order to obtain large samples of pertussis from as many different patients as possible. Kendrick and Eldering started a "cough plate diagnostic service" on November 1, 1932, whereby cough plates of suspected infected individuals could be sent in for confirmation. This also allowed them to determine the time period of infectivity of pertussis and when those infected were at highest risk of infecting others around them. In addition, they set up a method of quarantine for Grand Rapids that would keep any outbreaks from spreading and required a 35-day period of isolation for infected patients. Within three years, their methods had become an official routine for both the county and the entire state. While trying to create these methods, Eldering and Kendrick faced difficulty in financing the work. Their research took place in the middle of the Great Depression, making already scarce funding harder to get obtain. They eventually received finance from federal emergency relief programs, city government and private donors. The whole experiment was conducted after hours at work because the health department was so understaffed they could not spend time on it during normal work hours. They also had nurse technicians and private physicians volunteer their time to help prepare and give the vaccine.

While the methods they developed had allowed Kendrick and Eldering to make specific vaccines for those infected, they did not begin work on a general vaccine until late 1933. Their outreach system among physicians, city officials, and school administrations allowed rapid inoculation of children and other city inhabitants. This trial ran for more than three years (March 1934 – November 1937) and enrolled more than 5,815 children. The design and procedures for the trials were a work in progress considering neither Kendrick or Eldering had experience in creating clinical trials. In October 1935 they presented their preliminary findings at the annual American Public Health Association meeting. Many senior figures at this meeting did not want to endorse this vaccine because they felt it was not adequately tested. Eventually Kendrick and Eldering called in a consultant for their trial, Wade Hampton Frost. Frost was a professor of epidemiology at Johns Hopkins and made two separate trips to Grand Rapids in November 1936, and in December 1937 to critique the trial and help make a plan for analyzing the data. They continued working on refining their inoculation methods through 1938, when they instituted a three vaccine system that involved less of the inactivated bacteria, but was much more effective at providing resistance to infection. Mass production of this new version began across Michigan in 1938 and nationwide by 1940.

In 1951, Eldering succeeded Kendrick as Chief of the Western Michigan Laboratory of the Health Department, and remained there until she retired in 1969. Eldering continued to live in Grand Rapids and volunteered with the blind and physically handicapped until she died in 1988.

== Awards and honors ==
Eldering was inducted into the Michigan Women's Hall of Fame in 1983 for her work in public health.

Eldering, alongside Kendrick and Gordon, are honored with a statue titled Adulation: The Future of Science at the Michigan State University Research Center in Grand Rapids, Michigan. The statue, designed by Jay Hall Carpenter, is part of the city's Community Legends Project, which seeks to build statues honoring prominent Grand Rapids figures.
