= Pearl Kendrick =

American bacteriologist

- Born: Pearl Louella Kendrick; August 24, 1890; Wheaton, Illinois
- Died: October 8, 1980 (aged 90); Grand Rapids, Michigan
- Education: Syracuse University; Johns Hopkins University
- Scientific career
- Fields: Bacteriology, Public Health

Pearl Louella Kendrick (August 24, 1890 – October 8, 1980) was an American bacteriologist known for co-developing the first successful whooping cough vaccine alongside fellow Michigan Department of Public Health scientist Grace Eldering and chemist Loney Gordon in the 1930s. In the decades after the initial pertussis vaccine rollout, Kendrick contributed to the promotion of international vaccine standards in Latin America and the Soviet Union. Kendrick and her colleagues also developed a 3-in-1 shot for diphtheria, pertussis, and tetanus (also called the DTP vaccine), which was initially released in 1948.

== Early life and education ==
Pearl Louella Kendrick was born on August 24, 1890, in Wheaton, Illinois to Ella and Milton Kendrick. Kendrick would then suffer from whooping cough at the age of three. She graduated high school in 1908 and attended Greenville College for a year before transferring to Syracuse University. In 1914, she received her B.S. in Zoology from Syracuse. Kendrick worked as a teacher in upstate New York, but continued her scientific education by studying bacteriology with Hans Zinsser at Columbia University in 1917. Kendrick graduated from Johns Hopkins University in 1932 with a Doctor of Science in Bacteriology, while simultaneously working at the Michigan Department of Public Health as an associate director and chief.

== Whooping cough vaccine research ==
Kendrick moved to Grand Rapids, Michigan and became focused on researching whooping cough, a contagious disease caused by the bacterium Bordetella pertussis that was responsible for killing an estimated 6000 people annually in the U.S., almost entirely children. Kendrick worked at the Western Michigan Branch Laboratory of the Michigan Department of Health. It was there that she met Grace Eldering, a fellow scientist at the Department who also had an interest in developing a pertussis vaccine. Loney Clinton (later Loney Gordon) to focus on laboratory culture of the causal agent, the bacterium Bordetella pertussis.

Kendrick and Eldering headed the vaccine project through program development, testing, and the eventual inoculation of children with the pertussis vaccine. The pair conducted door-to-door field research where they took samples from sick children in the Grand Rapids area. These samples were used to develop the whooping cough vaccine. It was given to a treatment group in an experiment known as the Grand Rapids Trials, and data of the results was analyzed for three years. In the midst of their research, World War II was also in full effect. This led to many scientific studies facing cessation due to being underfunded. First Lady Eleanor Roosevelt took interest in Kendrick and Eldering, and obtained funds from the Works Progress Administration to support their vaccine development. the data collected from the trials for nearly three years, it was found that the vaccine was a success. Michigan started distributing the vaccines in 1940 and deaths from whooping cough declined. Their work contributed significantly to the development of cough plate diagnostics. The collaborative nature of their work within the bacteriological research community and their partnerships with the Grand Rapids public health community are recognized as an important contribution to vaccine research and public health.

=== Further research and modern implications ===
In the following years, Kendrick, Eldering, and Gordon developed a vaccine for diphtheria, pertussis, and tetanus (DPT vaccine). DPT vaccines were the prevailing defense against the three diseases until concerns arose about the safety and efficacy of this vaccine type in the 1980s and 1990s. The DPT vaccine laid the groundwork for new vaccine developments. Subsequently, a molecularly different variation of the DPT vaccine called the DTaP was created and became the principal vaccine for diphtheria, pertussis, and tetanus in the U.S. and abroad.

In 1951, Kendrick retired from the Michigan Department of Public Health. After retiring, she became a faculty member at the University of Michigan's Department of Epidemiology. She retired from the university in 1960. Kendrick served as president of the Michigan American Society for Microbiology.

== Later life and death ==
Kendrick and Grace Eldering shared a house in Grand Rapids and attended Fountain Street Church. She died on October 8, 1980, in Grand Rapids.

== Awards and honors ==
Kendrick was inducted into the Michigan Women's Hall of Fame Historical Honors Division in 1983.

Kendrick, alongside Eldering and Gordon, are honored with a statue titled Adulation: The Future of Science at the Michigan State University Research Center in Grand Rapids, Michigan. The statue, designed by Jay Hall Carpenter, is part of the city's Community Legends Project, which seeks to build statues honoring prominent Grand Rapids figures.
