= Cyclase =

A cyclase is an enzyme, almost always a lyase, that catalyzes a chemical reaction to form a cyclic compound. Important cyclase enzymes include:

- Adenylyl cyclase, which forms cyclic AMP from adenosine triphosphate (EC 4.6.1.1)
  - ADCY1
  - ADCY2
  - ADCY3
  - ADCY4
  - ADCY5
  - ADCY6
  - ADCY7
  - ADCY8
  - ADCY9
  - ADCY10
- Guanylyl cyclase, which forms cyclic GMP from guanosine triphosphate (EC 4.6.1.2)
  - GUCY1A2
  - GUCY1A3
  - GUCY1B3
  - Guanylate cyclase 2C
  - Guanylate cyclase 2D
  - Guanylate cyclase 2F
  - NPR1
  - NPR2
- Protein cyclase, a ligase enzyme that produces backbone-cyclised proteins by intramolecular transpeptidation
