= Adenylyl cyclase =

Enzyme with key regulatory roles in most cells

Adenylate cyclase
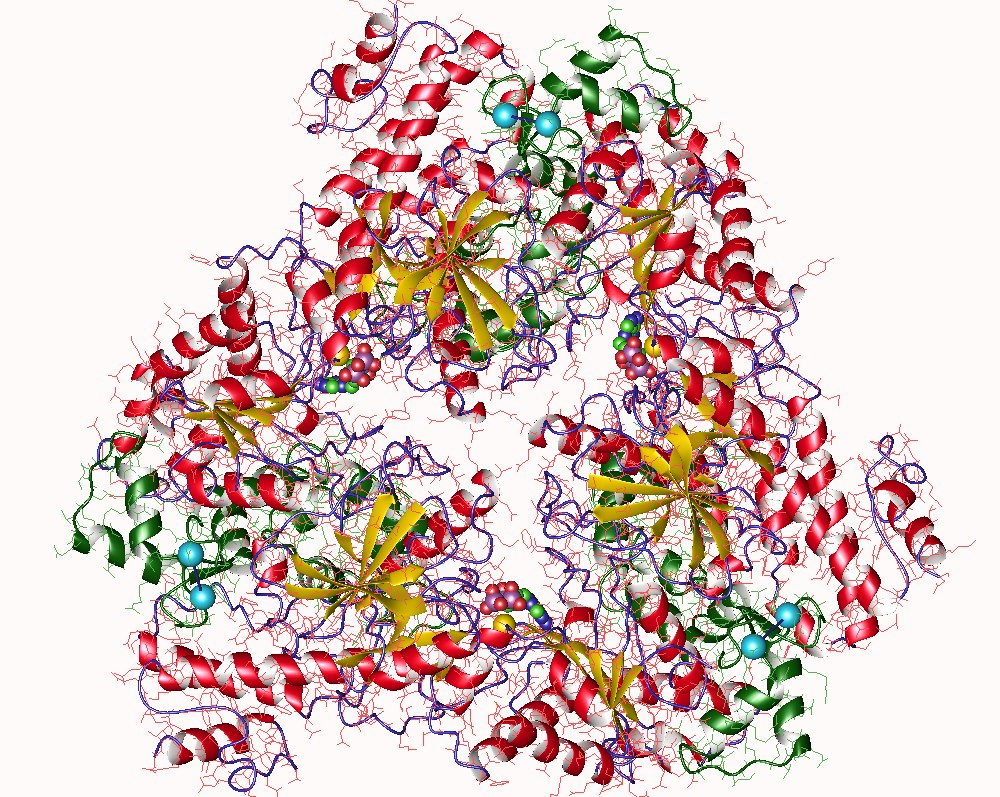
- Adenylate cyclase (calmodulin sensitive) trimer, Bacillus anthracis Epinephrine binds its receptor, that associates with a heterotrimeric G protein. The G protein associates with adenylyl cyclase, which converts ATP to cAMP, spreading the signal.

Identifiers
- EC no.: 4.6.1.1
- CAS no.: 9012-42-4

Databases
- BRENDA: enzyme data
- ExPASy: NiceZyme view
- KEGG: enzyme entry
- MetaCyc: metabolic pathway
- Rhea: reactions
- PDB structures: RCSB PDB PDBe PDBsum
- Gene Ontology: AmiGO / QuickGO
Search
- PMC: articles
- PubMed: articles
- NCBI: proteins

Adenylate cyclase (EC 4.6.1.1, also commonly known as adenyl cyclase and adenylyl cyclase, abbreviated AC) is an enzyme with systematic name ATP diphosphate-lyase (cyclizing; 3′,5′-cyclic-AMP-forming). It catalyzes the following reaction:

ATP $\longrightarrow$ 3′,5′-cyclic AMP + diphosphate

It has key regulatory roles in essentially all cells. It is the most polyphyletic known enzyme: six distinct classes have been described, all catalyzing the same reaction but representing unrelated gene families with no known sequence or structural homology. The best known class of adenylyl cyclases is class III or AC-III (Roman numerals are used for classes). AC-III occurs widely in eukaryotes and has important roles in many human tissues.

All classes of adenylyl cyclase catalyse the conversion of adenosine triphosphate (ATP) to 3',5'-cyclic AMP (cAMP) and pyrophosphate. Magnesium ions are generally required and appear to be closely involved in the enzymatic mechanism. The cAMP produced by AC then serves as a regulatory signal via specific cAMP-binding proteins, either transcription factors, enzymes (e.g., cAMP-dependent kinases), or ion transporters.

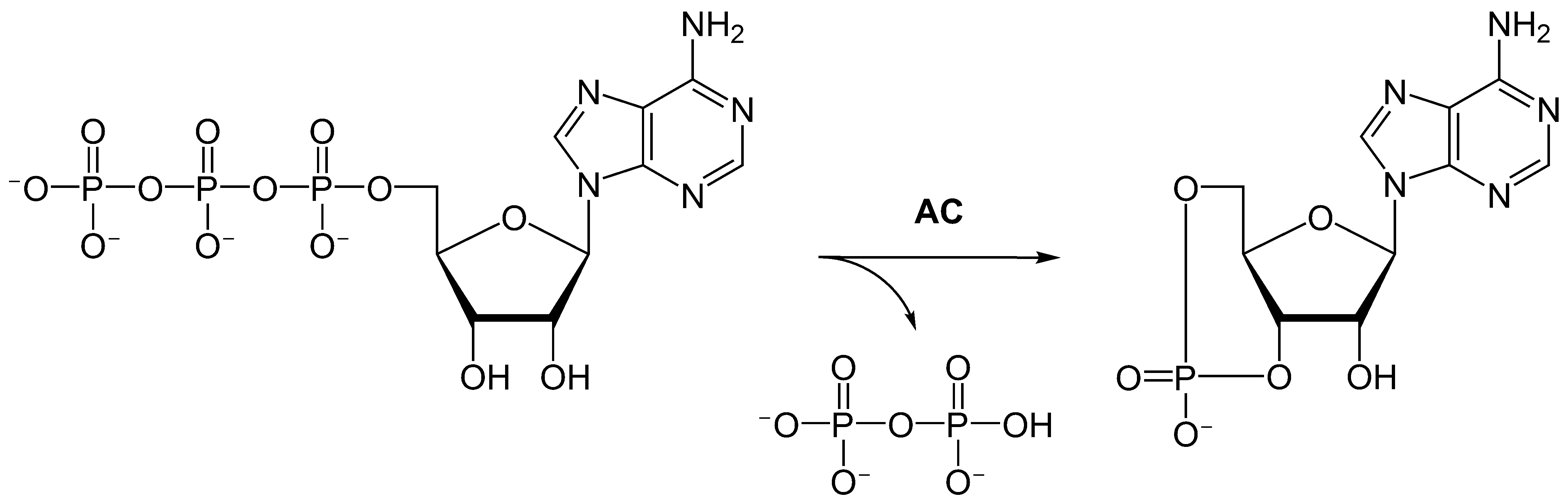
Adenylyl cyclase catalyzes the conversion of ATP to 3',5'-cyclic AMP.

== Classes ==
=== Class I ===
Adenylate cyclase, class-I

Identifiers
- Symbol: Adenylate_cycl
- Pfam: PF01295
- InterPro: IPR000274
- PROSITE: PDOC00837
Available protein structures:
- PDB: IPR000274 PF01295 (ECOD; PDBsum)
- AlphaFold: IPR000274; PF01295

A membrane bound enzyme that converts adenosine triphosphate (ATP) to cyclic adenosine monophosphate (cAMP).

The first class of adenylyl cyclases occur in many bacteria including E. coli (as CyaA P00936 [unrelated to the Class II enzyme]). This was the first class of AC to be characterized. It was observed that E. coli deprived of glucose produce cAMP that serves as an internal signal to activate expression of genes for importing and metabolizing other sugars. cAMP exerts this effect by binding the transcription factor CRP, also known as CAP. Class I AC's are large cytosolic enzymes (~100 kDa) with a large regulatory domain (~50 kDa) that indirectly senses glucose levels. As of 2012, no crystal structure is available for class I AC.

Some indirect structural information is available for this class. It is known that the N-terminal half is the catalytic portion, and that it requires two Mg^{2+} ions. S103, S113, D114, D116 and W118 are the five absolutely essential residues. The class I catalytic domain (Pfam PF12633) belongs to the same superfamily (Pfam CL0260) as the palm domain of DNA polymerase beta (Pfam PF18765). Aligning its sequence onto the structure onto a related archaeal CCA tRNA nucleotidyltransferase (PDB: 1R89) allows for assignment of the residues to specific functions: γ-phosphate binding, structural stabilization, DxD motif for metal ion binding, and finally ribose binding.

=== Class II ===
These adenylyl cyclases are toxins secreted by pathogenic bacteria such as Bacillus anthracis, Bordetella pertussis, Pseudomonas aeruginosa, and Vibrio vulnificus during infections. These bacteria also secrete proteins that enable the AC-II to enter host cells, where the exogenous AC activity undermines normal cellular processes. The genes for Class II ACs are known as cyaA, one of which is anthrax toxin. Several crystal structures are known for AC-II enzymes.

=== Class III ===
Adenylyl cyclase class-3/guanylyl cyclase

Identifiers
- Symbol: Guanylate_cyc
- Pfam: PF00211
- Pfam clan: CL0276
- InterPro: IPR001054
- SMART: SM00044
- PROSITE: PS50125
- SCOP2: 1tl7 / SCOPe / SUPFAM
- TCDB: 8.A.85
- OPM superfamily: 546
- OPM protein: 6r3q
Available protein structures:
- PDB: IPR001054 PF00211 (ECOD; PDBsum)
- AlphaFold: IPR001054; PF00211

These adenylyl cyclases are the most familiar based on extensive study due to their important roles in human health. They are also found in some bacteria, notably Mycobacterium tuberculosis where they appear to have a key role in pathogenesis. Most AC-III's are integral membrane proteins involved in transducing extracellular signals into intracellular responses. A Nobel Prize was awarded to Earl Sutherland in 1971 for discovering the key role of AC-III in human liver, where adrenaline indirectly stimulates AC to mobilize stored energy in the "fight or flight" response. The effect of adrenaline is via a G protein signaling cascade, which transmits chemical signals from outside the cell across the membrane to the inside of the cell (cytoplasm). The outside signal (in this case, adrenaline) binds to a receptor, which transmits a signal to the G protein, which transmits a signal to adenylyl cyclase, which transmits a signal by converting adenosine triphosphate to cyclic adenosine monophosphate (cAMP). cAMP is known as a second messenger.

Cyclic AMP is an important molecule in eukaryotic signal transduction, a so-called second messenger. Adenylyl cyclases are often activated or inhibited by G proteins, which are coupled to membrane receptors and thus can respond to hormonal or other stimuli. Following activation of adenylyl cyclase, the resulting cAMP acts as a second messenger by interacting with and regulating other proteins such as protein kinase A and cyclic nucleotide-gated ion channels.

Photoactivated adenylyl cyclase (PAC) was discovered in Euglena gracilis and can be expressed in other organisms through genetic manipulation. Shining blue light on a cell containing PAC activates it and abruptly increases the rate of conversion of ATP to cAMP. This is a useful technique for researchers in neuroscience because it allows them to quickly increase the intracellular cAMP levels in particular neurons, and to study the effect of that increase in neural activity on the behavior of the organism. A green-light activated rhodopsin adenylyl cyclase (CaRhAC) has recently been engineered by modifying the nucleotide binding pocket of rhodopsin guanylyl cyclase.

==== Structure ====
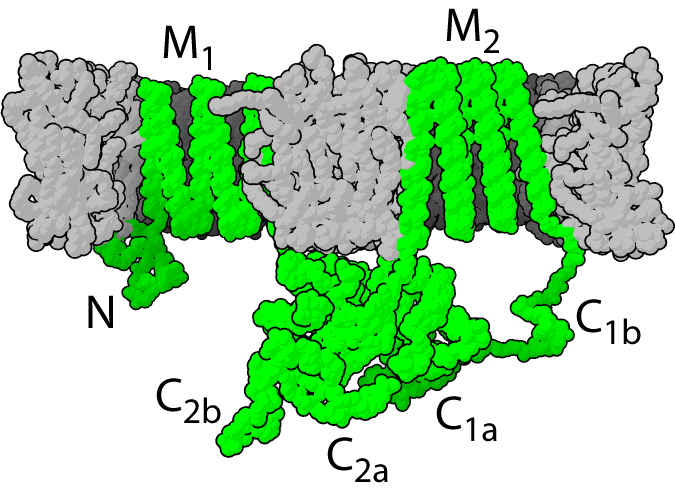
Structure of adenylyl cyclase

Most class III adenylyl cyclases are transmembrane proteins with 12 transmembrane segments. The protein is organized with 6 transmembrane segments, then the C1 cytoplasmic domain, then another 6 membrane segments, and then a second cytoplasmic domain called C2. The important parts for function are the N-terminus and the C1 and C2 regions. The C1a and C2a subdomains are homologous and form an intramolecular 'dimer' that forms the active site. In Mycobacterium tuberculosis and many other bacterial cases, the AC-III polypeptide is only half as long, comprising one 6-transmembrane domain followed by a cytoplasmic domain, but two of these form a functional homodimer that resembles the mammalian architecture with two active sites. In non-animal class III ACs, the catalytic cytoplasmic domain is seen associated with other (not necessarily transmembrane) domains.

Class III adenylyl cyclase domains can be further divided into four subfamilies, termed class IIIa through IIId. Animal membrane-bound ACs belong to class IIIa.

==== Mechanism ====
The reaction happens with two metal cofactors (Mg or Mn) coordinated to the two aspartate residues on C1. They perform a nucleophilic attack of the 3'-OH group of the ribose on the α-phosphoryl group of ATP. The two lysine and aspartate residues on C2 selects ATP over GTP for the substrate, so that the enzyme is not a guanylyl cyclase. A pair of arginine and asparagine residues on C2 stabilizes the transition state. In many proteins, these residues are nevertheless mutated while retaining the adenylyl cyclase activity.

==== Types ====
There are ten known isoforms of adenylyl cyclases in mammals:

- ADCY1
- ADCY2
- ADCY3
- ADCY4
- ADCY5
- ADCY6
- ADCY7
- ADCY8
- ADCY9
- ADCY10

These are also sometimes called simply AC1, AC2, etc., and, somewhat confusingly, sometimes Roman numerals are used for these isoforms that all belong to the overall AC class III. They differ mainly in how they are regulated, and are differentially expressed in various tissues throughout mammalian development.

==== Regulation ====
Adenylyl cyclase is regulated by G proteins, which can be found in the monomeric form or the heterotrimeric form, consisting of three subunits. Adenylyl cyclase activity is controlled by heterotrimeric G proteins. The inactive or inhibitory form exists when the complex consists of alpha, beta, and gamma subunits, with GDP bound to the alpha subunit. In order to become active, a ligand must bind to the receptor and cause a conformational change. This conformational change causes the alpha subunit to dissociate from the complex and become bound to GTP. This G-alpha-GTP complex then binds to adenylyl cyclase and causes activation and the release of cAMP. Since a good signal requires the help of enzymes, which turn on and off signals quickly, there must also be a mechanism in which adenylyl cyclase deactivates and inhibits cAMP. The deactivation of the active G-alpha-GTP complex is accomplished rapidly by GTP hydrolysis due to the reaction being catalyzed by the intrinsic enzymatic activity of GTPase located in the alpha subunit. It is also regulated by forskolin, as well as other isoform-specific effectors:

- Isoforms I, III, and VIII are also stimulated by Ca^{2+}/calmodulin.
- Isoforms V and VI are inhibited by Ca^{2+} in a calmodulin-independent manner.
- Isoforms II, IV and IX are stimulated by alpha subunit of the G protein.
- Isoforms I, V and VI are most clearly inhibited by Gi, while other isoforms show less dual regulation by the inhibitory G protein.
- Soluble AC (sAC) is not a transmembrane form and is not regulated by G proteins or forskolin, instead acts as a bicarbonate/pH sensor. It is anchored at various locations within the cell and, with phosphodiesterases, forms local cAMP signalling domains.

In neurons, calcium-sensitive adenylyl cyclases are located next to calcium ion channels for faster reaction to Ca^{2+} influx; they are suspected of playing an important role in learning processes. This is supported by the fact that adenylyl cyclases are coincidence detectors, meaning that they are activated only by several different signals occurring together. In peripheral cells and tissues adenylyl cyclases appear to form molecular complexes with specific receptors and other signaling proteins in an isoform-specific manner.

==== Function ====
Individual transmembrane adenylyl cyclase isoforms have been linked to numerous physiological functions. Soluble adenylyl cyclase (sAC, AC10) has a critical role in sperm motility. Adenylyl cyclase has been implicated in memory formation, functioning as a coincidence detector.

=== Class IV ===
Adenylyl cyclase CyaB

Identifiers
- Symbol: CyaB
- InterPro: IPR008173
- CATH: 1YEM
- SCOP2: 2ACA / SCOPe / SUPFAM
- CDD: cd07890
Available protein structures:
- PDB: IPR008173
- AlphaFold: IPR008173

AC-IV was first reported in the bacterium Aeromonas hydrophila, and the structure of the AC-IV from Yersinia pestis has been reported. These are the smallest of the AC enzyme classes; the AC-IV (CyaB) from Yersinia is a dimer of 19 kDa subunits with no known regulatory components (PDB: 2FJT). AC-IV forms a superfamily with mammalian thiamine-triphosphatase called CYTH (CyaB, thiamine triphosphatase).

=== Classes V and VI ===
AC Class VI (DUF3095)

Identifiers
- Symbol: DUF3095
- Pfam: PF11294
- InterPro: IPR021445
Available protein structures:
- PDB: IPR021445 PF11294 (ECOD; PDBsum)
- AlphaFold: IPR021445; PF11294

These forms of AC have been reported in specific bacteria (Prevotella ruminicola O68902 and Rhizobium etli Q8KY20, respectively) and have not been extensively characterized. There are a few extra members (~400 in Pfam) known to be in class VI. Class VI enzymes possess a catalytic core similar to the one in Class III.

== Additional images ==
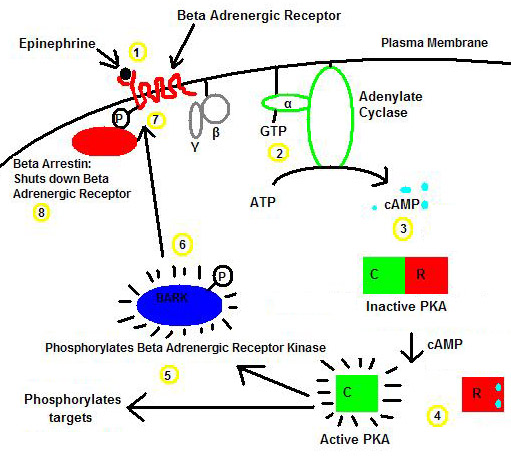
Beta adrenergic receptor kinase pathway
