= Avenciguat =

Chemical compound

Clinical data
- Other names: BI 685509

Legal status
- Legal status: Investigational

Identifiers
- IUPAC name: 5-Ethoxy-1-[6-[3-methyl-2-[[5-methyl-2-(oxan-4-yl)-3,4-dihydro-1H-isoquinolin-6-yl]methoxy]phenyl]pyridin-2-yl]pyrazole-4-carboxylic acid
- CAS Number: 1579514-06-9
- PubChem CID: 89992620
- ChemSpider: 128921322
- UNII: ZA7KTB4PSP
- KEGG: D13034
- ChEMBL: ChEMBL5314503

Chemical and physical data
- Formula: C_{34}H_{38}N_{4}O_{5}
- Molar mass: 582.701 g·mol^{−1}
- 3D model (JSmol): Interactive image
- SMILES: CCOC1=C(C=NN1C2=CC=CC(=N2)C3=CC=CC(=C3OCC4=C(C5=C(CN(CC5)C6CCOCC6)C=C4)C)C)C(=O)O
- InChI: InChI=1S/C34H38N4O5/c1-4-42-33-29(34(39)40)19-35-38(33)31-10-6-9-30(36-31)28-8-5-7-22(2)32(28)43-21-25-12-11-24-20-37(16-13-27(24)23(25)3)26-14-17-41-18-15-26/h5-12,19,26H,4,13-18,20-21H2,1-3H3,(H,39,40); Key:KWNFFNFBUMFTHK-UHFFFAOYSA-N

Avenciguat (development name BI 685509) is a soluble guanylate cyclase activator developed by Boehringer Ingelheim for kidney disease, and cirrhosis.
