= TRNA CCA-pyrophosphorylase =

TRNA CCA-pyrophosphorylase may refer to the following enzymes:

- CCA tRNA nucleotidyltransferase
- TRNA cytidylyltransferase
