= Mosliciguat =

Chemical compound

Clinical data
- Other names: BAY 1237592

Legal status
- Legal status: Investigational

Identifiers
- IUPAC name: (5S)-5-[2-(4-Carboxyphenyl)ethyl-[2-[2-[[2-chloro-4-[4-(trifluoromethyl)phenyl]phenyl]methoxy]phenyl]ethyl]amino]-5,6,7,8-tetrahydroquinoline-2-carboxylic acid
- CAS Number: 2231749-54-3
- PubChem CID: 154572869
- ChemSpider: 115009506
- UNII: FL039XI4KF

Chemical and physical data
- Formula: C_{41}H_{36}ClF_{3}N_{2}O_{5}
- Molar mass: 729.19 g·mol^{−1}
- 3D model (JSmol): Interactive image
- SMILES: C1C[C@@H](C2=C(C1)N=C(C=C2)C(=O)O)N(CCC3=CC=C(C=C3)C(=O)O)CCC4=CC=CC=C4OCC5=C(C=C(C=C5)C6=CC=C(C=C6)C(F)(F)F)Cl
- InChI: InChI=1S/C41H36ClF3N2O5/c42-34-24-30(27-14-16-32(17-15-27)41(43,44)45)12-13-31(34)25-52-38-7-2-1-4-28(38)21-23-47(22-20-26-8-10-29(11-9-26)39(48)49)37-6-3-5-35-33(37)18-19-36(46-35)40(50)51/h1-2,4,7-19,24,37H,3,5-6,20-23,25H2,(H,48,49)(H,50,51)/t37-/m0/s1; Key:HFCWZVGKWGOBKV-QNGWXLTQSA-N

Mosliciguat (BAY 1237592) is an inhaled soluble guanylate cyclase activator developed by Bayer for pulmonary arterial hypertension.
