= CyaA =

Respiratory toxin

Bifunctional hemolysin/adenylate cyclase
- Schematic representation of CyaA.

Identifiers
- Organism: Bordetella pertussis
- Symbol: cya
- Alt. symbols: cyaA
- Entrez: 45387797
- RefSeq (Prot): WP_010929995.1
- UniProt: P0DKX7

Other data
- EC number: 4.6.1.1
- Chromosome: genome: 0.49 - 0.5 Mb
Search for
- Structures: Swiss-model
- Domains: InterPro

Adenylate cyclase toxin (CyaA) is released from bacterium Bordetella pertussis by the T1SS (Type 1 secretion system) and released in the host's respiratory tract in order to suppress its early innate and subsequent adaptive immune defense.

CyaA plays a particular role in the early phases of airway colonization. It is able to instantly ablate the bactericidal oxidative burst, along with the opsonophagocytic killing capacities of neutrophils and macrophages. As a result, it enables establishment of Bordetella infection of airway mucosa and promotes immune evasion of B. pertussis, by affecting the host's immune cells.

== Structure ==
The toxin is a 1706 residue-long polypeptide that consists of an N-terminal ~400 residue-long adenylate cyclase (AC) enzyme that is linked to a characteristic RTX hemolysin (Hly) moiety of ~1300 residues. This Hly moiety itself consists of four functional subdomains, comprising: (i) a hydrophobic pore-forming domain; (ii) an activation domain, with the two posttranslationally acylated lysine residues; (iii) a receptor-binding RTX domain consisting of ~40 typical calcium-binding RTX nonapeptide repeats]; and (iv) a non-processed C-terminal secretion signal recognized by a bacterial type I secretion system (T1SS), respectively.

== Mode of action in host cells ==
Once in host cells, CyaA binds the complement receptor 3 (CR3), the αMβ2 integrin known also as CD11b/CD18 or Mac-1. Then, the toxin translocates its AC enzyme domain across the cytoplasmic membrane of CR3-expressing myeloid cells, such as macrophages, neutrophils and dendritic cells.

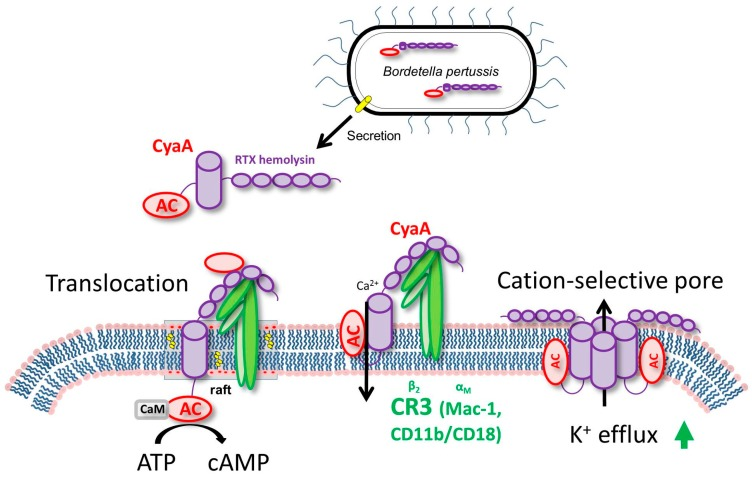
Mode of action of adenylate cyclase toxin (CyaA) on phagocyte membrane.

Inserting in the cell's membrane results in an influx of calcium ions that leads to a calpain-mediated cleavage of talin. The CyaA–CR3 complex relocates into lipid rafts and the AC domain is translocated across the cellular membrane into the transmembrane region, where signaling complexes, such as protein kinase A, are clustered.

Inside the cells, the AC enzyme binds calmodulin and catalyzes unregulated conversion of ATP into the key second messenger molecule 3',5'-cyclic adenosine monophosphate (cAMP). cAMP is responsible for the incapacitation of the bactericidal activities of the target cells. The RTX hemolysin part of CyaA is functionally independent of AC domain and forms oligomeric cation-selective pores that allow cytosolic potassium ions to leak from cells via the cellular membrane.

== Interference with immune defence ==
The fast production of very high levels of intracellular cAMP in CD11b-expressing immune cells that encounter CyaA, immediately interferes with the physiological functions of phagocytes. In monocytes and macrophages, the CyaA-produced cAMP signaling through the cAMP/protein kinase A (PKA) pathway blocks the production of reactive oxygen species (ROS). This also halts the complement-mediated uptake of opsonized particles. At higher CyaA doses, FcR-mediated phagocytosis is also inhibited.

Through cAMP signaling, CyaA also alters TLR-triggered maturation of dendritic cells, inhibiting proinflammatory IL-12 and TNF-α secretion and enhancing IL-10 production and Treg expansion, preventing the induction of adaptive immune responses to Bordetella infections.

The enzymatic AC activity of CyaA also seems to prolong the intracellular survival of non-opsonized internalized (invading) B. pertussis bacteria that enter into human and murine macrophages by a non-phagocytic mechanism.

== See also ==
- Pertussis toxin
- Anthrax toxin
