= Pertussis toxin =

Group of toxins

Pertussis toxin, subunit 1
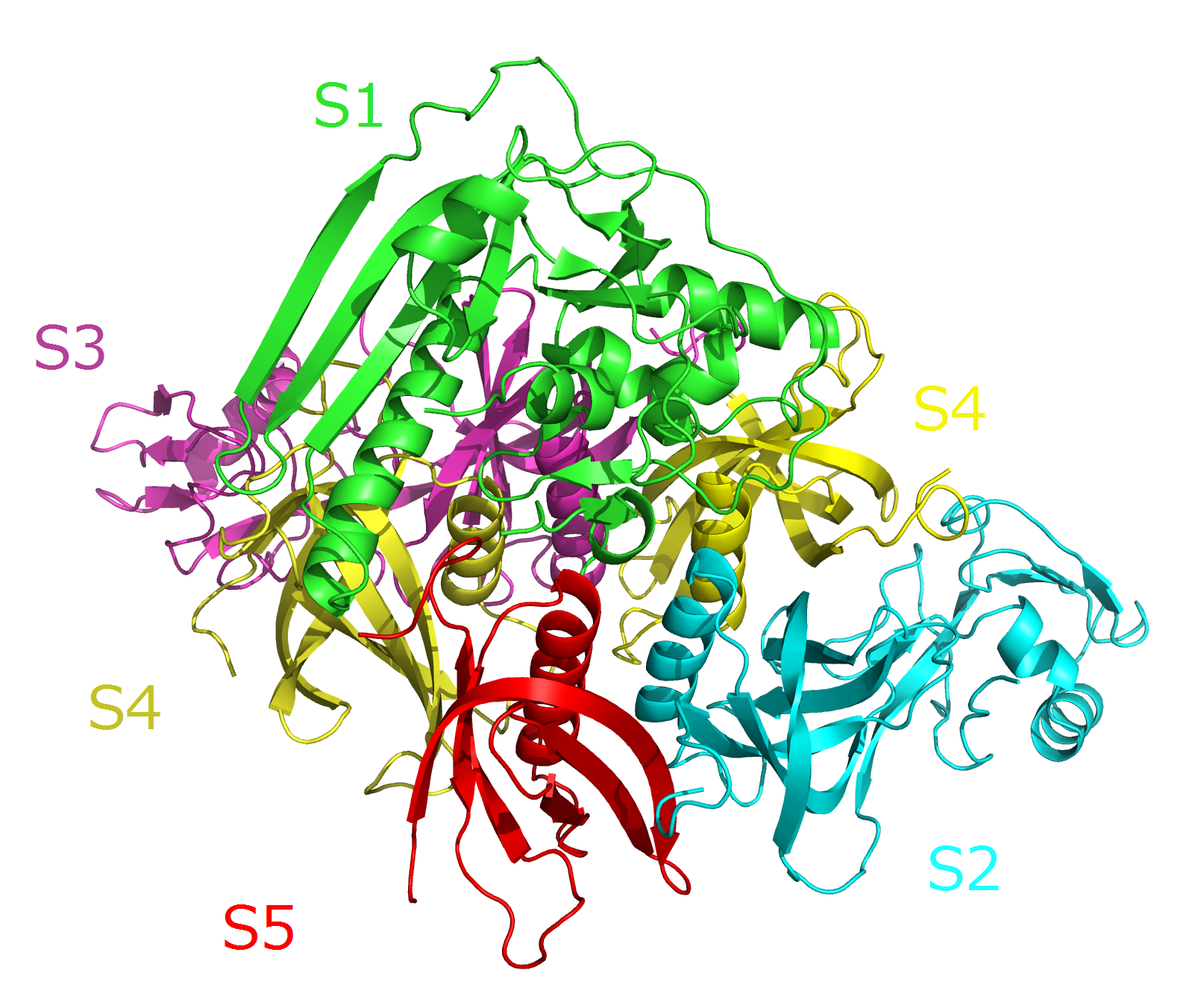
- The crystal structure of pertussis toxin,

Identifiers
- Symbol: Pertussis_S1
- Pfam: PF02917
- InterPro: IPR003898
- SCOP2: 1bcp / SCOPe / SUPFAM
Available protein structures:
- PDB: IPR003898 PF02917 (ECOD; PDBsum)
- AlphaFold: IPR003898; PF02917

Pertussis toxin, subunit 2 and 3

Identifiers
- Symbol: Pertussis_S2S3
- Pfam: PF02918
- InterPro: IPR003899
- SCOP2: 1bcp / SCOPe / SUPFAM
Available protein structures:
- PDB: IPR003899 PF02918 (ECOD; PDBsum)
- AlphaFold: IPR003899; PF02918

Pertussis toxin, subunit 4

Identifiers
- Symbol: Pertus-S4-tox
- Pfam: PF09275
- InterPro: IPR015355
- SCOP2: 1prt / SCOPe / SUPFAM
Available protein structures:
- PDB: IPR015355 PF09275 (ECOD; PDBsum)
- AlphaFold: IPR015355; PF09275

Pertussis toxin, subunit 5

Identifiers
- Symbol: Pertus-S5-tox
- Pfam: PF09276
- InterPro: IPR015356
- SCOP2: 1prt / SCOPe / SUPFAM
Available protein structures:
- PDB: IPR015356 PF09276 (ECOD; PDBsum)
- AlphaFold: IPR015356; PF09276

Pertussis toxin (PT) is a protein-based AB_{5}-type exotoxin produced by the bacterium Bordetella pertussis, which causes whooping cough. PT is involved in the colonization of the respiratory tract and the establishment of infection. Research suggests PT may have a therapeutic role in treating a number of common human ailments, including hypertension, viral infection, and autoimmunity.

== History ==
PT clearly plays a central role in the pathogenesis of pertussis although this was discovered only in the early 1980s. The appearance of pertussis is quite recent, compared with other epidemic infectious diseases. The earliest mention of pertussis, or whooping cough, is of an outbreak in Paris in 1414. This was published in Moulton's The Mirror of Health, in 1640. Another epidemic of pertussis took place in Paris in 1578 and was described by a contemporary observer, Guillaume de Baillou. Pertussis was well known throughout Europe by the middle of the 18th century. Jules Bordet and Octave Gengou described in 1900 the finding of a new "ovoid bacillus" in the sputum of a 6-month-old infant with whooping cough. They were also the first to cultivate Bordetella pertussis at the Pasteur Institute in Brussels in 1906.

One difference between the different species of Bordetella is that B. pertussis produces PT and the other species do not. Bordetella parapertussis shows the most similarity to B. pertussis and was therefore used for research determining the role of PT in causing the typical symptoms of whooping cough. Rat studies showed the development of paroxysmal coughing, a characteristic for whooping cough, occurred in rats infected with B. pertussis. Rats infected with B. parapertussis or a PT-deficient mutant of B. pertussis did not show this symptom; neither of these two strains produced PT.

== Structure ==
A large group of bacterial exotoxins are referred to as "A/B toxins", in essence because they are formed from two subunits. The "A" subunit possesses enzyme activity and is transferred to the host cell following a conformational change in the membrane-bound transport "B" subunit. Pertussis toxin is an exotoxin with six subunits (named S1 through S5—each complex contains two copies of S4). The subunits are arranged in A-B structure: the A component is enzymatically active and is formed from the S1 subunit, while the B component is the receptor-binding portion and is made up of subunits S2–S5. The subunits are encoded by ptx genes encoded on a large PT operon that also includes additional genes that encode Ptl proteins. Together, these proteins form the PT secretion complex.

== Mechanism of pathogenesis ==
PT is released from B. pertussis in an inactive form. Following PT binding to a cell membrane receptor, it is taken up in an endosome, after which it undergoes retrograde transport to the trans-Golgi network and endoplasmic reticulum. At some point during this transport, the A subunit (or protomer) becomes activated, perhaps through the action of glutathione and ATP. PT catalyzes the ADP-ribosylation of the α_{i} subunits of the heterotrimeric G protein. This prevents the G proteins from interacting with G protein-coupled receptors on the cell membrane, thus interfering with intracellular communication. The Gi subunits remain locked in their GDP-bound, inactive state, thus unable to inhibit adenylate cyclase activity, leading to increased cellular concentrations of cAMP.

Increased intracellular cAMP affects normal biological signaling. The toxin causes several systemic effects, among which is an increased release of insulin, causing hypoglycemia. Whether the effects of pertussis toxin are responsible for the paroxysmal cough remains unknown.

As a result of this unique mechanism, PT has also become widely used as a biochemical tool to ADP-ribosylate GTP-binding proteins in the study of signal transduction. It has also become an essential component of new acellular vaccines.

== Effects on the immune system ==
PT has been shown to affect the innate immune response. It inhibits the early recruitment of neutrophils and macrophages, and interferes with early chemokine production and neutrophil chemotaxis. Chemokines are signaling molecules produced by infected cells and attract neutrophils and macrophages. Neutrophil chemotaxis is thought to be disrupted by inhibiting G-protein-coupled chemokine receptors by the ADP-ribosylation of G_{i} proteins.

Due to the disrupted signaling pathways, synthesis of chemokines will be affected. This will prevent the infected cell from producing them and thereby inhibiting recruitment of neutrophils. Under normal circumstances, alveolar macrophages and other lung cells produce a variety of chemokines. PT has been found to inhibit the early transcription of keratinocyte-derived chemokine, macrophage inflammatory protein 2 and LPS-induced CXC chemokine. Eventually, PT causes lymphocytosis, one of the systemic manifestations of whooping cough.

PT, a decisive virulence determinant of B. pertussis, is able to cross the blood–brain barrier by increasing its permeability. As a result, PT can cause severe neurological complications; however, recently it has been found that the medicinal usage of Pertussis toxin can promote the development of regulatory T cells and prevent central nervous system autoimmune disease, such as multiple sclerosis.

== Metabolism ==
PT is known to dissociate into two parts in the endoplasmic reticulum (ER): the enzymatically active A subunit (S1) and the cell-binding B subunit. The two subunits are separated by proteolic cleavage. The B subunit will undergo ubiquitin-dependent degradation by the 26S proteasome. However, the A subunit lacks lysine residues, which are essential for ubiquitin-dependent degradation. Therefore, PT subunit A will not be metabolized like most other proteins.

PT is heat-stable and protease-resistant, but once the A and B are separated, these properties change. The B subunit will stay heat-stable at temperatures up to 60 °C, but it is susceptible to protein degradation. PT subunit A, on the other hand, is less susceptible to ubiquitin-dependent degradation, but is unstable at temperature of 37 °C. This facilitates unfolding of the protein in the ER and tricks the cell into transporting the A subunit to the cytosol, where normally unfolded proteins will be marked for degradation. So, the unfolded conformation will stimulate the ERAD-mediated translocation of PT A into the cytosol. Once in the cytosol, it can bind to NAD and form a stable, folded protein again. Being thermally unstable is also the Achilles heel of PT subunit A. As always, there is an equilibrium between the folded and unfolded states. When the protein is unfolded, it is susceptible to degradation by the 20S proteasome, which can degrade only unfolded proteins.

== PT and vaccines ==
Since the introduction of pertussis vaccines in the 1940s and 1950s, different genetic changes have been described surrounding the pertussis toxin.

=== Emergence of ptxP3 ===
ptxP is the pertussis toxin's promoter gene. There is a well documented emergence and global spread of ptxP3 strains evolving from and replacing the native ptxP1 strains, associated with an increased production of the toxin, and thus an increased virulence. Such spread has been documented in multiple countries, and sometimes but not always linked to the resurgence of pertussis in the end of the 20th century. Countries with a documented spread of ptxP3 include Australia, Denmark, Finland, Iran, Italy, Japan, the Netherlands, and Sweden.

== See also ==
- cyaA
