= ADCY8 =

Protein-coding gene in the species Homo sapiens

Identifiers
- Aliases: ADCY8, AC8, ADCY3, HBAC1, adenylate cyclase 8 (brain), adenylate cyclase 8
- External IDs: OMIM: 103070; MGI: 1341110; HomoloGene: 37443; GeneCards: ADCY8; OMA:ADCY8 - orthologs

Gene location (Mouse)
Chr.	Chromosome 15 (mouse)
Band	15 D1|15 29.03 cM	Start	64,568,933 bp
Band	15 D1|15 29.03 cM	End	64,794,145 bp
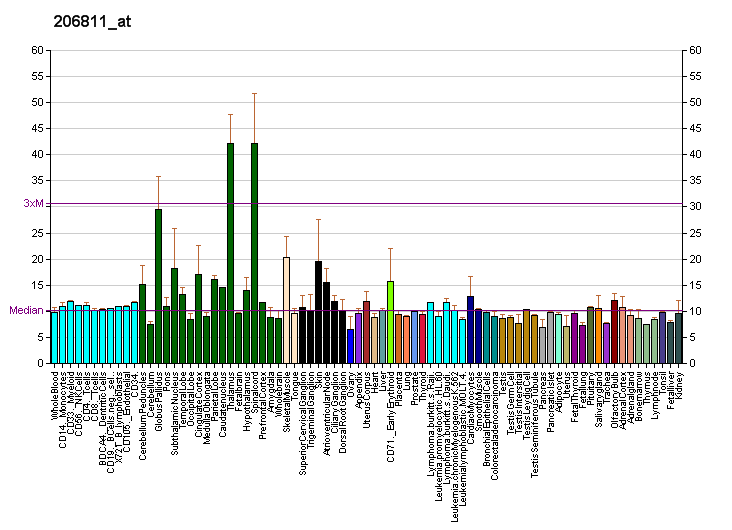
RNA expression pattern
Bgee	Human / Mouse (ortholog); Top expressed in: caput epididymis; inferior olivary nucleus; corpus epididymis; external globus pallidus; pons; amygdala; prefrontal cortex; cingulate gyrus; hypothalamus; substantia nigra / Top expressed in: ventral lateral nucleus; central medial nucleus; medial dorsal nucleus; medial geniculate nucleus; supraoptic nucleus; lateral geniculate nucleus; lumbar subsegment of spinal cord; ganglion cell layer; layer of neocortex; efferent ductule; More reference expression data
BioGPS	More reference expression data
Gene ontology
Molecular function	nucleotide binding; metal ion binding; lyase activity; adenylate cyclase activity; phosphorus-oxygen lyase activity; calcium- and calmodulin-responsive adenylate cyclase activity; ATP binding; guanylate cyclase activity; actin binding; calmodulin binding; protein homodimerization activity; protein heterodimerization activity; protein dimerization activity; protein phosphatase 2A binding
Cellular component	integral component of membrane; membrane; plasma membrane; guanylate cyclase complex, soluble; Schaffer collateral - CA1 synapse; hippocampal mossy fiber to CA3 synapse; glutamatergic synapse; integral component of presynaptic membrane; intracellular anatomical structure; integral component of plasma membrane; caveola; clathrin-coated pit; postsynaptic density; actin cytoskeleton; basolateral plasma membrane; apical plasma membrane; axon; dendrite; neuronal cell body membrane; plasma membrane raft; membrane raft; presynaptic active zone; excitatory synapse; cell junction; clathrin-coated vesicle membrane; cytoplasmic vesicle; presynaptic membrane; cell projection; synapse; postsynaptic membrane
Biological process	cAMP biosynthetic process; intracellular signal transduction; cellular response to glucagon stimulus; cyclic nucleotide biosynthetic process; long-term memory; renal water homeostasis; learning or memory; signal transduction; cGMP biosynthetic process; adenylate cyclase-activating G protein-coupled receptor signaling pathway; adenylate cyclase-inhibiting G protein-coupled receptor signaling pathway; G protein-coupled receptor signaling pathway; modulation of chemical synaptic transmission; positive regulation of cytosolic calcium ion concentration; memory; locomotory behavior; glucose mediated signaling pathway; positive regulation of synaptic plasticity; positive regulation of CREB transcription factor activity; activation of protein kinase A activity; positive regulation of insulin secretion involved in cellular response to glucose stimulus; G protein-coupled opioid receptor signaling pathway; glucose homeostasis; protein complex oligomerization; protein homooligomerization; regulation of cytosolic calcium ion concentration; cellular response to calcium ion; cellular response to morphine; cellular response to glucose stimulus; regulation of cellular response to stress; neuroinflammatory response; positive regulation of long-term synaptic potentiation; positive regulation of long-term synaptic depression; cellular response to forskolin; activation of adenylate cyclase activity
Sources:Amigo / QuickGO
Orthologs
Species	Human	Mouse
Entrez	114	11514
Ensembl	n/a	ENSMUSG00000022376
UniProt	P40145; Q4F7X0	P97490
RefSeq (mRNA)	NM_001115	NM_001291903; NM_009623; NM_001331075
RefSeq (protein)	NP_001106; NP_001106.1	NP_001278832; NP_001318004; NP_033753
Location (UCSC)	n/a	Chr 15: 64.57 – 64.79 Mb
PubMed search
- Wikidata
View/Edit Human	View/Edit Mouse

Adenylyl cyclase type 8 is an enzyme that in humans is encoded by the ADCY8 gene.

== Function ==
Adenylyl cyclase is a membrane bound enzyme that catalyses the formation of cyclic AMP from ATP. The enzymatic activity is under the control of several hormones, and different polypeptides participate in the transduction of the signal from the receptor to the catalytic moiety. Stimulatory or inhibitory receptors (R_{s} and R_{i}) interact with G proteins (G_{s} and G_{i}) that exhibit GTPase activity and they modulate the activity of the catalytic subunit of the adenylyl cyclase.
