= ADCY9 =

Protein-coding gene in the species Homo sapiens

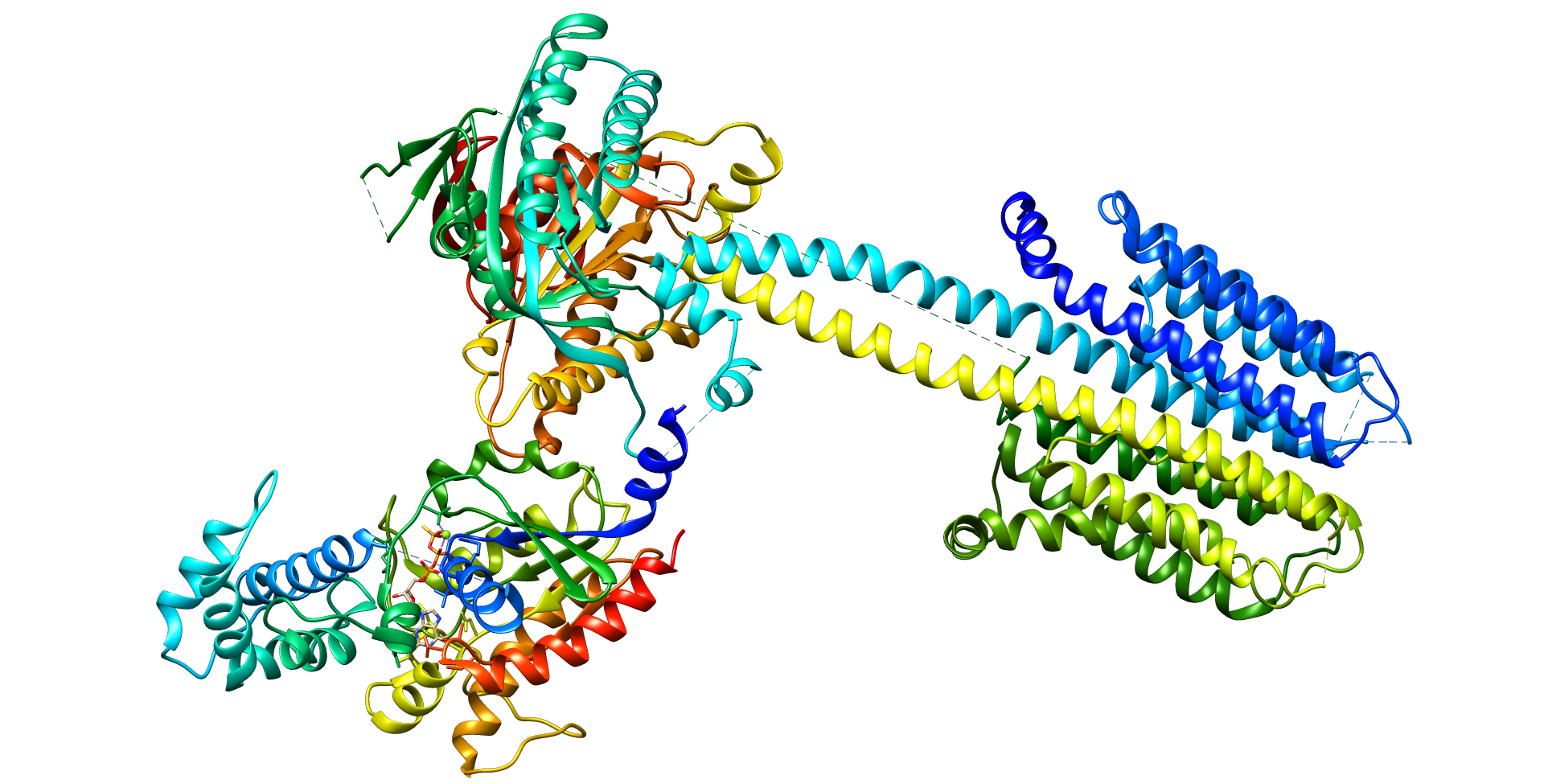

Identifiers
- Aliases: ADCY9, AC9, ACIX, adenylate cyclase 9
- External IDs: OMIM: 603302; MGI: 108450; HomoloGene: 868; GeneCards: ADCY9; OMA:ADCY9 - orthologs

Gene location (Human)
Chr.	Chromosome 16 (human)
Band	16p13.3	Start	3,953,387 bp
Band	16p13.3	End	4,116,442 bp

Gene location (Mouse)
Chr.	Chromosome 16 (mouse)
Band	16 A1|16 2.42 cM	Start	4,105,393 bp
Band	16 A1|16 2.42 cM	End	4,238,362 bp
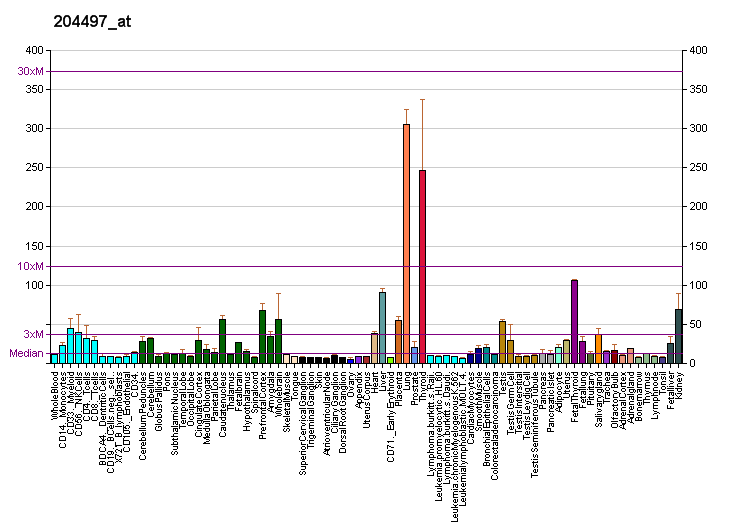

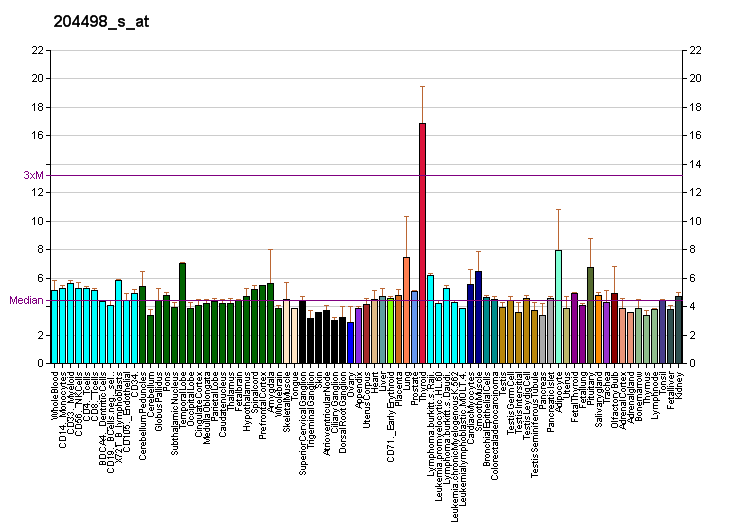
RNA expression pattern
Bgee	Human / Mouse (ortholog); Top expressed in: secondary oocyte; Epithelium of choroid plexus; vastus lateralis muscle; myocardium of left ventricle; gastrocnemius muscle; glutes; Skeletal muscle tissue of biceps brachii; parotid gland; deltoid muscle; endothelial cell / Top expressed in: CA3 field; Region I of hippocampus proper; triceps brachii muscle; sternocleidomastoid muscle; temporal muscle; primary motor cortex; dentate gyrus; vastus lateralis muscle; Rostral migratory stream; subiculum; More reference expression data
BioGPS	More reference expression data
Gene ontology
Molecular function	nucleotide binding; metal ion binding; lyase activity; phosphorus-oxygen lyase activity; ATP binding; adenylate cyclase activity; guanylate cyclase activity
Cellular component	membrane; integral component of plasma membrane; axon; dendrite; plasma membrane; integral component of membrane; guanylate cyclase complex, soluble; intracellular anatomical structure
Biological process	intracellular signal transduction; cellular response to glucagon stimulus; cyclic nucleotide biosynthetic process; adenylate cyclase-activating adrenergic receptor signaling pathway; renal water homeostasis; signal transduction; cAMP biosynthetic process; adenylate cyclase-activating G protein-coupled receptor signaling pathway; cGMP biosynthetic process; adenylate cyclase-inhibiting G protein-coupled receptor signaling pathway; G protein-coupled receptor signaling pathway; activation of adenylate cyclase activity; activation of protein kinase A activity
Sources:Amigo / QuickGO
Orthologs
Species	Human	Mouse
Entrez	115	11515
Ensembl	ENSG00000162104	ENSMUSG00000005580
UniProt	O60503	P51830
RefSeq (mRNA)	NM_001116	NM_001291910; NM_009624
RefSeq (protein)	NP_001107	NP_001278839; NP_033754
Location (UCSC)	Chr 16: 3.95 – 4.12 Mb	Chr 16: 4.11 – 4.24 Mb
PubMed search
- Wikidata
View/Edit Human	View/Edit Mouse

Adenylyl cyclase type 9 is an enzyme that in humans is encoded by the ADCY9 gene.

== Function ==
Adenylyl cyclase is a membrane bound enzyme that catalyses the formation of cyclic AMP from ATP. It is regulated by a family of G protein-coupled receptors, protein kinases, and calcium. The type 9 adenylyl cyclase is a widely distributed adenylyl cyclase, and it is stimulated by beta-adrenergic receptor activation but is insensitive to forskolin, calcium, and somatostatin.
