= GUCY1B1 =

Protein-coding gene in the species Homo sapiens

Identifiers
- Aliases: GUCY1B1, guanylate cyclase 1, soluble, beta 3, GUCSB3, guanylate cyclase 1 soluble subunit beta, GC-SB3, GUC1B3, GC-S-beta-1, guanylate cyclase 1 soluble subunit beta 1, GUCB3, GUCY1B3
- External IDs: OMIM: 139397; MGI: 1860604; GeneCards: GUCY1B1
Available structures
PDB	Ortholog search: PDBe RCSB
PDB	List of PDB id codes 2WZ1, 3UVJ, 4NI2
Enzyme activity
EC #	BRENDA	ExPASy	KEGG	MetaCyc
4.6.1.2	↗	↗	↗	↗

Gene location (Human)
Chr.	Chromosome 4 (human)
Band	4q32.1	Start	155,758,992 bp
Band	4q32.1	End	155,807,811 bp

Gene location (Mouse)
Chr.	Chromosome 3 (mouse)
Band	3|3 E3	Start	81,939,313 bp
Band	3|3 E3	End	81,981,996 bp
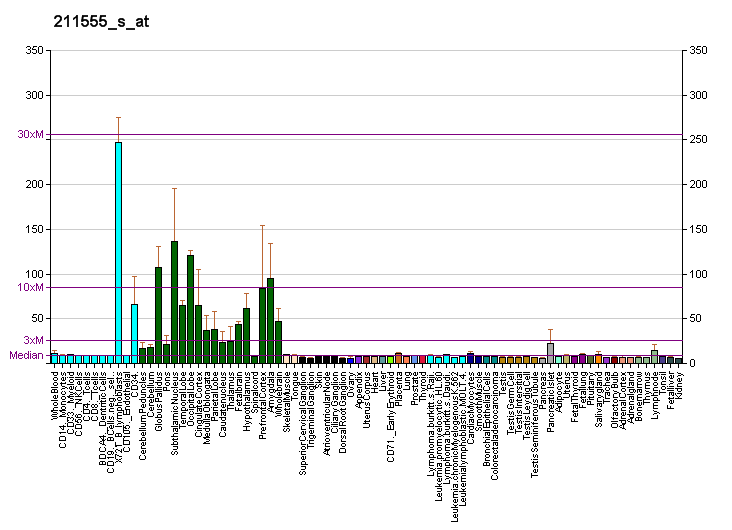
RNA expression pattern
Bgee	Human / Mouse (ortholog); Top expressed in: middle temporal gyrus; orbitofrontal cortex; lateral nuclear group of thalamus; superior frontal gyrus; Brodmann area 46; postcentral gyrus; Brodmann area 23; pars compacta; pons; entorhinal cortex / Top expressed in: olfactory tubercle; habenula; lateral septal nucleus; anterior amygdaloid area; globus pallidus; left lung lobe; ventromedial nucleus; dorsomedial hypothalamic nucleus; dorsal tegmental nucleus; mammillary body; More reference expression data
BioGPS	More reference expression data
Gene ontology
Molecular function	nucleotide binding; guanylate cyclase activity; GTP binding; metal ion binding; protein binding; heme binding; lyase activity; phosphorus-oxygen lyase activity; signaling receptor activity; adenylate cyclase activity
Cellular component	plasma membrane; guanylate cyclase complex, soluble; cytoplasm; presynaptic active zone
Biological process	intracellular signal transduction; cyclic nucleotide biosynthetic process; blood circulation; nitric oxide-cGMP-mediated signaling pathway; cGMP biosynthetic process; nitric oxide mediated signal transduction; cellular response to nitric oxide; cGMP-mediated signaling; trans-synaptic signaling by nitric oxide, modulating synaptic transmission
Sources:Amigo / QuickGO
Orthologs
Databases	NCBI: entry; OMA: entry
Species	Human	Mouse
Entrez	2983	54195
Ensembl	ENSG00000061918	ENSMUSG00000028005
UniProt	Q02153	O54865
RefSeq (mRNA)	NM_000857; NM_001291951; NM_001291952; NM_001291953; NM_001291954 NM_001291955	NM_001161796; NM_017469
RefSeq (protein)	NP_000848; NP_001278880; NP_001278881; NP_001278882; NP_001278883 NP_001278884	NP_001155268; NP_059497
Location (UCSC)	Chr 4: 155.76 – 155.81 Mb	Chr 3: 81.94 – 81.98 Mb
PubMed search
- Wikidata
View/Edit Human	View/Edit Mouse

Guanylate cyclase soluble subunit beta-1 is an enzyme that in humans is encoded by the GUCY1B1 gene (previously GUCY1B3).

== Function ==
Soluble guanylate cyclase (sGC), a heterodimeric protein consisting of an alpha and a beta subunit, catalyzes the conversion of GTP to the second messenger cGMP and functions as the main receptor for nitric oxide and nitrovasodilator drugs.

== Interactions ==
GUCY1B1 has been shown to interact with Heat shock protein 90kDa alpha (cytosolic), member A1 and Endothelial NOS.
