= TRNT1 =

Protein-coding gene in the species Homo sapiens

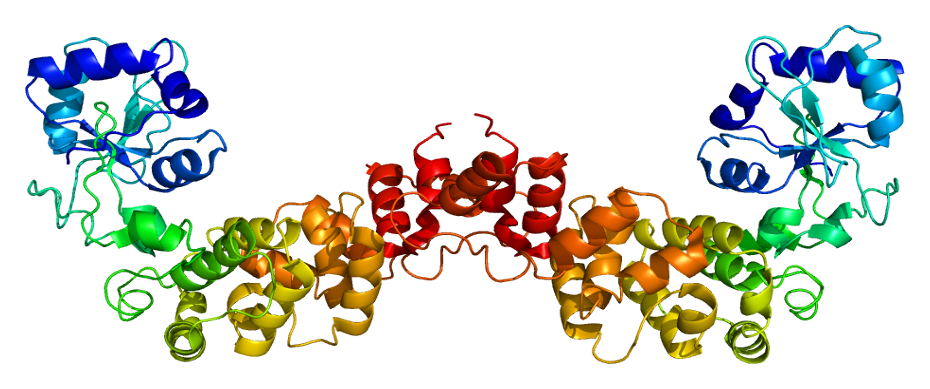

Identifiers
- Aliases: TRNT1, CCA1, MtCCA, CGI-47, SIFD, tRNA nucleotidyl transferase 1, RPEM
- External IDs: OMIM: 612907; MGI: 1917297; GeneCards: TRNT1
Available structures
PDB	Ortholog search: PDBe RCSB
PDB	List of PDB id codes 1OU5, 4X4W
Enzyme activity
EC #	BRENDA	ExPASy	KEGG	MetaCyc
2.7.7.72	↗	↗	↗	↗

Gene location (Human)
Chr.	Chromosome 3 (human)
Band	3p26.2	Start	3,126,916 bp
Band	3p26.2	End	3,150,879 bp

Gene location (Mouse)
Chr.	Chromosome 6 (mouse)
Band	6|6 E1	Start	106,746,081 bp
Band	6|6 E1	End	106,759,435 bp
RNA expression pattern
Bgee	Human / Mouse (ortholog); Top expressed in: endothelial cell; secondary oocyte; gonad; Achilles tendon; parietal pleura; epithelium of colon; pancreatic epithelial cell; cartilage tissue; metanephros; testicle / Top expressed in: spermatocyte; zygote; spermatid; genital tubercle; secondary oocyte; tail of embryo; yolk sac; ventricular zone; embryo; atrioventricular valve; More reference expression data
BioGPS	n/a
Gene ontology
Molecular function	CTP:3'-cytidine-tRNA cytidylyltransferase activity; transferase activity; nucleotide binding; tRNA binding; nucleotidyltransferase activity; ATP binding; CTP:tRNA cytidylyltransferase activity; RNA binding; 5'-3' RNA polymerase activity; ATP:3'-cytidine-cytidine-tRNA adenylyltransferase activity
Cellular component	mitochondrial matrix; intracellular anatomical structure; mitochondrion; nucleoplasm
Biological process	RNA processing; tRNA 3'-terminal CCA addition; tRNA processing; tRNA 3'-end processing; mitochondrial tRNA 3'-end processing
Sources:Amigo / QuickGO
Orthologs
Databases	NCBI: entry; OMA: entry
Species	Human	Mouse
Entrez	51095	70047
Ensembl	ENSG00000072756	ENSMUSG00000013736
UniProt	Q96Q11	Q8K1J6
RefSeq (mRNA)	NM_001302946; NM_016000; NM_182916	NM_001242358; NM_001242360; NM_027296
RefSeq (protein)	NP_001289875; NP_886552; NP_001354250; NP_001354251; NP_001354252	NP_001229287; NP_001229289; NP_081572
Location (UCSC)	Chr 3: 3.13 – 3.15 Mb	Chr 6: 106.75 – 106.76 Mb
PubMed search
- Wikidata
View/Edit Human	View/Edit Mouse

tRNA-nucleotidyltransferase 1, is an enzyme that in humans is encoded by the TRNT1 gene. This enzyme adds the nucleotide sequence CCA to the 3' end of tRNA, using ATP and CTP as substrates. The sequence creates the binding site for an amino acid.
