= CCA tRNA nucleotidyltransferase =

Enzyme

Identifiers
- EC no.: 2.7.7.72

Databases
- IntEnz: IntEnz view
- BRENDA: BRENDA entry
- ExPASy: NiceZyme view
- KEGG: KEGG entry
- MetaCyc: metabolic pathway
- PRIAM: profile
- PDB structures: RCSB PDB PDBe PDBsum
Search
- PMC: articles
- PubMed: articles
- NCBI: proteins

CCA tRNA nucleotidyltransferase (EC 2.7.7.72, CCA-adding enzyme, tRNA adenylyltransferase, tRNA CCA-pyrophosphorylase, tRNA-nucleotidyltransferase, transfer-RNA nucleotidyltransferase, transfer ribonucleic acid nucleotidyl transferase, CTP(ATP):tRNA nucleotidyltransferase, transfer ribonucleate adenylyltransferase, transfer ribonucleate adenyltransferase, transfer RNA adenylyltransferase, transfer ribonucleate nucleotidyltransferase, ATP (CTP):tRNA nucleotidyltransferase, ribonucleic cytidylic cytidylic adenylic pyrophosphorylase, transfer ribonucleic adenylyl (cytidylyl) transferase, transfer ribonucleic-terminal trinucleotide nucleotidyltransferase, transfer ribonucleate cytidylyltransferase, ribonucleic cytidylyltransferase, -C-C-A pyrophosphorylase, ATP(CTP)-tRNA nucleotidyltransferase, tRNA adenylyl(cytidylyl)transferase, CTP:tRNA cytidylyltransferase) is an enzyme with systematic name CTP,CTP,ATP:tRNA cytidylyl,cytidylyl,adenylyltransferase. This enzyme catalyses the following chemical reaction

a tRNA precursor + 2 CTP + ATP $\rightleftharpoons$ a tRNA with a 3' CCA end + 3 diphosphate (overall reaction)
(1a) a tRNA precursor + CTP $\rightleftharpoons$ a tRNA with a 3' cytidine end + diphosphate
(1b) a tRNA with a 3' cytidine + CTP $\rightleftharpoons$ a tRNA with a 3' CC end + diphosphate
(1c) a tRNA with a 3' CC end + ATP $\rightleftharpoons$ a tRNA with a 3' CCA end + diphosphate

The acylation of all tRNAs with an amino acid occurs at the terminal ribose of a 3' CCA sequence.

== See also ==
- TRNT1
