= ADCY4 =

Protein-coding gene in the species Homo sapiens

Identifiers
- Aliases: ADCY4, AC4, adenylate cyclase 4
- External IDs: OMIM: 600292; MGI: 99674; HomoloGene: 23149; GeneCards: ADCY4; OMA:ADCY4 - orthologs

Gene location (Human)
Chr.	Chromosome 14 (human)
Band	14q12	Start	24,318,349 bp
Band	14q12	End	24,335,093 bp

Gene location (Mouse)
Chr.	Chromosome 14 (mouse)
Band	14|14 C3	Start	56,006,514 bp
Band	14|14 C3	End	56,021,552 bp
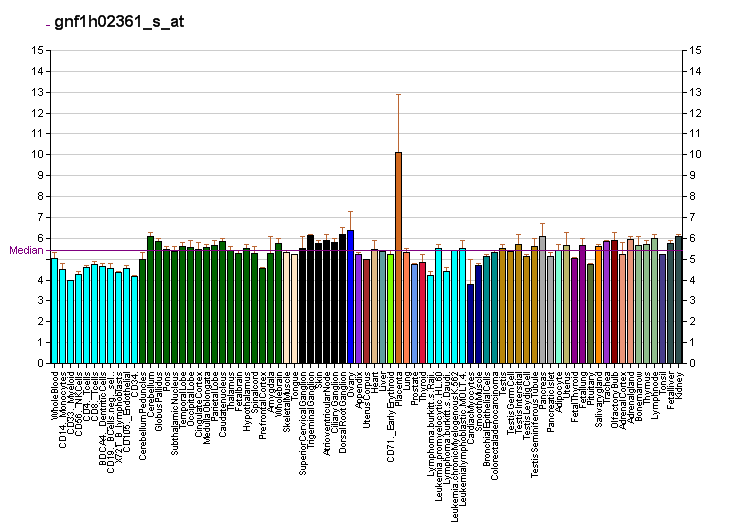
RNA expression pattern
Bgee	Human / Mouse (ortholog); Top expressed in: apex of heart; subcutaneous adipose tissue; left uterine tube; right lung; body of uterus; left ventricle; lactiferous gland; myometrium; right lobe of thyroid gland; canal of the cervix / Top expressed in: external carotid artery; internal carotid artery; right lung; lactiferous gland; right lung lobe; left lung; muscle of thigh; left lung lobe; yolk sac; carotid body; More reference expression data
BioGPS	More reference expression data
Gene ontology
Molecular function	nucleotide binding; metal ion binding; protein binding; lyase activity; phosphorus-oxygen lyase activity; ATP binding; guanylate cyclase activity; protein kinase C binding; adenylate cyclase activity
Cellular component	cytoplasm; integral component of membrane; membrane; plasma membrane; intracellular anatomical structure; dendrite; guanylate cyclase complex, soluble; integral component of plasma membrane
Biological process	intracellular signal transduction; adenylate cyclase-modulating G protein-coupled receptor signaling pathway; cellular response to glucagon stimulus; cyclic nucleotide biosynthetic process; renal water homeostasis; cAMP biosynthetic process; cGMP biosynthetic process; signal transduction; adenylate cyclase-activating G protein-coupled receptor signaling pathway; adenylate cyclase-inhibiting G protein-coupled receptor signaling pathway; G protein-coupled receptor signaling pathway; activation of adenylate cyclase activity; activation of protein kinase A activity
Sources:Amigo / QuickGO
Orthologs
Species	Human	Mouse
Entrez	196883	104110
Ensembl	ENSG00000129467; ENSG00000284814	ENSMUSG00000022220
UniProt	Q8NFM4	Q91WF3
RefSeq (mRNA)	NM_139247; NM_001198568; NM_001198592	NM_080435; NM_001361604
RefSeq (protein)	NP_001185497; NP_001185521; NP_640340	NP_536683; NP_001348533
Location (UCSC)	Chr 14: 24.32 – 24.34 Mb	Chr 14: 56.01 – 56.02 Mb
PubMed search
- Wikidata
View/Edit Human	View/Edit Mouse

Adenylyl cyclase type 4 is an enzyme that in humans is encoded by the ADCY4 gene.

== Function ==
This gene encodes a member of the family of adenylyl cyclases, which are membrane-associated enzymes that catalyze the formation of the secondary messenger cyclic adenosine monophosphate (cAMP). Mouse studies show that adenylyl cyclase 4, along with adenylyl cyclases 2 and 3, is expressed in olfactory cilia, suggesting that several different adenylyl cyclases may couple to olfactory receptors and that there may be multiple receptor-mediated mechanisms for the generation of cAMP signals.
