= ADCY10 =

Protein found in humans

Identifiers
- Aliases: ADCY10, HCA2, SAC, SACI, Sacy, hsAC, HEL-S-7a, adenylate cyclase 10 (soluble), adenylate cyclase 10, soluble, adenylate cyclase 10
- External IDs: OMIM: 605205; MGI: 2660854; GeneCards: ADCY10
Available structures
PDB	Ortholog search: PDBe RCSB
PDB	List of PDB id codes 4CLK, 4CLL, 4CLP, 4CLS, 4CLT, 4CLU, 4CLW, 4CLY, 4CLZ, 4CM0, 4CM2, 4OYA, 4OYB, 4OYI, 4OYM, 4OYO, 4OYP, 4OYW, 4OYX, 4OYZ, 4OZ2, 4OZ3, 4UST, 4USU, 4USV, 4USW, 5D0R
Enzyme activity
EC #	BRENDA	ExPASy	KEGG	MetaCyc
4.6.1.1	↗	↗	↗	↗

Gene location (Human)
Chr.	Chromosome 1 (human)
Band	1q24.2	Start	167,809,386 bp
Band	1q24.2	End	167,914,215 bp

Gene location (Mouse)
Chr.	Chromosome 1 (mouse)
Band	1|1 H2.3	Start	165,312,752 bp
Band	1|1 H2.3	End	165,404,343 bp
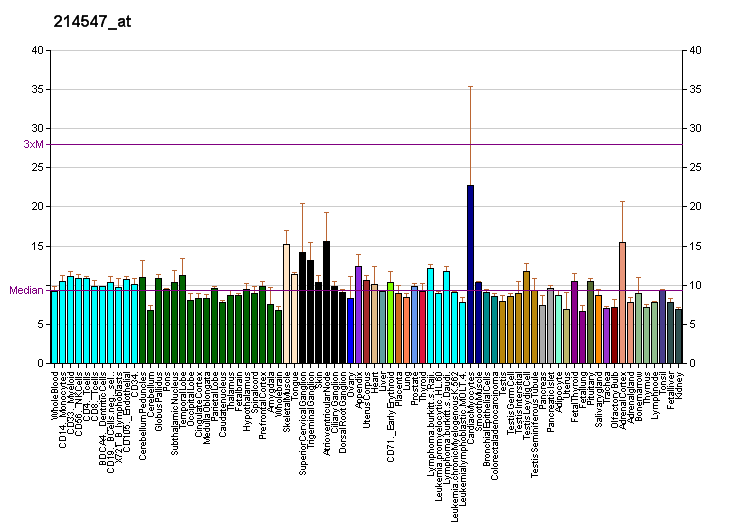

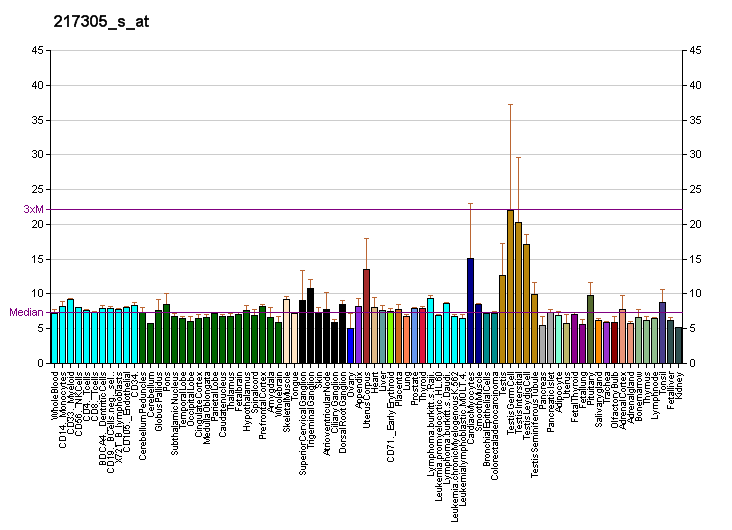
RNA expression pattern
Bgee	Human / Mouse (ortholog); Top expressed in: sperm; left testis; right testis; buccal mucosa cell; right lobe of liver; testicle; gonad; cerebellar hemisphere; right hemisphere of cerebellum; mucosa of transverse colon / Top expressed in: spermatid; spermatocyte; seminiferous tubule; embryo; embryo; granulocyte; morula; blastocyst; zygote; lumbar subsegment of spinal cord; More reference expression data
BioGPS	More reference expression data
Gene ontology
Molecular function	nucleotide binding; manganese ion binding; metal ion binding; lyase activity; adenylate cyclase activity; phosphorus-oxygen lyase activity; bicarbonate binding; ATP binding; magnesium ion binding; ATPase binding
Cellular component	cytoplasm; cytosol; cell projection; membrane; microtubule cytoskeleton; growth cone; basal part of cell; plasma membrane; apical part of cell; cilium; axon; soma; dendrite; mitochondrion; perinuclear region of cytoplasm; motile cilium; cytoskeleton; nucleus; apical plasma membrane; extracellular region
Biological process	cellular response to inorganic substance; intracellular signal transduction; epithelial cilium movement involved in extracellular fluid movement; cyclic nucleotide biosynthetic process; spermatogenesis; positive regulation of apoptotic process; cAMP biosynthetic process
Sources:Amigo / QuickGO
Orthologs
Databases	NCBI: entry; OMA: entry
Species	Human	Mouse
Entrez	55811	271639
Ensembl	ENSG00000143199	ENSMUSG00000026567
UniProt	Q96PN6	Q8C0T9
RefSeq (mRNA)	NM_001167749; NM_001297772; NM_018417	NM_173029; NM_001357427
RefSeq (protein)	NP_001161221; NP_001284701; NP_060887	NP_766617; NP_001344356
Location (UCSC)	Chr 1: 167.81 – 167.91 Mb	Chr 1: 165.31 – 165.4 Mb
PubMed search
- Wikidata
View/Edit Human	View/Edit Mouse

Adenylyl cyclase 10 also known as ADCY10 is an enzyme that, in humans, is encoded by the ADCY10 gene.

== Function ==
The protein encoded by this gene belongs to a distinct class of mammalian adenylyl cyclase that is soluble and insensitive to G protein or forskolin regulation. It is localized in the cytoplasm and is thought to function as a general bicarbonate sensor throughout the body. It may also play an important role in the generation of cAMP in spermatozoa, implying possible roles in sperm maturation through the epididymis, capacitation, hypermotility, and/or the acrosome reaction.

== Clinical significance ==
Mutations in the ADCY10 gene are associated with an increased risk of adsorptive hypercalciuria and male infertility.
