= Soluble guanylyl cyclase =

Enzyme is involved in vasodilation

Guanylate cyclase
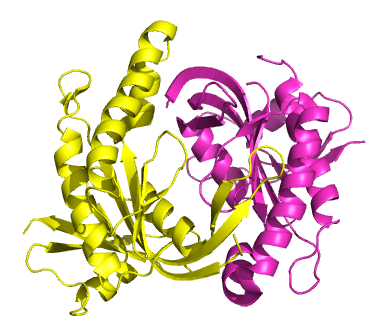
- catalytic domain of human soluble guanylate cyclase 1. PDB 3uvj

Identifiers
- EC no.: 4.6.1.2
- CAS no.: 9054-75-5
- Alt. names: Guanyl cyclase, Guanylyl cyclase

Databases
- BRENDA: enzyme data
- ExPASy: NiceZyme view
- KEGG: enzyme entry
- MetaCyc: metabolic pathway
- Rhea: reactions
- PDB structures: RCSB PDB PDBe PDBsum
- Gene Ontology: AmiGO / QuickGO
Search
- PMC: articles
- PubMed: articles
- NCBI: proteins

Soluble guanylyl cyclase (sGC) is one of the gasoreceptors for nitric oxide, NO. It is soluble, i.e. completely intracellular. Most notably, this enzyme is involved in vasodilation. In humans, it is encoded by the genes GUCY1A2, GUCY1A3, GUCY1B2 and GUCY1B3.

It is classified under EC number 4.6.1.2.

== Structure ==
sGC is a heterodimer composed of one alpha (1, 2) and one heme-binding beta (1, 2) subunits. Each subunit consists of four domains: an N-terminal HNOX domain, a PAS-like domain, a coiled-coil domain, and a C-terminal catalytic domain. The mammalian enzyme contains one heme per dimer, with a proximal histidine ligand located in the HNOX domain of the beta 1 subunit. In its Fe(II) form, this heme moiety is the target of nitric oxide, which is synthesized by endothelial cells following appropriate stimulation. Binding of nitric oxide to the heme results in activation of the C-terminal catalytic domain, which produces cGMP from GTP.

The HNOX (Heme Nitric oxide/OXygen binding) domain of the beta subunit of sGC contains the prosthetic heme group, and is part of a family of related sensor proteins found throughout a wide range of organisms. The HNOX domain uses the bound heme to sense gaseous ligands such as nitric oxide, oxygen, and/or possibly carbon monoxide. While the HNOX domain of sGC has no available structure, several bacterial HNOX domains have been crystallized (pdb codes 1U55, 1XBN, 2O09 and others).

sGC also contains a PAS type regulatory domain. Named after the first three proteins in which it was found (Period clock protein, ARNT protein, and Single minded protein) the PAS domain is a sensor domain that has been found in a large variety of proteins, and can work in conjunction with a variety of prosthetic groups as a sensor for a variety of conditions, including light, oxidative stress, or diatomic gases. In the case of sGC, the PAS domain mediates heterodimer formation and may play a role in signal propagation from the HNOX domain to the catalytic guanylate cyclase domain. While the PAS domain of sGC has no available structure, the PAS domain of a protein with high sequence homology to sGC has been crystallized (pdb code 2P04).

The PAS domain of sGC is followed by an extended coiled-coil region, which contains a segment called a Signaling helix, which is found in a variety of signaling proteins. The crystal structure of the coiled-coil region of the sGC beta subunit has been determined (pdb code 3HLS).

The 250-residue guanylate cyclase domain at the C-terminus of sGC is highly conserved in soluble and membrane bound guanylyl cyclases, and shares significant homology with the catalytic domains of many adenylyl cyclases. In 2008, the first structures of a bacterial guanylate cyclase domain (pdb code 2W01) and a sGC guanylate cyclase catalytic domain (pdb code 3ET6) were reported. In late 2009, the crystal structure of a human guanylate cyclase catalytic domain, that of the beta subunit, was reported (pdb code 2WZ1).

The complete structure of the assembled domains of sGC remains to be determined.

== Regulation ==
NO leads to at least 200 fold increase in sGC activity. Because nitric oxide has a partially filled pi* orbital, back bonding prefers a bent geometry for the heme-NO complex. NO has a strong trans effect, in which the histidine-iron bond is weakened when NO binding delocalizes electrons to the dz2 orbital toward the axial ligand. Thus nitric oxide binding ferrous heme at the distal position gives a His-Fe-NO complex that dissociates to a 5-coordinate Fe-NO complex. However, the identification of two distinct [NO] dependent processes in sGC activation has led to speculation that a proximal NO is responsible for histidine displacement, giving an intermediate 6-coordinate NO-Fe-NO complex. Depending on product concentration, the intermediate can then dissociate either to one of two 5-coordinate forms, the more active distally NO ligated form, or the less active proximally NO ligated form. An alternative hypothesis states that a second, non-heme binding site accounts for the second NO dependent activation process to give the fully active enzyme.

Under conditions of oxidative stress, Fe(II)sGC can be oxidized and lose its heme. Heme-free (apo-sGC) no longer responds to NO, but does respond to so-called sGC activator compounds. The latter bind to the empty heme pocket and activate the enzyme in a similar manner to the activation of Fe(II)sGC by NO.

In addition, sGC contains an allosteric site, to which sGC stimulators bind. They potentiate NO-sGC signalling, so that sub-maximally active concentrations of NO reach a maximal activation of sGC. On their own, sGC stimulators have only a marginal effect on sGC.

As NO can bind to heme, whether NO can compete with O_{2} gasoreceptors is unclear.

== As drug target ==
Riociguat (trade name Adempas) was the first drug of a novel class of sGC stimulators, which treat two forms of pulmonary hypertension (PH): chronic thromboembolic pulmonary hypertension (CTEPH) and pulmonary arterial hypertension (PAH).

Cinaciguat was another sGC stimulator that failed to demonstrate effectiveness in clinical trials for acute decompensated heart failure due to a high incidence of treatment induced hypotensive events requiring emergency intervention.

Vericiguat (Verquvo) was approved for medical use in the United States in January 2021.

== See also ==
- Gas sensor
