= GUCY1A1 =

Protein-coding gene in the species Homo sapiens

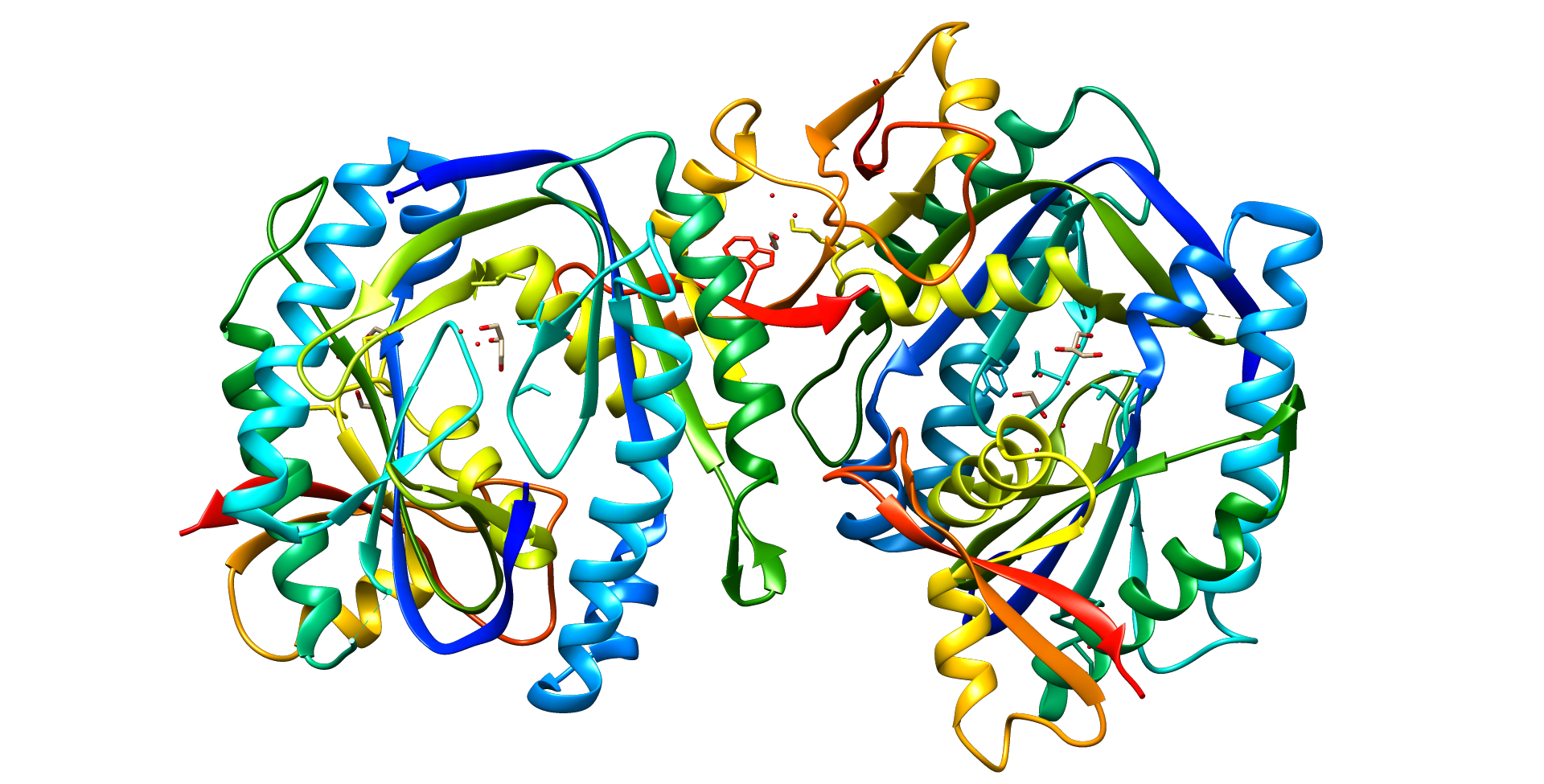

Identifiers
- Aliases: GUCY1A1, MYMY6, GC-SA3, GUCY1A3, GUCSA3, guanylate cyclase 1 soluble subunit alpha, guanylate cyclase 1 soluble subunit alpha 1, guanylate cyclase 1, soluble, alpha 3, GUC1A3, GUCA3
- External IDs: OMIM: 139396; MGI: 1926562; GeneCards: GUCY1A1
Available structures
PDB	Ortholog search: PDBe RCSB
PDB	List of PDB id codes 3UVJ, 4NI2
Enzyme activity
EC #	BRENDA	ExPASy	KEGG	MetaCyc
4.6.1.2	↗	↗	↗	↗

Gene location (Human)
Chr.	Chromosome 4 (human)
Band	4q32.1	Start	155,666,711 bp
Band	4q32.1	End	155,732,349 bp

Gene location (Mouse)
Chr.	Chromosome 3 (mouse)
Band	3|3 E3	Start	81,999,734 bp
Band	3|3 E3	End	82,053,096 bp
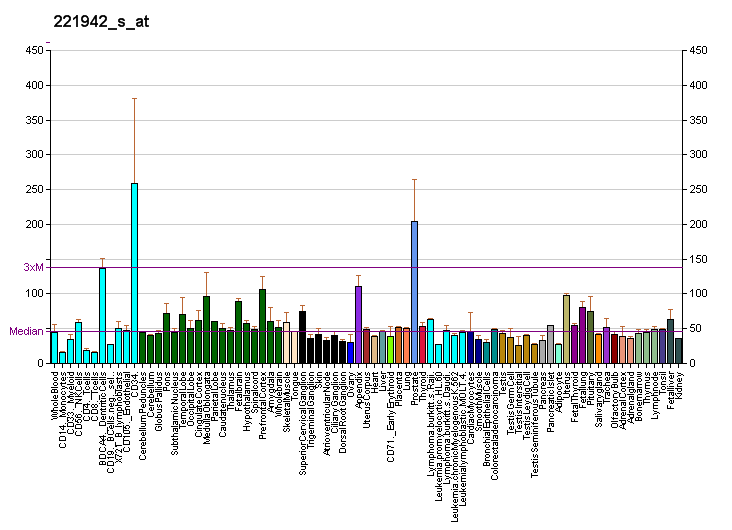
RNA expression pattern
Bgee	Human / Mouse (ortholog); Top expressed in: urethra; vena cava; saphenous vein; visceral pleura; myocardium; right ventricle; superficial temporal artery; lower lobe of lung; lactiferous duct; middle temporal gyrus / Top expressed in: olfactory tubercle; left lung lobe; habenula; Gonadal ridge; ascending aorta; aortic valve; nucleus accumbens; atrium; atrioventricular valve; right lung lobe; More reference expression data
BioGPS	More reference expression data
Gene ontology
Molecular function	nucleotide binding; guanylate cyclase activity; GTP binding; protein binding; heme binding; lyase activity; phosphorus-oxygen lyase activity; signaling receptor activity; adenylate cyclase activity
Cellular component	cytoplasm; plasma membrane; guanylate cyclase complex, soluble; glutamatergic synapse; GABA-ergic synapse
Biological process	intracellular signal transduction; cyclic nucleotide biosynthetic process; blood circulation; regulation of blood pressure; cGMP biosynthetic process; relaxation of vascular associated smooth muscle; nitric oxide mediated signal transduction; positive regulation of nitric oxide mediated signal transduction; retrograde trans-synaptic signaling by nitric oxide, modulating synaptic transmission
Sources:Amigo / QuickGO
Orthologs
Databases	NCBI: entry; OMA: entry
Species	Human	Mouse
Entrez	2982	60596
Ensembl	ENSG00000164116	ENSMUSG00000033910
UniProt	Q02108; Q6PJR4	Q9ERL9
RefSeq (mRNA)	NM_000856; NM_001130682; NM_001130683; NM_001130684; NM_001130685 NM_001130686; NM_001130687; NM_001256449	NM_021896; NM_001356987; NM_001356988
RefSeq (protein)	NP_000847; NP_001124154; NP_001124155; NP_001124156; NP_001124157 NP_001124159; NP_001243378; NP_001366595; NP_001366596; NP_001366597; NP_001366598; NP_001366599; NP_001366600; NP_001366601; NP_001366602; NP_001366603; NP_001366604; NP_001366605	NP_068696; NP_001343916; NP_001343917
Location (UCSC)	Chr 4: 155.67 – 155.73 Mb	Chr 3: 82 – 82.05 Mb
PubMed search
- Wikidata
View/Edit Human	View/Edit Mouse

Guanylate cyclase soluble subunit alpha-1 is an enzyme that in humans is encoded by the GUCY1A1 gene (previously GUCY1A3).

== Function ==
Soluble guanylate cyclase (sGC), a heterodimeric protein consisting of an alpha and a beta subunit, catalyzes the conversion of GTP to the second messenger cGMP and functions as the main receptor for nitric oxide and nitrovasodilator drugs. Mutations in this gene have been associated to cases of myocardial infarction (10.1038/nature12722).
