= ADCY7 =

Protein-coding gene in the species Homo sapiens

Identifiers
- Aliases: ADCY7, AC7, adenylate cyclase 7
- External IDs: OMIM: 600385; MGI: 102891; GeneCards: ADCY7
Enzyme activity
EC #	BRENDA	ExPASy	KEGG	MetaCyc
2.7.7.85	↗	↗	↗	↗
4.6.1.1	↗	↗	↗	↗

Gene location (Human)
Chr.	Chromosome 16 (human)
Band	16q12.1	Start	50,246,137 bp
Band	16q12.1	End	50,318,135 bp

Gene location (Mouse)
Chr.	Chromosome 8 (mouse)
Band	8 C3|8 43.06 cM	Start	88,999,031 bp
Band	8 C3|8 43.06 cM	End	89,056,590 bp
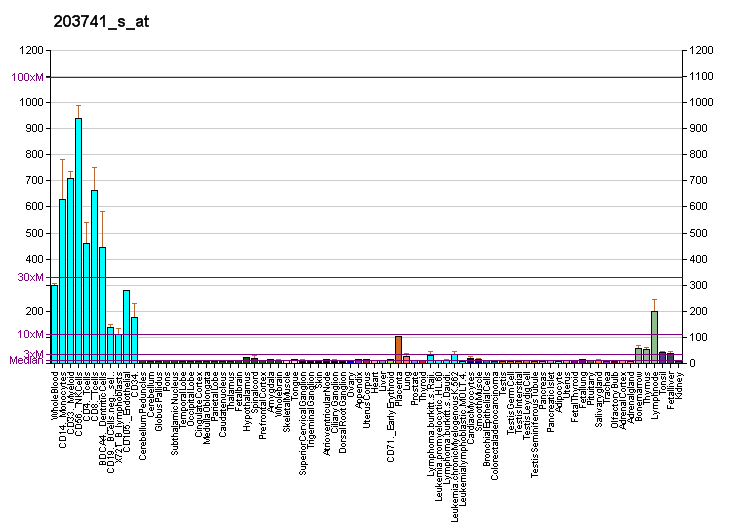
RNA expression pattern
Bgee	Human / Mouse (ortholog); Top expressed in: granulocyte; monocyte; blood; appendix; secondary oocyte; lymph node; bone marrow cell; spleen; skin of hip; gallbladder / Top expressed in: ascending aorta; aortic valve; tunica media of zone of aorta; mesenteric lymph nodes; Paneth cell; carotid body; blood; fetal liver hematopoietic progenitor cell; substantia nigra; Gonadal ridge; More reference expression data
BioGPS	More reference expression data
Gene ontology
Molecular function	adenylate cyclase activity; ATP binding; phosphorus-oxygen lyase activity; metal ion binding; nucleotide binding; lyase activity; guanylate cyclase activity
Cellular component	integral component of membrane; membrane; plasma membrane; guanylate cyclase complex, soluble; intracellular anatomical structure; integral component of plasma membrane
Biological process	renal water homeostasis; intracellular signal transduction; cellular response to ethanol; cellular response to glucagon stimulus; cyclic nucleotide biosynthetic process; maternal process involved in female pregnancy; cGMP biosynthetic process; signal transduction; adenylate cyclase-inhibiting G protein-coupled receptor signaling pathway; G protein-coupled receptor signaling pathway; cAMP biosynthetic process; adenylate cyclase-activating G protein-coupled receptor signaling pathway; regulation of adaptive immune response; cellular response to lithium ion; negative regulation of cytokine production involved in inflammatory response; activation of adenylate cyclase activity; activation of protein kinase A activity
Sources:Amigo / QuickGO
Orthologs
Databases	NCBI: entry; OMA: entry
Species	Human	Mouse
Entrez	113	11513
Ensembl	ENSG00000121281	ENSMUSG00000031659
UniProt	P51828	P51829
RefSeq (mRNA)	NM_001114; NM_001286057	NM_001037723; NM_001037724; NM_001109756; NM_007406
RefSeq (protein)	NP_001105; NP_001272986	NP_001032812; NP_001032813; NP_001103226; NP_031432
Location (UCSC)	Chr 16: 50.25 – 50.32 Mb	Chr 8: 89 – 89.06 Mb
PubMed search
- Wikidata
View/Edit Human	View/Edit Mouse

Adenylyl cyclase type 7 is an enzyme that in humans is encoded by the ADCY7 gene.

== Function ==
This gene encodes a membrane-bound adenylyl cyclase that catalyses the formation of cyclic AMP from ATP and is inhibitable by calcium. The product of this gene is a member of the adenylyl cyclase class-4/guanylyl cyclase enzyme family that is characterized by the presence of twelve membrane-spanning domains in its sequences.
