= ADCY1 =

Protein-coding gene in the species Homo sapiens

Identifiers
- Aliases: ADCY1, AC1, DFNB44, adenylate cyclase 1 (brain), adenylate cyclase 1
- External IDs: OMIM: 103072; MGI: 99677; HomoloGene: 41419; GeneCards: ADCY1; OMA:ADCY1 - orthologs

Gene location (Human)
Chr.	Chromosome 7 (human)
Band	7p12.3	Start	45,574,140 bp
Band	7p12.3	End	45,723,116 bp

Gene location (Mouse)
Chr.	Chromosome 11 (mouse)
Band	11 A1|11 4.72 cM	Start	7,013,489 bp
Band	11 A1|11 4.72 cM	End	7,128,506 bp
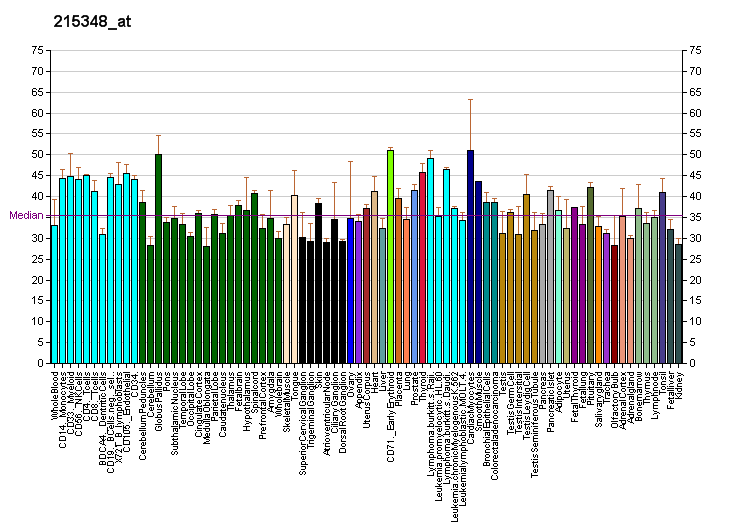
RNA expression pattern
Bgee	Human / Mouse (ortholog); Top expressed in: middle temporal gyrus; Brodmann area 23; orbitofrontal cortex; postcentral gyrus; superior frontal gyrus; Brodmann area 46; entorhinal cortex; occipital lobe; primary visual cortex; cerebellar vermis / Top expressed in: lobe of cerebellum; cerebellar vermis; prefrontal cortex; primary motor cortex; hippocampus proper; lateral geniculate nucleus; dentate gyrus; medial dorsal nucleus; medial geniculate nucleus; dentate gyrus of hippocampal formation granule cell; More reference expression data
BioGPS	More reference expression data
Gene ontology
Molecular function	nucleotide binding; metal ion binding; calmodulin binding; lyase activity; phosphorus-oxygen lyase activity; ATP binding; adenylate cyclase activity; guanylate cyclase activity; calcium- and calmodulin-responsive adenylate cyclase activity
Cellular component	cytoplasm; integral component of membrane; membrane; plasma membrane; integral component of plasma membrane; membrane raft; extracellular exosome; nucleus; guanylate cyclase complex, soluble; postsynaptic density; Schaffer collateral - CA1 synapse; hippocampal mossy fiber to CA3 synapse; glutamatergic synapse; integral component of postsynaptic density membrane
Biological process	cellular response to calcium ion; activation of protein kinase A activity; intracellular signal transduction; cellular response to forskolin; axonogenesis; rhythmic process; cellular response to glucagon stimulus; cyclic nucleotide biosynthetic process; response to lithium ion; long-term memory; regulation of circadian rhythm; circadian rhythm; renal water homeostasis; activation of adenylate cyclase activity; cAMP biosynthetic process; cGMP biosynthetic process; signal transduction; adenylate cyclase-activating G protein-coupled receptor signaling pathway; adenylate cyclase-inhibiting G protein-coupled receptor signaling pathway; cAMP-mediated signaling; G protein-coupled receptor signaling pathway; brain development; positive regulation of CREB transcription factor activity; modulation of chemical synaptic transmission; neuroinflammatory response; positive regulation of long-term synaptic potentiation; regulation of synaptic vesicle exocytosis
Sources:Amigo / QuickGO
Orthologs
Species	Human	Mouse
Entrez	107	432530
Ensembl	ENSG00000164742	ENSMUSG00000020431
UniProt	Q08828	O88444
RefSeq (mRNA)	NM_001281768; NM_021116	NM_009622
RefSeq (protein)	NP_001268697; NP_066939	NP_033752
Location (UCSC)	Chr 7: 45.57 – 45.72 Mb	Chr 11: 7.01 – 7.13 Mb
PubMed search
- Wikidata
View/Edit Human	View/Edit Mouse

Adenylyl cyclase type 1 is an enzyme that in humans is encoded by the ADCY1 gene.

This gene encodes a form of adenylyl cyclase expressed in the brain. A similar protein in mice is involved in pattern formation of the brain.

== Function ==
ADCY1 is a calmodulin-sensitive adenylyl cyclase. In terms of function, It may be involved in regulatory processes in the central nervous system; specifically, it may play a role in memory acquisition and learning. It is inhibited by the G protein beta and gamma subunit complex.
