= ADCY6 =

Protein-coding gene in humans

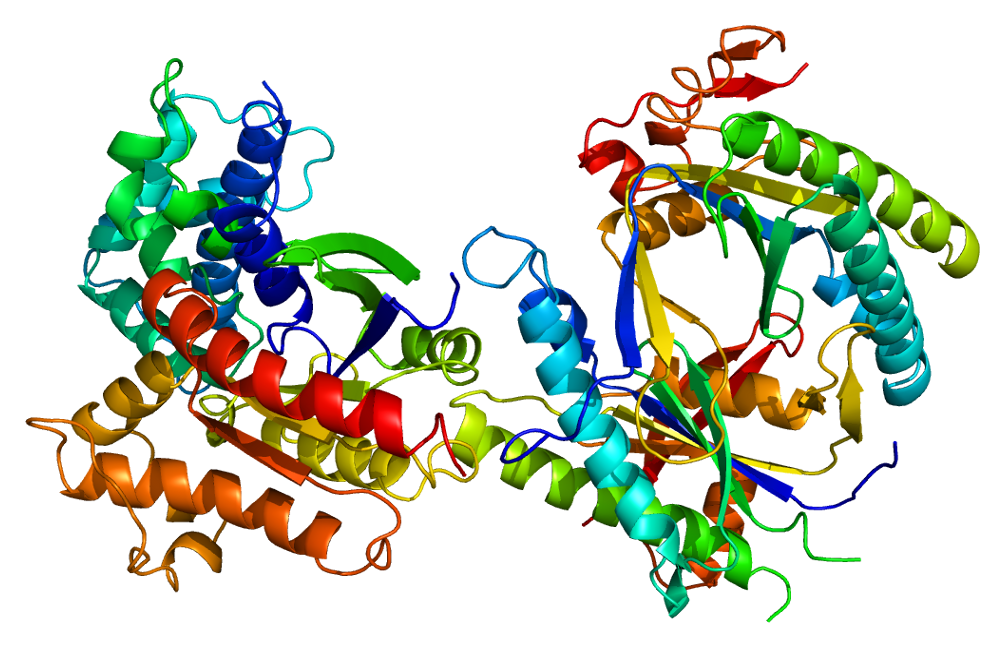

Identifiers
- Aliases: ADCY6, AC6, LCCS8, adenylate cyclase 6
- External IDs: OMIM: 600294; MGI: 87917; HomoloGene: 22400; GeneCards: ADCY6; OMA:ADCY6 - orthologs

Gene location (Human)
Chr.	Chromosome 12 (human)
Band	12q13.12	Start	48,766,194 bp
Band	12q13.12	End	48,789,089 bp

Gene location (Mouse)
Chr.	Chromosome 15 (mouse)
Band	15|15 F1	Start	98,487,854 bp
Band	15|15 F1	End	98,507,957 bp
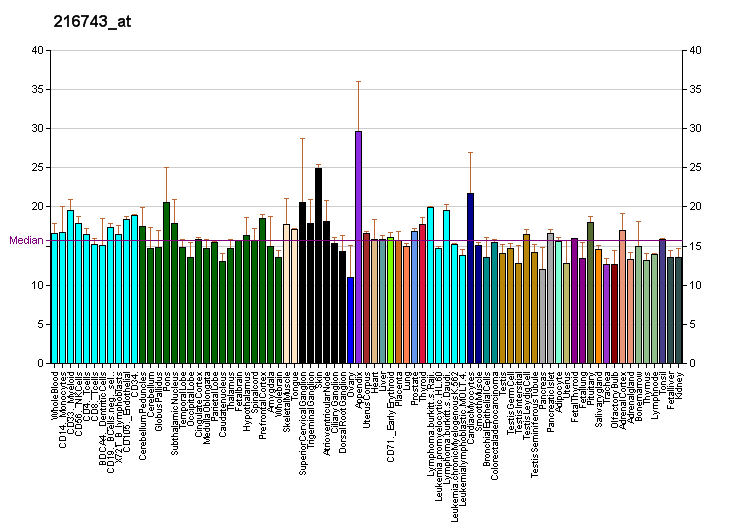

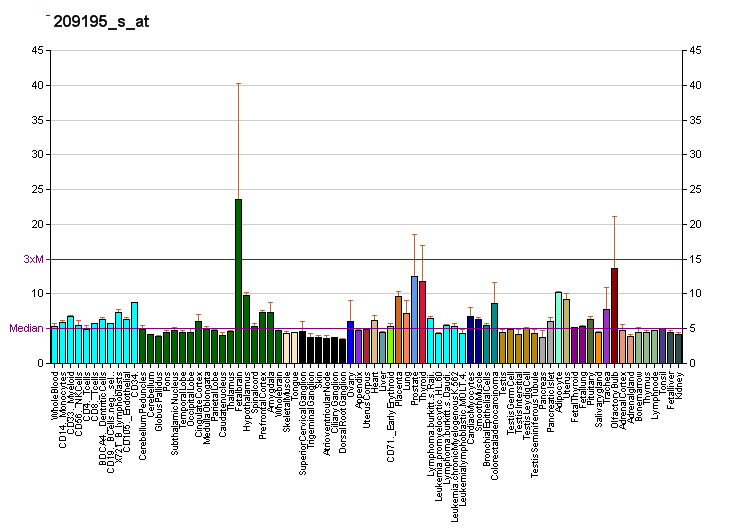
RNA expression pattern
Bgee	Human / Mouse (ortholog); Top expressed in: apex of heart; left ventricle; right auricle of heart; mucosa of transverse colon; right coronary artery; ascending aorta; stromal cell of endometrium; sural nerve; right ovary; body of stomach / Top expressed in: crypt of lieberkuhn of small intestine; right ventricle; neural layer of retina; myocardium of ventricle; cardiac muscle tissue of left ventricle; submandibular gland; atrium; medullary collecting duct; thymus; epithelium of stomach; More reference expression data
BioGPS	More reference expression data
Gene ontology
Molecular function	metal ion binding; nucleotide binding; lyase activity; protein kinase binding; adenylate cyclase activity; phosphorus-oxygen lyase activity; ATP binding; protein binding; guanylate cyclase activity; protein kinase C binding
Cellular component	integral component of membrane; cell projection; intrinsic component of plasma membrane; membrane; cilium; plasma membrane; guanylate cyclase complex, soluble; intracellular anatomical structure; integral component of plasma membrane; stereocilium
Biological process	negative regulation of neuron projection development; intracellular signal transduction; cAMP biosynthetic process; cellular response to forskolin; negative regulation of urine volume; cellular response to glucagon stimulus; cyclic nucleotide biosynthetic process; cellular response to vasopressin; cellular response to catecholamine stimulus; cellular response to prostaglandin E stimulus; dopamine receptor signaling pathway; adenylate cyclase-activating G protein-coupled receptor signaling pathway; renal water homeostasis; cGMP biosynthetic process; adenylate cyclase-inhibiting G protein-coupled receptor signaling pathway; blood vessel diameter maintenance; G protein-coupled receptor signaling pathway; activation of adenylate cyclase activity; activation of protein kinase A activity
Sources:Amigo / QuickGO
Orthologs
Species	Human	Mouse
Entrez	112	11512
Ensembl	ENSG00000174233	ENSMUSG00000022994
UniProt	O43306	Q01341
RefSeq (mRNA)	NM_015270; NM_020983; NM_001390830; NM_001390831	NM_007405; NM_001368413
RefSeq (protein)	NP_056085	NP_031431; NP_001355342
Location (UCSC)	Chr 12: 48.77 – 48.79 Mb	Chr 15: 98.49 – 98.51 Mb
PubMed search
- Wikidata
View/Edit Human	View/Edit Mouse

Adenylyl cyclase type 6 is an enzyme that in humans is encoded by the ADCY6 gene.

== Function ==
This gene encodes adenylyl cyclase 6, which is a membrane-associated enzyme and catalyzes the formation of the secondary messenger cyclic adenosine monophosphate (cAMP). The expression of this gene is found in normal thyroid and brain tissues, as well as some tumors; and its expression is significantly higher in one hyperfunctioning thyroid tumor than in normal thyroid tissue. Alternative splicing generates 2 transcript variants.
