= ADCY3 =

Protein-coding gene in humans

Identifiers
- Aliases: ADCY3, AC3, AC-III, adenylate cyclase 3, BMIQ19
- External IDs: OMIM: 600291; MGI: 99675; GeneCards: ADCY3
Enzyme activity
| EC # | BRENDA | ExPASy | KEGG | MetaCyc |
|---|---|---|---|---|
| 4.6.1.1 | ↗ | ↗ | ↗ | ↗ |

Gene location (Human)
| Chr. | Chromosome 2 (human) |
| Band | 2p23.3 | Start | 24,819,169 bp |
| Band | 2p23.3 | End | 24,920,237 bp |

Gene location (Mouse)
| Chr. | Chromosome 12 (mouse) |
| Band | 12|12 A1.1 | Start | 4,183,103 bp |
| Band | 12|12 A1.1 | End | 4,263,525 bp |
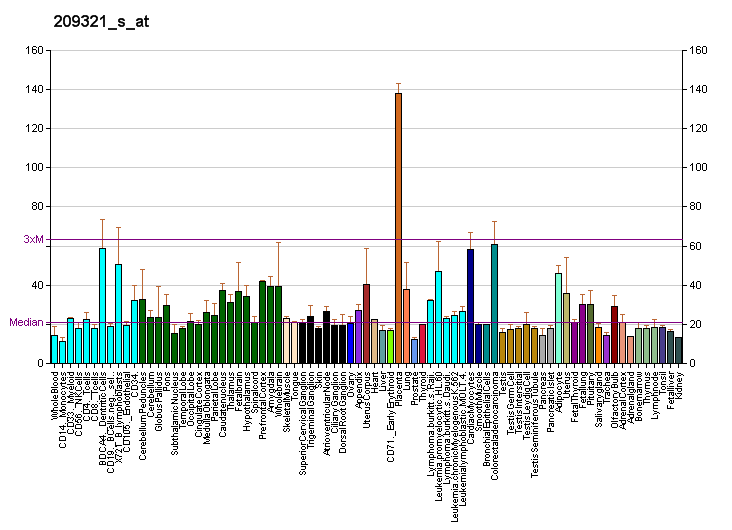

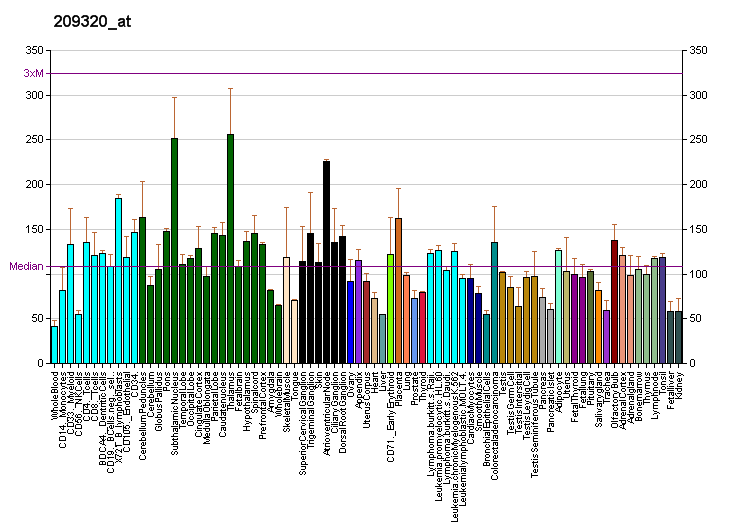
RNA expression pattern
| Bgee | Human / Mouse (ortholog); Top expressed in: tibial nerve; right ovary; sural nerve; left uterine tube; canal of the cervix; left ovary; stromal cell of endometrium; body of uterus; ectocervix; gastric mucosa / Top expressed in: gastrula; olfactory epithelium; brown adipose tissue; lumbar subsegment of spinal cord; subiculum; submandibular gland; ventromedial nucleus; paraventricular nucleus of hypothalamus; suprachiasmatic nucleus; superior frontal gyrus; More reference expression data |
| BioGPS | More reference expression data |
Gene ontology
| Molecular function | nucleotide binding; metal ion binding; calmodulin binding; lyase activity; phosphorus-oxygen lyase activity; ATP binding; adenylate cyclase activity; guanylate cyclase activity |
| Cellular component | cytoplasm; integral component of membrane; Golgi apparatus; cell projection; membrane; plasma membrane; integral component of plasma membrane; cilium; guanylate cyclase complex, soluble |
| Biological process | cAMP biosynthetic process; activation of protein kinase A activity; intracellular signal transduction; response to stimulus; cellular response to glucagon stimulus; cyclic nucleotide biosynthetic process; sensory perception of smell; renal water homeostasis; signal transduction; activation of adenylate cyclase activity; cGMP biosynthetic process; adenylate cyclase-inhibiting G protein-coupled receptor signaling pathway; adenylate cyclase-activating G protein-coupled receptor signaling pathway; single fertilization; acrosome reaction; olfactory learning; flagellated sperm motility; cellular response to forskolin; G protein-coupled receptor signaling pathway |
Sources:Amigo / QuickGO
Orthologs
| Databases | NCBI: entry; OMA: entry |
| Species | Human | Mouse |
| Entrez | 109 | 104111 |
| Ensembl | ENSG00000138031 | ENSMUSG00000020654 |
| UniProt | O60266 | Q8VHH7 |
| RefSeq (mRNA) | NM_004036; NM_001320613; NM_001377128; NM_001377129; NM_001377130 NM_001377131; NM_001377132 | NM_001159536; NM_001159537; NM_138305 |
| RefSeq (protein) | NP_001307542; NP_004027; NP_001364057; NP_001364058; NP_001364059 NP_001364060; NP_001364061 | NP_001153008; NP_001153009; NP_612178 |
| Location (UCSC) | Chr 2: 24.82 – 24.92 Mb | Chr 12: 4.18 – 4.26 Mb |
| PubMed search |
- Wikidata
| View/Edit Human | View/Edit Mouse |

Adenylyl cyclase type 3 is an enzyme that in humans is encoded by the ADCY3 gene.

== Function ==
This gene encodes adenylyl cyclase 3, which is a membrane-associated enzyme and catalyzes the formation of the secondary messenger cyclic adenosine monophosphate (cAMP).

The ADCY3 subtype likely mediates odorant detection (possibly) via modulation of intracellular cAMP concentration.
