= GUCY1A2 =

Protein-coding gene in the species Homo sapiens

Identifiers
- Aliases: GUCY1A2, GC-SA2, GUC1A2, guanylate cyclase 1, soluble, alpha 2, guanylate cyclase 1 soluble subunit alpha 2
- External IDs: OMIM: 601244; MGI: 2660877; HomoloGene: 47953; GeneCards: GUCY1A2; OMA:GUCY1A2 - orthologs

Gene location (Human)
Chr.	Chromosome 11 (human)
Band	11q22.3	Start	106,674,019 bp
Band	11q22.3	End	107,018,476 bp

Gene location (Mouse)
Chr.	Chromosome 9 (mouse)
Band	9|9 A1	Start	3,532,778 bp
Band	9|9 A1	End	3,894,736 bp
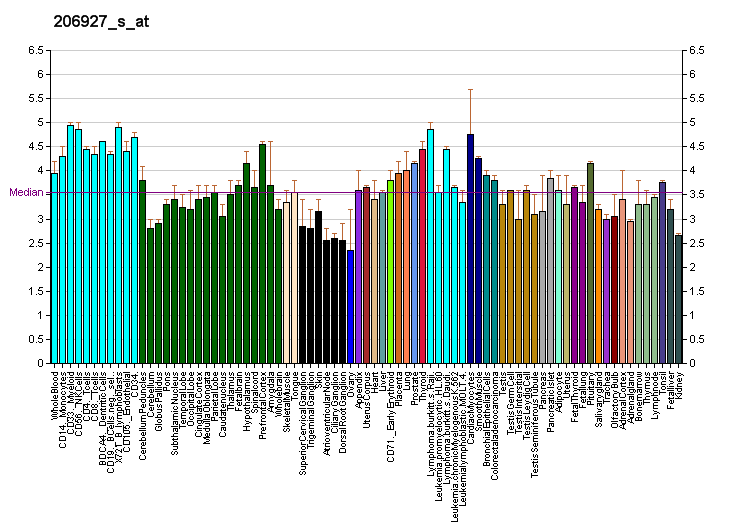
RNA expression pattern
Bgee	Human / Mouse (ortholog); Top expressed in: Brodmann area 23; lateral nuclear group of thalamus; visceral pleura; saphenous vein; postcentral gyrus; tail of epididymis; lower lobe of lung; external globus pallidus; vena cava; endothelial cell / Top expressed in: tail of embryo; genital tubercle; primary visual cortex; dentate gyrus of hippocampal formation granule cell; superior frontal gyrus; ventricular zone; embryo; cerebellar cortex; spermatid; yolk sac; More reference expression data
BioGPS	More reference expression data
Gene ontology
Molecular function	GTP binding; heme binding; nucleotide binding; phosphorus-oxygen lyase activity; lyase activity; protein binding; guanylate cyclase activity; adenylate cyclase activity
Cellular component	plasma membrane; guanylate cyclase complex, soluble; cytoplasm
Biological process	signal transduction; intracellular signal transduction; cyclic nucleotide biosynthetic process; cGMP biosynthetic process; positive regulation of nitric oxide mediated signal transduction
Sources:Amigo / QuickGO
Orthologs
Species	Human	Mouse
Entrez	2977	234889
Ensembl	ENSG00000152402	ENSMUSG00000041624
UniProt	P33402	n/a
RefSeq (mRNA)	NM_001256424; NM_000855	NM_001033322
RefSeq (protein)	NP_000846; NP_001243353	n/a
Location (UCSC)	Chr 11: 106.67 – 107.02 Mb	Chr 9: 3.53 – 3.89 Mb
PubMed search
- Wikidata
View/Edit Human	View/Edit Mouse

Guanylate cyclase soluble subunit alpha-2 is an enzyme that in humans is encoded by the GUCY1A2 gene.
