= Polar organelle =

Structure in cells

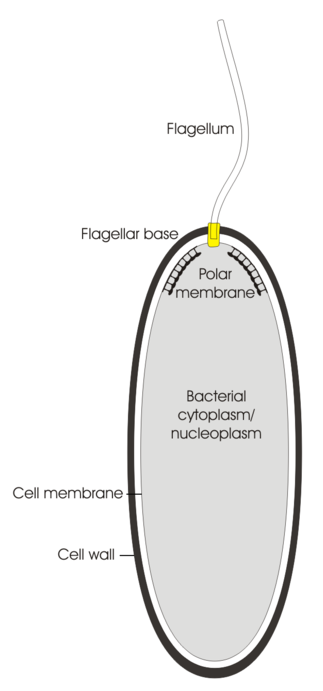
Sketch of a longitudinal ultrathin section through a typical motile bacterium bearing a flagellum and surrounding polar organelle at one end of the cell.

A polar organelle is a structure at a specialized region of the bacterial polar membrane that is associated with the flagellar apparatus. This flagellum-associated structure can easily be distinguished from the other membrane regions in ultra-thin sections of embedded bacteria by electron microscopy when the cell membrane is orientated perpendicular to the viewing direction. There, the membrane appears slightly thickened with a finely frilled layer facing the inside of the cell. It is also possible to isolate these polar organelles from the bacterial cells and study them in face view in negatively stained preparations.

The polar organelle bears a fine array of attached particles in hexagonal close packing and these have been shown to possess ATPase activity. The polar organelle is found in close juxtaposition to the points of insertion of the bacterial flagella into the plasma membrane, especially where multiple flagella bases are grouped in a region of the cell membrane. It may thus be inferred that the polar organelle could be of importance in the supply and transfer of energy to the bidirectional molecular rotational motor situated at the base of each individual bacterial flagellum (see also electrochemical gradient).

Polarity can be innate within bacteria, even without the presence of a defined polar organelle. Even bacteria that exhibit symmetrical morphology can have polar characteristics due to charged regions within their plasma membrane. Polar regions of bacteria are often systemic and composed of inclusion bodies that can accumulate at charged poles within the bacteria. The fundamental polarization of bacteria has potential to be developed and manipulated to position different polar organelles and protein complexes. An example of this can be found in Escherichia coli, where fluorescence microscopy has been used to observe the polar clustering of chemoreceptors. This self-assembly process illuminated fluorescence-tagged chemoreceptors accumulating significantly at the distinct poles of the E. coli bacteria. This natural assembly does not utilize an anchor or other method to regulate clustering at the poles. The development of localized polar regions in bacteria can arise naturally without the function or the polar organelle.

== Motility organelle polarity ==
In many bacteria, motility serves as an essential life function for survival, nutrient acquisition, chemotaxis, and more. In many cases, the formation of a polar organelles such as a flagellum and pilli represents the cumulation of charges within an organism's plasma membrane. The precise positioning of these organelles has been influenced by bacteria's rapid turnover rate and genetic variation. This refinement of polar motility organelles allows bacterial movement to be extremely energy efficient. The rapidly-developing field of bacterial localization studies have defined an increasing list of polar protein complexes, which suggests that many prokaryotic functions are confined to the poles. Understanding how these functions are regulated in space and with bacterial motility is important in medical bacteriology, as many virulence factors are linked to cell polarity.

=== Flagellum motility ===
==== FlhFG ====
FlhFG acts as a GTPase, which plays a crucial role in the development of flagellum in many bacterial species. Typical flagellum development originates within the bacterium with regulatory proteins and flagellin accumulating at a pole in the plasma membrane. Next, the basal body of the flagellum is produced which contains the MS-ring. This basal body facilitates the formation of the extracellular hook and flagellar filament. An example of the importance of FlhFG is present in Vibrio cholerae, as mutated FlhF reduces the development of viable flagellum. In V. cholerae, FlhF is essential in recruiting the MS-ring protein FliF, and in mutants this process is disrupted. In the absence of FlhF, the flagella are formed at a significantly reduced frequency and in nonpolar locations. When functional FlhF-GFP is present, the FhF-GFP is localized to the pole in V. Cholerae independently of the flagellar structural proteins.

However, FlhF does not have the same effect in each species of bacteria. In Bacillus cereus, a peritrichous flagellated bacteria, FlhF reduction decreased flagellation but resulted in a bias toward polar flagella from the normal peritrichous arrangement. This identifies that certain bacteria direct FlhF to a specific pole, so FlhF then recruits flagellar components to a polar site. This allows bacteria to position flagella strategically throughout the bacterial polar membrane. When multiple flagella are present, correct polar localization is especially important when bacteria need to change direction or respond specifically to chemical signals in the external environment.

==== TipNF-PflI ====
Different to FlhF, which plays a critical role in MS-ring recruitment, the PfIl protein does not recruit physical equipment of influence flagellum formation. PflI is a positioning protein which is a biotic membrane protein made up of a coiled domain followed by a 102 proline residue stretch. This protein has been identified in Caulobacter crescentus, and this bacteria the Pfli protein was localized to the region of the plasma membrane where the flagella would be created. This localization occurred before the flagellar proteins were expressed, and Pfli was still localized to a pole even when no flagella structure was expressed. Furthermore, when the FliF protein associated with MS-ring formation was absent, the PflI still localized in the membrane.

Additional evidence for the flagella positioning behavior of the PflI protein is evident when inhibiting or promoting the PflI protein. When the production of PflI is varied, a statistically higher proportion of cells contain misplaced flagella within the bacterial plasma membrane. The mechanism in which PflI influences flagella localization and development is unknown. Early research indicates that PflI may be influenced to localize around the future flagellar pole because of TipF, an EAL-domain protein. The EAL domain works with accessory domains to help regulate the bacteria's modular function. Altering the location of this polar organelle by influencing PflI function can negatively influence a bacteria's chances for survival and reproduction.

=== Gliding motility ===
==== MglAB ====
The MglA GTPase plays a pivotal role in regulating gliding motility in Myxcoccus xanthus. Gliding motility primarily takes place on surfaces, and often bacteria contain an extracellular adhesive complex which allows bacteria to smoothly "glide" in contrast to a motor-like flagella. MglA affects the motility of cells by regulating the effectors which control the movement and reversals of movement in bacteria. In M. xanthus, these effectors move from charged pole to pole in the plasma membrane, and this intra-membrane movement relies on the MglA GTPase. These poles often are isolated to be regions with the largest negative membrane curvature. In fact, the MglA localizes to a charged pole in the membrane in a very similar mechanism as FihF.

Another protein, MglB, encoded near MglA, acts in conjunction with MglA and also oscillates to allow gliding motility. MglB and MglA both continuously regulate one another in the localization and movement dynamics for M. xanthus. Fluorescence microscopy can visualize the coordinated countercyclical localizations of MglA and MglB working in combination with one another within M. xanthus. When either MglB or MglA is inhibited, the conjunctional localization is disrupted. This occurs by blocking the rotating effectors as well as changing the frequency of movement reversals characterized within wild-type M. xanthus. The oscillation of polar localization signals in the plasma membrane mimics a polar organelle that would provide motility in a flagellar bacterium.

=== Pili motility ===
==== Polar Pili ====
Pili are another important form of motility found within prokaryotic bacteria. Pili often surround cell and can have different functional roles to help cells respond to their external environment. An example is Type IV pili which, if present in bacteria, are essential for DNA uptake, motility, biofilm formation, and more. The bacterium P. aeruginosa contains Pili which biochemically act similar in function, structure, and localization to the pili of M. xanthus that provide it gliding motility. P. aeruginosa specifically utilizes twitching motility, where a pilus extends and contracts to move the cell. Coordination with other pili allows, and minuscule movements of polarity throughout the plasma membrane allow effective movement for the cell. In this way, the polar organelle region of the polar pili and twitching motility cells is much more dynamic compared to that of a cell which utilizes a flagellum.

Cells which exhibit Pili motility are heavily dependent on the MreB cytoskeleton which maintains polar localization in the bacterial polar membrane. This MreB cytoskeleton works as an actin-like filament. In parallel, MreB plays a specific role in the localization of the specific S effector in the gliding movement dynamics of M. xanthus. When MreB function was inhibited, the bacteria mislocalized their membrane to nonpolar sites and the cells had pili develop at lateral sites rather than the pole. The exact mechanism of how MreB causes membrane localization is unknown. The MreB cytoskeleton has many other functions within a polar pili cell affecting virulence, plasmid distribution cell wall enzymatic behavior, and more.
