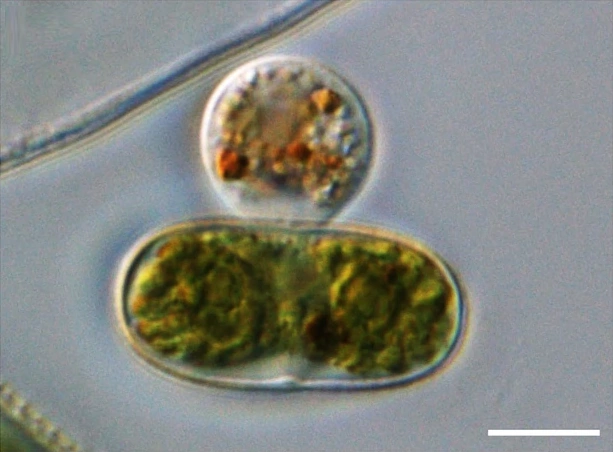
- The glissomonad Orciraptor agilis attacking an Actinotaenium cell.

Scientific classification
- Domain: Eukaryota
- Supergroup: Rhizaria
- Phylum: Cercozoa
- Subphylum: Filosa
- Infraphylum: Monadofilosa
- Order: Glissomonadida; Howe & Cavalier-Smith in Howe et al. 2009

Families and genera
- "Sandonidae"; Dujardinidae (=Clade W); "Bodomorphidae"; Proleptomonadidae; "Allapsidae"; "Viridiraptoridae" (=Clade X); Saccharomycomorphidae (=Clade T); Neuromorpha; And see text

Synonyms
- "Heteromitidae" Kent 1880, emend. Mylnikov 1990, emend. Mylnikov & Karpov 2004; Bodomorphidae Hollande 1952

= Glissomonadida =

Order of protists

The glissomonads are a group of bacterivorous gliding flagellated protists that compose the order Glissomonadida, in the amoeboflagellate phylum Cercozoa. They comprise a vast, largely undescribed diversity of soil and freshwater organisms.

== Morphology ==
=== External appearance ===
Glissomonads are zooflagellates that aren't strongly amoeboid, and are only covered by a plasma membrane. Their common ancestor is thought to be a biflagellate, with a short anterior flagellum and a long posterior flagellum, that glided on the substrate by moving their posterior flagellum. In gliding descendants, the cell's posterior zone is usually rounded, giving the cell an ovoid shape. Some species may temporarily extend a protoplasmic tail, that unlike most cercomonads doesn't trail along the posterior flagellum.

The group also includes descendants that have lost their gliding, mainly Proleptomonas. This genus has another exception to the group: an anterior flagellum that is longer than the posterior, while the posterior is adherent to the cell and not used for gliding.

=== Internal structure ===
Most species lack obvious morphological specializations: there is no cytopharynx, deep flagellar groove, or pocket evident. Apart from Proleptomonas, which is exceptionally elongated and has a modified cytoskeleton, the nucleus is usually anterior and attached to the kinetid (= flagellar apparatus) through well-developed fibrous roots. There are typically two posterior and one anterior microtubular centriolar roots. A contractile vacuole is usually seen in the cell's posterior area. The mitochondria have tubular cristae. There is a microbody attached to the posterior side of the nucleus, except in Proleptomonas. The Golgi apparatus is usually seen associated with the nucleus, which doesn't happen in all cercozoans.

Both flagella have the same thickness and are simple, without a paraxonemal rod, hairs or scales, sometimes acronematic (= with an acroneme). Unlike in cercomonads, the ciliary transition zone has a dense transverse plate at the distal end. The anterior flagellum beats like a cilium towards the left, as seen in cercomonads, and is sometimes reduced to a short stub without an axoneme.

== Ecology and behavior ==
Glissomonads are heterotrophic aerobic organisms that almost exclusively inhabit soil or freshwater, where they feed on bacteria. Sexual reproduction is unknown. Cysts are present in the group, and have smooth walls.

== Phylogeny ==
A phylogeny recovered in 2021; Sandona, Neoheteromita, Allapsidae and Saccharomycomorpha were paraphyletic because of uncultured lineages:

- Glissomonadida
  - - - - - - Sandonidae
            - Dujardinidae
          - Bodomorphidae
        - - - - Saccharomycomorphidae
              - Proleptomonadidae
            - - Clade U
              - Clade Z
      - - - Allantion
          - Allapsa
        - - Teretomonas
          - Group Te
  - - Viridiraptoridae
    - Clade Y

A phylogeny recovered in 2025; Group Te, Neoheteromita, Allapsidae, Allantion, Dujardina, Viridiraptoridae, Clade U, Pansomonadida, Agitatidae and Clade Z were paraphyletic because of uncultured lineages and Glissomonadida was paraphyletic:

- Glissomonadida (2018)
  - - - Allantion
      - Allapsa
    - - Teretomonas
      - Group Te (1)
  - - - - Sandonidae
        - - Dujardinidae
          - Bodomorphidae
      - - Viridiraptoridae + Allapsidae_X_sp_28
        - Clade Y
    - - - - - Group Te (2) + Clade U + Neuromorpha
            - Pansomonadida + other
          - Saccharomycomorphidae
        - Proleptomonadidae
      - Allapsidae_X_sp_14 + Clade Z

Another analysis in 2025; Sandonidae, Sandona, Bodomorphidae and Bodomorpha were paraphyletic because of uncultured lineages and Glissomonadida was paraphyletic:

- Glissomonadida (2018)
  - - - - - Sandonidae + HM536172.1 Bodomorpha sp.
          - - Dujardinidae
            - Bodomorpha minima
        - Proleptomonadidae
          Proleptomonas
      - Viridiraptoridae
    - Pansomonadida
  - Allapsidae

== Classification ==
The current classification is:

- Order Glissomonadida (paraphyletic) Howe & Cavalier-Smith in Howe et al. 2009
  - Family Sandonidae (paraphyletic) Howe et al. 2009
    - Flectomonas Howe et al. 2009
    - Mollimonas Howe & Cavalier-Smith in Howe et al. 2011
    - Neoheteromita (paraphyletic) Howe et al. 2009
    - Sandona (paraphyletic) Howe et al. 2009
  - Family Dujardinidae (=Clade W) Howe & Cavalier-Smith in Howe et al. 2011
    - Dujardina (paraphyletic) Howe & Cavalier-Smith in Howe et al. 2011
  - Family Bodomorphidae (paraphyletic) Hollande 1952, emend. Cavalier-Smith in Howe et al. 2009
    - Bodomorpha (paraphyletic) Hollande 1942
  - Family Proleptomonadidae Howe et al. 2009
    - Proleptomonas Woodcock 1916
  - Family Allapsidae (paraphyletic) Howe et al. 2009
    - Allapsa (paraphyletic) Howe et al. 2009
    - Allantion (paraphyletic) Sandon 1924
    - Teretomonas Howe et al. 2009
  - Family Viridiraptoridae (=Clade X) (paraphyletic) Hess & Melkonian 2013
    - Orciraptor Hess & Melkonian 2013
    - Viridiraptor Hess & Melkonian 2013
  - Family Saccharomycomorphidae (=Clade T) Feng et al. 2021
    - Saccharomycomorpha (paraphyletic) Feng et al. 2021
  - Neuromorpha Corso, Triplett & Gage 2025
  - Clade U (paraphyletic)
  - Clade Y
  - Clade Z (paraphyletic)
  - Group Te (paraphyletic)
