= Bacterial motility =

Ability of bacteria to move independently using metabolic energy

Various types of motility systems roughly assigned to the relative positions in the Tree of Life.: 1. (1a) bacterial flagellar swimming, (1b) spirochetes flagellar swimming, (1c) magnetotactic bacterial flagellar swimming, (1d) bacterial flagellar swarming, (1e) Leptospira crawling motility; 2. bacterial pili motility; 3. Myxococcus xanthus adventurous (A) motility; 4. Bacteroidetes gliding; 5. Chloroflexus aggregans surface motility; 6. Synechococcus nonflagellar swimming; 7. archaella swimming; 8. (8a) amoeba motility based on actin polymerization, (8b) actin-based comet tail bacterial motility; 9. heliozoa motility based on microtubule depolymerization; 10. myosin sliding, (10a) amoeba motility driven by contraction of cortical actin–myosin, (10b) animal muscle contraction; 11. kinesin sliding; 12. dynein sliding, (11a, 12a) flagellar surface motility (FSM), (12b) flagellar swimming; 13. haptonemal contraction; 14. spasmoneme contraction; 15. amoeboid motility of nematode sperm; 16. Mycoplasma mobile gliding; 17. Mycoplasma pneumoniae gliding; 18. Spiroplasma swimming; 19. (i) bacterial sliding; 20. (ii) gas vesicle; 21. (iii) dandelion seed

Bacterial motility is the ability of bacteria to move independently using metabolic energy. Most motility mechanisms that evolved among bacteria also evolved in parallel among the archaea. Most rod-shaped bacteria can move using their own power, which allows colonization of new environments and discovery of new resources for survival. Bacterial movement depends not only on the characteristics of the medium, but also on the use of different appendages to propel. Swarming and swimming movements are both powered by rotating flagella. Whereas swarming is a multicellular 2D movement over a surface and requires the presence of surfactants, swimming is movement of individual cells in liquid environments.

Other types of movement occurring on solid surfaces include twitching, gliding and sliding, which are all independent of flagella. Twitching depends on the extension, attachment to a surface, and retraction of type IV pili which pull the cell forwards in a manner similar to the action of a grappling hook, providing energy to move the cell forward. Bacterial gliding uses different motor complexes, such as the focal adhesion complexes of Myxococcus. Unlike twitching and gliding motilities, which are active movements where the motive force is generated by the individual cell, sliding is a passive movement. It relies on the motive force generated by the cell community due to the expansive forces caused by cell growth within the colony in the presence of surfactants, which reduce the friction between the cells and the surface. The overall movement of a bacterium can be the result of alternating tumble and swim phases. As a result, the trajectory of a bacterium swimming in a uniform environment will form a random walk with relatively straight swims interrupted by random tumbles that reorient the bacterium.

Bacteria can also exhibit taxis, which is the ability to move towards or away from stimuli in their environment. In chemotaxis the overall motion of bacteria responds to the presence of chemical gradients. In phototaxis bacteria can move towards or away from light. This can be particularly useful for cyanobacteria, which use light for photosynthesis. Likewise, magnetotactic bacteria align their movement with the Earth's magnetic field. Some bacteria have escape reactions allowing them to back away from stimuli that might harm or kill. This is fundamentally different from navigation or exploration, since response times must be rapid. Escape reactions are achieved by action potential-like phenomena, and have been observed in biofilms as well as in single cells such as cable bacteria.

Currently there is interest in developing biohybrid microswimmers, microscopic swimmers which are part biological and part engineered by humans, such as swimming bacteria modified to carry cargo.

== Background ==
In 1828, the British biologist Robert Brown discovered the incessant jiggling motion of pollen in water and described his finding in his article "A Brief Account of Microscopical Observations…", leading to extended scientific discussion about the origin of this motion. This enigma was resolved only in 1905, when Albert Einstein published his celebrated essay Über die von der molekularkinetischen Theorie der Wärme geforderte Bewegung von in ruhenden Flüssigkeiten suspendierten Teilchen. Einstein not only deduced the diffusion of suspended particles in quiescent liquids, but also suggested these findings could be used to determine particle size — in a sense, he was the world's first microrheologist.

Ever since Newton established his equations of motion, the mystery of motion on the microscale has emerged frequently in scientific history, as famously demonstrated by a couple of articles that should be discussed briefly. First, an essential concept, popularized by Osborne Reynolds, is that the relative importance of inertia and viscosity for the motion of a fluid depends on certain details of the system under consideration. The Reynolds number Re, named in his honor, quantifies this comparison as a dimensionless ratio of characteristic inertial and viscous forces:

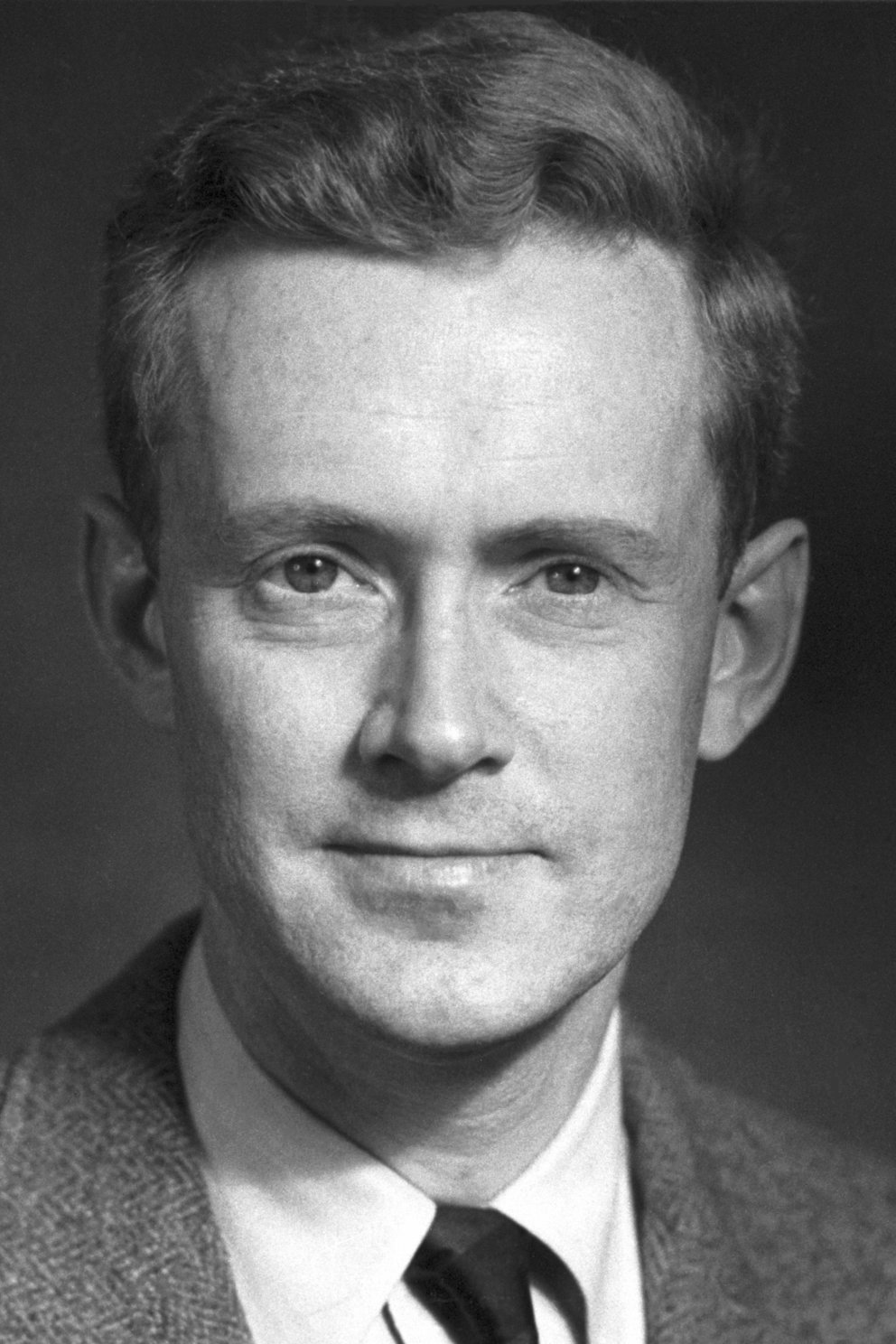
E. M. Purcell

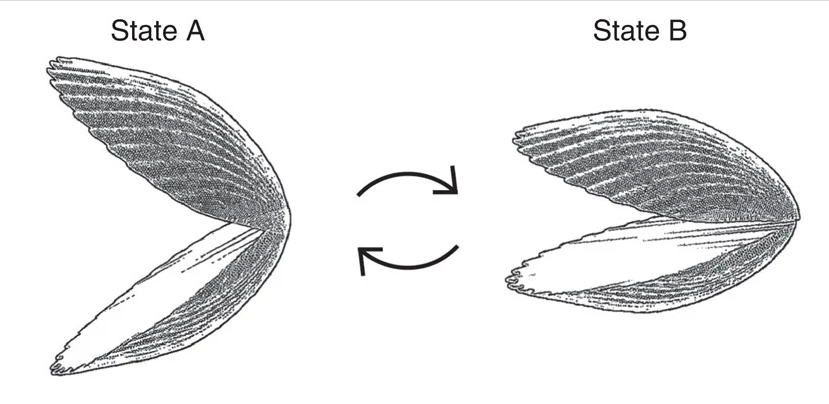
Purcell's swimming scallop "Fast or slow, it exactly retraces its trajectory and it's back where it started".

$$\mathrm{Re} = \frac{\rho u l}{\mu}$$

Here, ρ represents the density of the fluid; u is a characteristic velocity of the system (for instance, the velocity of a swimming particle); l is a characteristic length scale (e.g., the swimmer size); and μ is the viscosity of the fluid. Taking the suspending fluid to be water, and using experimentally observed values for u, one can determine that inertia is important for macroscopic swimmers like fish (Re = 100), while viscosity dominates the motion of microscale swimmers like bacteria (Re = 10^{−4}).

The overwhelming importance of viscosity for swimming at the micrometer scale has profound implications for swimming strategy. This has been discussed memorably by E. M. Purcell, who invited the reader into the world of microorganisms and theoretically studied the conditions of their motion. In the first place, propulsion strategies of large scale swimmers often involve imparting momentum to the surrounding fluid in periodic discrete events, such as vortex shedding, and coasting between these events through inertia. This cannot be effective for microscale swimmers like bacteria: due to the large viscous damping, the inertial coasting time of a micron-sized object is on the order of 1 μs. The coasting distance of a microorganism moving at a typical speed is about 0.1 angstroms (Å). Purcell concluded that only forces that are exerted in the present moment on a microscale body contribute to its propulsion, so a constant energy conversion method is essential.

Microorganisms have optimized their metabolism for continuous energy production, while purely artificial microswimmers (microrobots) must obtain energy from the environment, since their on-board-storage-capacity is very limited. As a further consequence of the continuous dissipation of energy, biological and artificial microswimmers do not obey the laws of equilibrium statistical physics, and need to be described by non-equilibrium dynamics. Mathematically, Purcell explored the implications of low Reynolds number by taking the Navier-Stokes equation and eliminating the inertial terms:

$$\begin{align} \mu \nabla^2 \mathbf{u} -\boldsymbol{\nabla}p &= \boldsymbol{0} \\ \end{align}$$

where $\mathbf{u}$ is the velocity of the fluid and $\boldsymbol{\nabla} p$ is the gradient of the pressure. As Purcell noted, the resulting equation — the Stokes equation — contains no explicit time dependence. This has some important consequences for how a suspended body (e.g., a bacterium) can swim through periodic mechanical motions or deformations (e.g., of a flagellum). First, the rate of motion is practically irrelevant for the motion of the microswimmer and of the surrounding fluid: changing the rate of motion will change the scale of the velocities of the fluid and of the microswimmer, but it will not change the pattern of fluid flow. Secondly, reversing the direction of mechanical motion will simply reverse all velocities in the system. These properties of the Stokes equation severely restrict the range of feasible swimming strategies.

As a concrete illustration, consider a mathematical scallop that consists of two rigid pieces connected by a hinge. Can the "scallop" swim by periodically opening and closing the hinge? No: regardless of how the cycle of opening and closing depends on time, the scallop will always return to its starting point at the end of the cycle. Here originated the striking quote: "Fast or slow, it exactly retraces its trajectory and it's back where it started". In light of this scallop theorem, Purcell developed approaches concerning how artificial motion at the micro scale can be generated. This paper continues to inspire ongoing scientific discussion; for example, recent work by the Fischer group from the Max Planck Institute for Intelligent Systems experimentally confirmed that the scallop principle is only valid for Newtonian fluids.

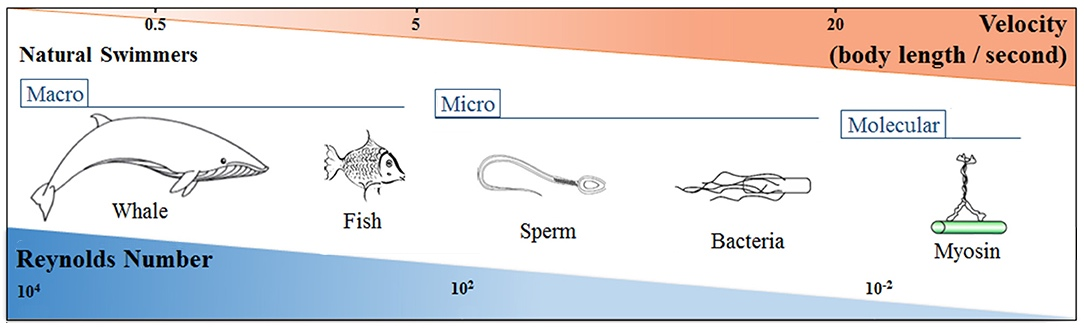
Changes in speed and Reynolds number with length of swimmer

Motile systems have developed in the natural world over time and length scales spanning several orders of magnitude, and have evolved anatomically and physiologically to attain optimal strategies for self-propulsion and overcome the implications of high viscosity forces and Brownian motion, as shown in the diagram on the right.

Some of the smallest known motile systems are motor proteins, i.e., proteins and protein complexes present in cells that carry out a variety of physiological functions by transducing chemical energy into mechanical energy. These motor proteins are classified as myosins, kinesins, or dyneins. Myosin motors are responsible for muscle contractions and the transport of cargousing actin filaments as tracks. Dynein motors and kinesin motors, on the other hand, use microtubules to transport vesicles across the cell. The mechanism these protein motors use to convert chemical energy into movement depends on ATP hydrolysis, which leads to a conformation modification in the globular motor domain, leading to directed motion.

Bacteria can be roughly divided into two fundamentally different groups, gram-positive and gram-negative bacteria, distinguished by the architecture of their cell envelope. In each case the cell envelope is a complex multi-layered structure that protects the cell from its environment. In gram-positive bacteria, the cytoplasmic membrane is only surrounded by a thick cell wall of peptidoglycan. By contrast, the envelope of gram-negative bacteria is more complex and consists (from inside to outside) of the cytoplasmic membrane, a thin layer of peptidoglycan, and an additional outer membrane, also called the lipopolysaccharide layer. Other bacterial cell surface structures range from disorganised slime layers to highly structured capsules. These are made from secreted slimy or sticky polysaccharides or proteins that provide protection for the cells and are in direct contact with the environment. They have other functions, including attachment to solid surfaces. Additionally, protein appendages can be present on the surface: fimbriae and pili can have different lengths and diameters and their functions include adhesion and twitching motility.

Specifically, for microorganisms that live in aqueous environments, locomotion refers to swimming, and hence the world is full of different classes of swimming microorganisms, such as bacteria, protozoa, and algae. Bacteria move due to rotation of hair-like filaments called flagella, which are anchored to a protein motor complex on the bacteria cell wall.

== Movement mechanisms ==
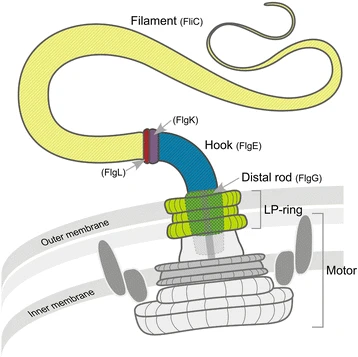
Flagellum from a gram-negative bacterium rotated by a molecular motor at its base

Bacteria have two different primary mechanisms they use for movement. The flagellum is used for swimming and swarming, and the pilus (or fimbria) is used for twitching.

=== Flagellum ===
The flagellum (plural, flagella; a group of flagella is called a tuft) is a helical, thin and long appendage attached to the cell surface by one of its ends, performing a rotational motion to push or pull the cell. During the rotation of the bacterial flagellar motor, which is located in the membrane, the flagella rotate at speeds between 200 and 2000 rpm, depending on the bacterial species. The hook substructure of the bacterial flagellum acts as a universal joint connecting the motor to the flagellar filament.

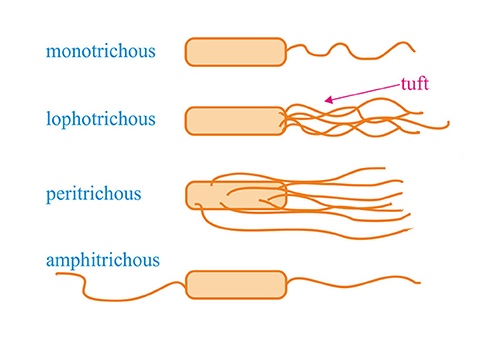
Bacterial flagellate configurations

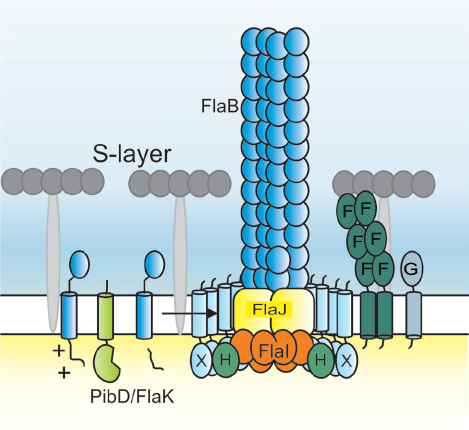
Model of an archaellum

Prokaryotic flagella run in a rotary movement, while eukaryotic flagella run in a bending movement

Prokaryotes, both bacteria and archaea, primarily use flagella for locomotion.

- Bacterial flagella are helical filaments, each with a rotary motor at its base which can turn clockwise or counterclockwise. They provide two of several kinds of bacterial motility.
- Archaeal flagella are called archaella, and function in much the same way as bacterial flagella. Structurally the archaellum is superficially similar to a bacterial flagellum, but it differs in many details and is considered non-homologous.

Some eukaryotic cells also use flagella — and they can be found in some protists and plants as well as animal cells. Eukaryotic flagella are complex cellular projections that lash back and forth, rather than in a circular motion. Prokaryotic flagella use a rotary motor, and the eukaryotic flagella use a complex sliding filament system. Eukaryotic flagella are ATP-driven, while prokaryotic flagella can be ATP-driven (archaea) or proton-driven (bacteria).

Different types of cell flagellation are found depending on the number and arrangement of the flagella on the cell surface, e.g., only at the cell poles or spread over the cell surface. In polar flagellation, the flagella are present at one or both ends of the cell: if a single flagellum is attached at one pole, the cell is called monotrichous; if a tuft of flagella is located at one pole, the cells is lophotrichous; when flagella are present at both ends, the cell is amphitrichous. In peritrichous flagellation, the flagella are distributed in different locations around the cell surface. Nevertheless, variations within this classification can be found, like lateral and subpolar—instead of polar—monotrichous and lophotrichous flagellation.

The rotary motor model used by bacteria uses the protons of an electrochemical gradient in order to move their flagella. Torque in the flagella of bacteria is created by particles that conduct protons around the base of the flagellum. The direction of rotation of the flagella in bacteria comes from the occupancy of the proton channels along the perimeter of the flagellar motor.

The bacterial flagellum is a protein-nanomachine that converts electrochemical energy in the form of a gradient of H+ or Na+ ions into mechanical work. The flagellum is composed of three parts: the basal body, the hook, and the filament. The basal body is a reversible motor that spans the bacterial cell envelope. It is composed of the central rod and several rings: in Gram-negative bacteria, these are the outer L-ring (lipopolysaccharide) and P-ring (peptidoglycan), and the inner MS-ring (membrane/supramembrane) and C-ring (cytoplasmic). In Gram-positive bacteria only the inner rings are present. The Mot proteins (MotA and MotB) surround the inner rings in the cytoplasmic membrane; ion translocation through the Mot proteins provide the energy for flagella rotation. The Fli proteins allow reversal of the direction of rotation of the flagella in response to specific stimuli. The hook connects the filament to the motor protein in the base. The helical filament is composed of many copies of the protein flagellin, and it can rotate clockwise (CW) and counterclockwise (CCW).

=== Pilus (fimbria) ===
Model of a type IV pilus machine

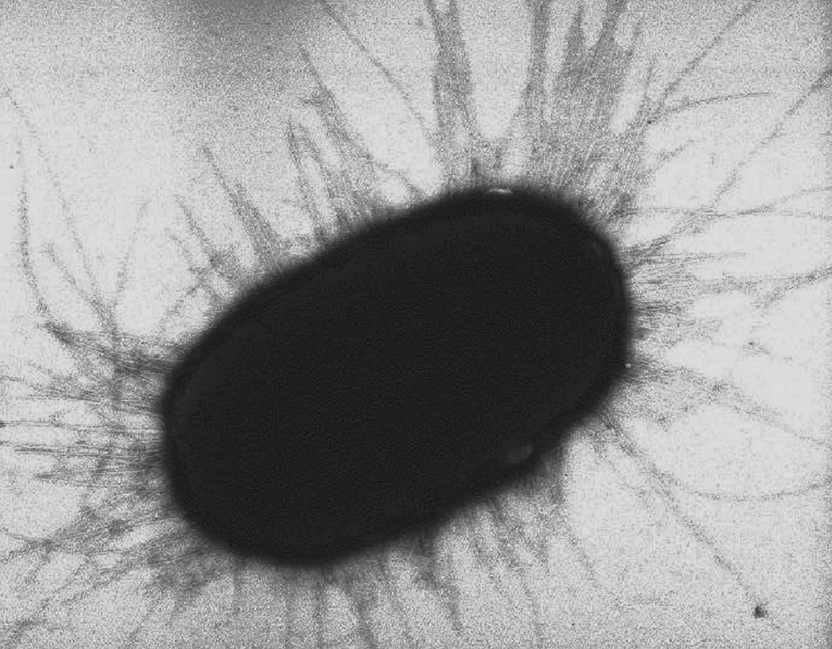
Pili can be used for twitching.
They are long, sticky filaments, as shown here covering this E. coli bacterium

A pilus (Latin for 'hair') is a hair-like appendage found on the surface of many bacteria and archaea. The terms pilus and fimbria (Latin for 'fringe') can be used interchangeably, although some researchers reserve the term pilus for the appendage required for bacterial conjugation. Dozens of these structures can exist on the bacterial and archaeal surface.

Twitching motility is a form of crawling bacterial motility used to move over surfaces. Twitching is mediated by the activity of a particular type of pilus called type IV pilus which extends from the cell's exterior, binds to surrounding solid substrates and retracts, pulling the cell forwards in a manner similar to the action of a grappling hook. Pili are not used just for twitching. They are also antigenic and are required for the formation of biofilm, as they attach bacteria to host surfaces for colonisation during infection. They are fragile and constantly replaced, sometimes with pili of different composition.

=== Other ===
Gliding motility is a type of translocation that is independent of propulsive structures such as flagella or pili. Gliding allows microorganisms to travel along the surface of low aqueous films. The mechanisms of this motility are only partially known. Gliding motility uses a highly diverse set of different motor complexes, including e.g., the focal adhesion complexes of Myxococcus. The speed of gliding varies between organisms, and the reversal of direction is seemingly regulated by some sort of internal clock.

== Modes of locomotion ==
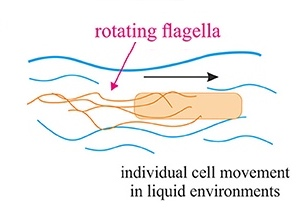
Bacterial swimming

Most rod-shaped bacteria can move using their own power, which allows colonization of new environments and discovery of new resources for survival. Bacterial movement depends not only on the characteristics of the medium, but also on the use of different appendages to propel. Swarming and swimming movements are both powered by rotating flagella. Whereas swarming is a multicellular 2D movement over a surface and requires the presence of surfactant substances, swimming is movement of individual cells in liquid environments.

Other types of movement occurring on solid surfaces include twitching, gliding and sliding, which are all independent of flagella. Twitching motility depends on the extension, attachment to a surface, and retraction of type IV pili which provide the energy required to push the cell forward. Gliding motility uses a highly diverse set of different motor complexes, including e.g., the focal adhesion complexes of Myxococcus. Unlike twitching and gliding motilities, which are active movements where the motive force is generated by the individual cell, sliding is a passive movement. It relies on the motive force generated by the cell community due to the expansive forces caused by cell growth within the colony in the presence of surfactants, which reduce the friction between the cells and the surface.

=== Swimming ===
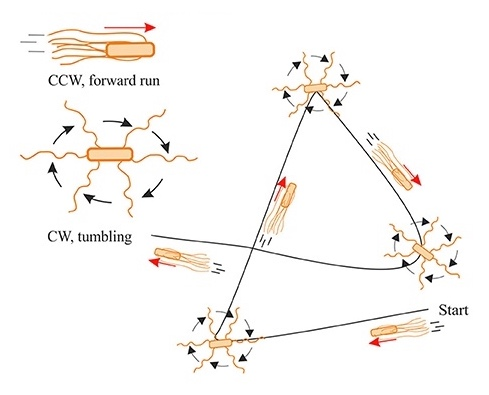
Run-and-tumble Example: Escherichia coli

External videos
- Why do bacteria move like vibrating chaos snakes? – Journey to the Microcosmos

Many bacteria swim, propelled by rotation of the flagella outside the cell body. In contrast to protist flagella, bacterial flagella are rotors and — irrespective of species and type of flagellation — they have only two modes of operation: clockwise (CW) or counterclockwise (CCW) rotation. Bacterial swimming is used in bacterial taxis (mediated by specific receptors and signal transduction pathways) for the bacterium to move in a directed manner along gradients and reach more favorable conditions for life. The direction of flagellar rotation is controlled by the type of molecules detected by the receptors on the surface of the cell: in the presence of an attractant gradient, the rate of smooth swimming increases, while the presence of a repellent gradient increases the rate of tumbling.

The archetype of bacterial swimming is represented by the well-studied model organism Escherichia coli. With its peritrichous flagellation, E. coli performs a run-and-tumble swimming pattern, as shown in the diagram on the right. CCW rotation of the flagellar motors leads to flagellar bundle formation that pushes the cell in a forward run, parallel to the long axis of the cell. CW rotation disassembles the bundle and the cell rotates randomly (tumbling). After the tumbling event, straight swimming is recovered in a new direction. That is, CCW rotation results in steady motion and CW rotation in tumbling; CCW rotation in a given direction is maintained longer in the presence of molecules of interest (like sugars or aminoacids).

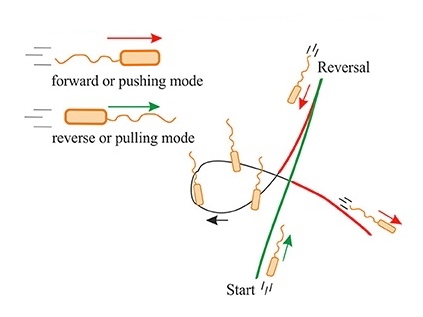
Forward, reverse and turning by buckling Example: Vibrio alginolyticus Adapted from Son et al., 2013

However, the type of swimming movement (propelled by rotation of flagella outside the cell body) varies significantly with the species and number/distribution of flagella on the cell body. For example, the marine bacterium Vibrio alginolyticus, with its single polar flagellum, swims in a cyclic, three-step (forward, reverse, and flick) pattern. Forward swimming occurs when the flagellum pushes the cell head, while backward swimming is based on the flagellum pulling the head upon motor reversal.

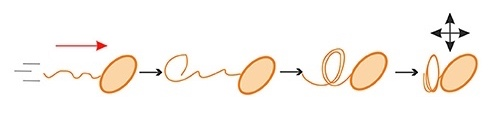
Stop and coil Example: Rhodobacter sphaeroides Adapted from Armitage and Macnab, 1987; Armitage et al., 1999.

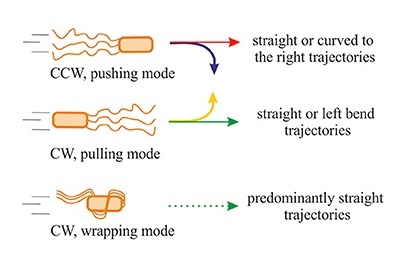
Push, pull and wrap Example: Pseudomonas putida Adapted from Hintsche et al., 2017.

Besides these 180° reversals, the cells can reorient (a "flick") by an angle around 90°, referred to as turning by buckling. Rhodobacter sphaeroides with its subpolar monotrichous flagellation, represents yet another motility strategy: the flagellum only rotates in one direction, and it stops and coils against the cell body from time to time, leading to cell body reorientations, In the soil bacterium Pseudomonas putida, a tuft of helical flagella is attached to its posterior pole. P. putida alternates between three swimming modes: pushing, pulling, and wrapping.

In the pushing mode, the rotating flagella (assembled in a bundle or as an open tuft of individual filaments) drive the motion from the rear end of the cell body. The trajectories are either straight or, in the vicinity of a solid surface, curved to the right, due to hydrodynamic interaction of the cell with the surface. The direction of curvature indicates that pushers are driven by a left-handed helix turning in CCW direction. In the pulling mode, the rotating flagellar bundle is pointing ahead. In this case the trajectories are either straight or with a tendency to bend to the left, indicating that pullers swim by turning a left-handed helical bundle in CW direction. Finally, P. putida can swim by wrapping the filament bundle around its cell body, with the posterior pole pointing in the direction of motion. In that case, the flagellar bundle takes the form of a left-handed helix that turns in CW direction, and the trajectories are predominantly straight.

=== Swarming ===
Swarming motility is a rapid (2–10 μm/s) and coordinated translocation of a bacterial population across solid or semi-solid surfaces, and is an example of bacterial multicellularity and swarm behaviour. Swarming motility was first reported in 1972 by Jorgen Henrichsen.

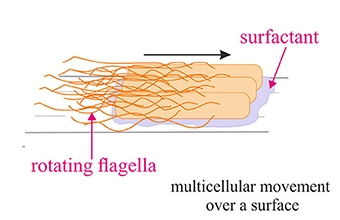
Swarming of bacteria Adapted from: Kearns (2010)

The transition from swimming to swarming mobility is usually associated with an increase in the number of flagella per cell, accompanied by cell elongation. Experiments with Proteus mirabilis showed that swarming requires contact between cells: swarming cells move in side-by-side groups called rafts, which dynamically add or lose cells: when a cell is left behind the raft, its movement stops after a short time; when a group of cells moving in a raft make contact with a stationary cell, it is reactivated and incorporated into the raft. More recently, Swiecicki and coworkers designed a polymer microfluidic system to confine E. coli cells in a quasi-two-dimensional layer of motility buffer in order to study different behaviors of cells transitioning from swimming to swarming movement. For this, they forced E. coli planktonic cells into a swarming-cell-phenotype by inhibiting cell division (leading to cell elongation) and by deletion of the chemosensory system (leading to smooth swimming cells that do not tumble). The increase of bacterial density inside the channel led to the formation of progressively larger rafts. Cells colliding with the raft contributed to increase its size, while cells moving at a velocity different from the mean velocity within the raft separated from it.

Cell trajectories and flagellar motion during swarming was thoroughly studied for E. coli, in combination with fluorescently labeled flagella. The authors described four different types of tracks during bacterial swarming: forward movement, reversals, lateral movement, and stalls. In forward movement, the long axis of the cell, the flagellar bundle and the direction of movement are aligned, and propulsion is similar to the propulsion of a freely swimming cell. In a reversal, the flagellar bundle loosens, with the filaments in the bundle changing from their "normal form" (left-handed helices) into a "curly" form of right-handed helices with lower pitch and amplitude. Without changing its orientation, the cell body moves backwards through the loosened bundle. The bundle re-forms from curly filaments on the opposite pole of the cell body, and the filaments eventually relax back into their normal form. Lateral motion can be caused by collisions with other cells or by a motor reversal. Finally, stalled cells are paused but the flagella continue spinning and pumping fluid in front of the swarm, usually at the swarm edge.

=== Twitching ===
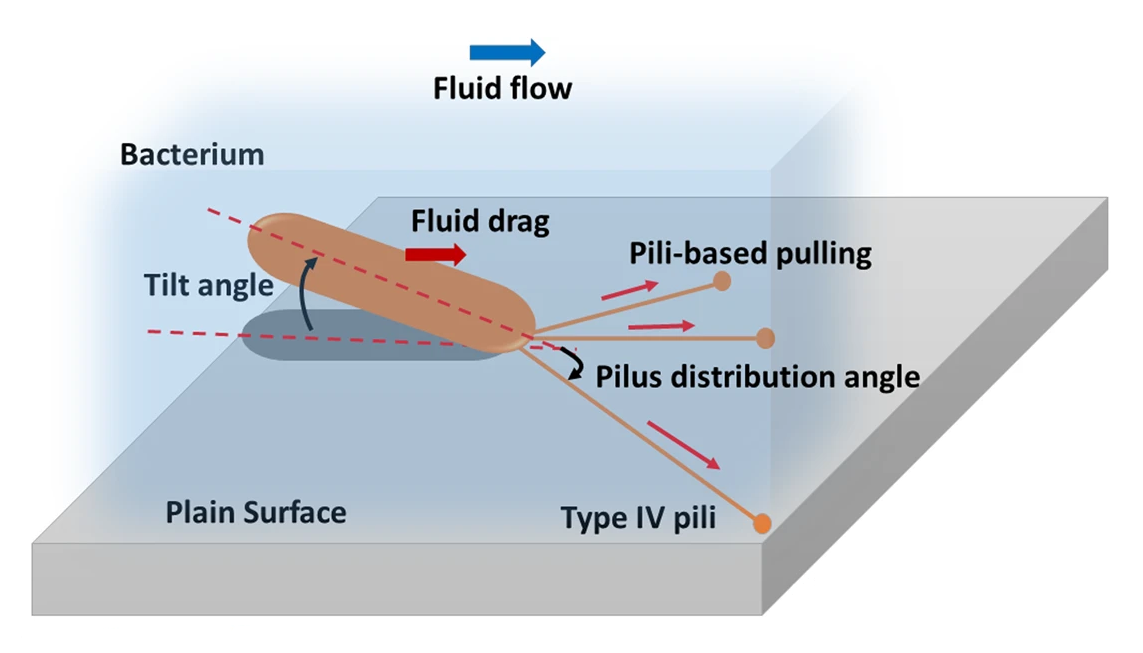
Bacterial twitching

Twitching motility is a form of crawling bacterial motility used to move over surfaces. Twitching is mediated by the activity of hair-like filaments called type IV pili which extend from the cell's exterior, bind to surrounding solid substrates and retract, pulling the cell forwards in a manner similar to the action of a grappling hook. The name twitching motility is derived from the characteristic jerky and irregular motions of individual cells when viewed under the microscope.

A bacterial biofilm is a bacterial community attached into a surface through extracellular polymeric materials. Prior to biofilm formation, bacteria may need to deposit on the surface from their planktonic state. After bacteria deposit on surfaces they may "twitch" or crawl over the surface using appendages called type IV pili to "explore" the substratum to find suitable sites for growth and thus biofilm formation. Pili emanate from bacterial surface and they can be up to several micrometres long (though they are nanometres in diameter). Bacterial twitching occurs through cycles of polymerization and depolymerization of type IV pili. Polymerization causes the pilus to elongate and eventually attaching into surfaces. Depolymerization makes the pilus retract and detach from the surfaces. Pili retraction produces pulling forces on the bacterium, which will be pulled in the direction of the vector sum of the pili forces, resulting in a jerky movement. A typical type IV pilus can produce a force exceeding 100 piconewtons and then a bundle of pili can produce pulling forces up to several nanonewtons. Bacteria may use pili not only for twitching but also for cell-cell interactions, surface sensing, and DNA uptake.

=== Gliding ===
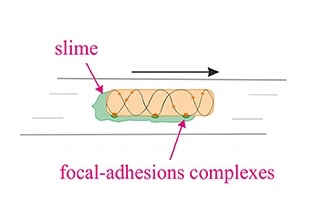
Bacterial gliding Focal adhesion model Adapted from: Islam and Mignot (2015)

Gliding motility is a type of translocation that is independent of propulsive structures such as flagella or pili. Gliding allows microorganisms to travel along the surface of low aqueous films. The mechanisms of this motility are only partially known. The speed of gliding varies between organisms, and the reversal of direction is seemingly regulated by some sort of internal clock. For example, the apicomplexans are able to travel at fast rates between 1–10 μm/s. In contrast Myxococcus xanthus, a slime bacterium, can glide at a rate of 5 μm/min. In myxobacteria individual bacteria move together to form waves of cells that then differentiate to form fruiting bodies containing spores. Myxobacteria move only when on solid surfaces, unlike say E. coli, which is motile in liquid or solid media.

=== Non-motile ===
Non-motile species lack the ability and structures that would allow them to propel themselves, under their own power, through their environment. When non-motile bacteria are cultured in a stab tube, they only grow along the stab line. If the bacteria are mobile, the line will appear diffuse and extend into the medium.

== Bacterial taxis: Directed motion ==
Bacteria are said to exhibit taxis if they move in a manner directed toward or away from some stimulus in their environment. This behaviour allows bacteria to reposition themselves in relation to the stimulus. Different types of taxis can be distinguished according to the nature of the stimulus controlling the directed movement, such as chemotaxis (chemical gradients like glucose), aerotaxis (oxygen), phototaxis (light), thermotaxis (heat), and magnetotaxis (magnetic fields).

=== Chemotaxis ===
The overall movement of a bacterium can be the result of alternating tumble and swim phases. As a result, the trajectory of a bacterium swimming in a uniform environment will form a random walk with relatively straight swims interrupted by random tumbles that reorient the bacterium. Bacteria such as E. coli are unable to choose the direction in which they swim, and are unable to swim in a straight line for more than a few seconds due to rotational diffusion; in other words, bacteria "forget" the direction in which they are going. By repeatedly evaluating their course, and adjusting if they are moving in the wrong direction, bacteria can direct their random walk motion toward favorable locations.

In the presence of a chemical gradient bacteria will chemotax, or direct their overall motion based on the gradient. If the bacterium senses that it is moving in the correct direction (toward attractant/away from repellent), it will keep swimming in a straight line for a longer time before tumbling; however, if it is moving in the wrong direction, it will tumble sooner. Bacteria like E. coli use temporal sensing to decide whether their situation is improving or not, and in this way, find the location with the highest concentration of attractant, detecting even small differences in concentration.

This biased random walk is a result of simply choosing between two methods of random movement; namely tumbling and straight swimming. The helical nature of the individual flagellar filament is critical for this movement to occur. The protein structure that makes up the flagellar filament, flagellin, is conserved among all flagellated bacteria. Vertebrates seem to have taken advantage of this fact by possessing an immune receptor (TLR5) designed to recognize this conserved protein.

As in many instances in biology, there are bacteria that do not follow this rule. Many bacteria, such as Vibrio, are monoflagellated and have a single flagellum at one pole of the cell. Their method of chemotaxis is different. Others possess a single flagellum that is kept inside the cell wall. These bacteria move by spinning the whole cell, which is shaped like a corkscrew.

The ability of marine microbes to navigate toward chemical hotspots can determine their nutrient uptake and has the potential to affect the cycling of elements in the ocean. The link between bacterial navigation and nutrient cycling highlights the need to understand how chemotaxis functions in the context of marine microenvironments. Chemotaxis hinges on the stochastic binding/unbinding of molecules with surface receptors, the transduction of this information through an intracellular signaling cascade, and the activation and control of flagellar motors. The intrinsic randomness of these processes is a central challenge that cells must deal with in order to navigate, particularly under dilute conditions where noise and signal are similar in magnitude. Such conditions are ubiquitous in the ocean, where nutrient concentrations are often extremely low and subject to rapid variation in space (e.g., particulate matter, nutrient plumes) and time (e.g., diffusing sources, fluid mixing).

The fine-scale interactions between marine bacteria and both dissolved and particulate organic matter underpin marine biogeochemistry, thereby supporting productivity and influencing carbon storage and sequestration in the planet's oceans. It has been historically very difficult to characterize marine environments on the microscales that are most relevant to individual bacteria. Rather, research efforts have typically sampled much larger volumes of water and made comparisons from one sampling site to another. However, at the length scales relevant to individual microbes, the ocean is an intricate and dynamic landscape of nutrient patches, at times too small to be mixed by turbulence. The capacity for microbes to actively navigate these structured environments using chemotaxis can strongly influence their nutrient uptake. Although some work has examined time-dependent chemical profiles, past investigations of chemotaxis using E. coli and other model organisms have routinely examined steady chemical gradients strong enough to elicit a discernible chemotactic response. However, the typical chemical gradients wild marine bacteria encounter are often very weak, ephemeral in nature, and with low background concentrations. Shallow gradients are relevant for marine bacteria because, in general, gradients become weaker as one moves away from the source. Yet, detecting such gradients at distance has tremendous value, because they point toward nutrient sources. Shallow gradients are important precisely because they can be used to navigate to regions in the vicinity of sources where gradients become steep, concentrations are high, and bacteria can acquire resources at a high rate.

=== Phototaxis ===
Phototaxis is a kind of taxis, or locomotory movement, that occurs when a whole organism moves towards or away from a stimulus of light. This is advantageous for phototrophic organisms as they can orient themselves most efficiently to receive light for photosynthesis. Phototaxis is called positive if the movement is in the direction of increasing light intensity and negative if the direction is opposite.

Two types of positive phototaxis are observed in prokaryotes. The first is called "scotophobotaxis" (from the word "scotophobia"), which is observed only under a microscope. This occurs when a bacterium swims by chance out of the area illuminated by the microscope. Entering darkness signals the cell to reverse flagella rotation direction and reenter the light. The second type of phototaxis is true phototaxis, which is a directed movement up a gradient to an increasing amount of light. This is analogous to positive chemotaxis except that the attractant is light rather than a chemical.

Phototactic responses are observed in a number of bacteria and archae, such as Serratia marcescens. Photoreceptor proteins are light-sensitive proteins involved in the sensing and response to light in a variety of organisms. Some examples are bacteriorhodopsin and bacteriophytochromes in some bacteria. See also: phytochrome and phototropism.

Most prokaryotes (bacteria and archaea) are unable to sense the direction of light, because at such a small scale it is very difficult to make a detector that can distinguish a single light direction. Still, prokaryotes can measure light intensity and move in a light-intensity gradient. Some gliding filamentous prokaryotes can even sense light direction and make directed turns, but their phototactic movement is very slow. Some bacteria and archaea are phototactic.

In most cases the mechanism of phototaxis is a biased random walk, analogous to bacterial chemotaxis. Halophilic archaea, such as Halobacterium salinarum, use sensory rhodopsins (SRs) for phototaxis. Rhodopsins are 7 transmembrane proteins that bind retinal as a chromophore. Light triggers the isomerization of retinal, which leads to phototransductory signalling via a two-component phosphotransfer relay system. Halobacterium salinarum has two SRs, SRI and SRII, which signal via the transducer proteins HtrI and HtrII (halobacterial transducers for SRs I and II), respectively. The downstream signalling in phototactic archaebacteria involves CheA, a histidine kinase, which phosphorylates the response regulator, CheY. Phosphorylated CheY induces swimming reversals. The two SRs in Halobacterium have different functions. SRI acts as an attractant receptor for orange light and, through a two-photon reaction, a repellent receptor for near-UV light, while SRII is a repellent receptor for blue light. Depending on which receptor is expressed, if a cell swims up or down a steep light gradient, the probability of flagellar switch will be low. If light intensity is constant or changes in the wrong direction, a switch in the direction of flagellar rotation will reorient the cell in a new, random direction. As the length of the tracks is longer when the cell follows a light gradient, cells will eventually get closer to or further away from the light source. This strategy does not allow orientation along the light vector and only works if a steep light gradient is present (i.e. not in open water).

Some cyanobacteria (e.g. Anabaena, Synechocystis) can slowly orient along a light vector. This orientation occurs in filaments or colonies, but only on surfaces and not in suspension. The filamentous cyanobacterium Synechocystis is capable of both positive and negative two-dimensional phototactic orientation. The positive response is probably mediated by a bacteriophytochrome photoreceptor, TaxD1. This protein has two chromophore-binding GAF domains, which bind biliverdin chromophore, and a C-terminal domain typical for bacterial taxis receptors (MCP signal domain). TaxD1 also has two N-terminal transmembrane segments that anchor the protein to the membrane. The photoreceptor and signalling domains are cytoplasmic and signal via a CheA/CheY-type signal transduction system to regulate motility by type IV pili. TaxD1 is localized at the poles of the rod-shaped cells of Synechococcus elongatus, similarly to MCP containing chemosensory receptors in bacteria and archaea. How the steering of the filaments is achieved is not known. The slow steering of these cyanobacterial filaments is the only light-direction sensing behaviour prokaryotes could evolve owing to the difficulty in detecting light direction at this small scale.

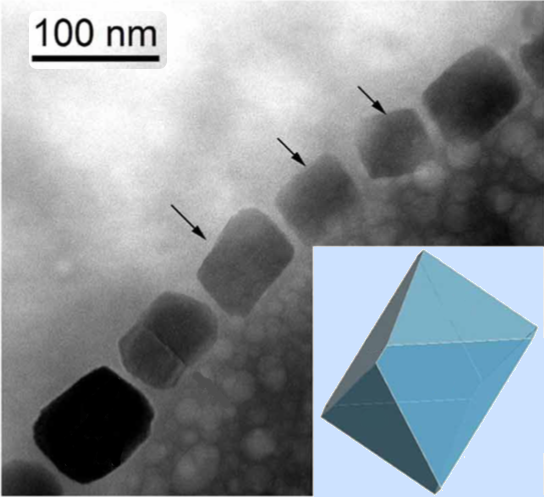
Magnetosome chain with octahedral habits modelled lower right

=== Magnetotaxis ===
Magnetotactic bacteria orient themselves along the magnetic field lines of Earth's magnetic field. This alignment is believed to aid these organisms in reaching regions of optimal oxygen concentration. To perform this task, these bacteria have biomineralised organelles called magnetosomes that contain magnetic crystals. The biological phenomenon of microorganisms tending to move in response to the environment's magnetic characteristics is known as magnetotaxis. However, this term is misleading in that every other application of the term taxis involves a stimulus-response mechanism. In contrast to the magnetoreception of animals, the bacteria contain fixed magnets that force the bacteria into alignment—even dead cells are dragged into alignment, just like a compass needle.

=== Escape response ===
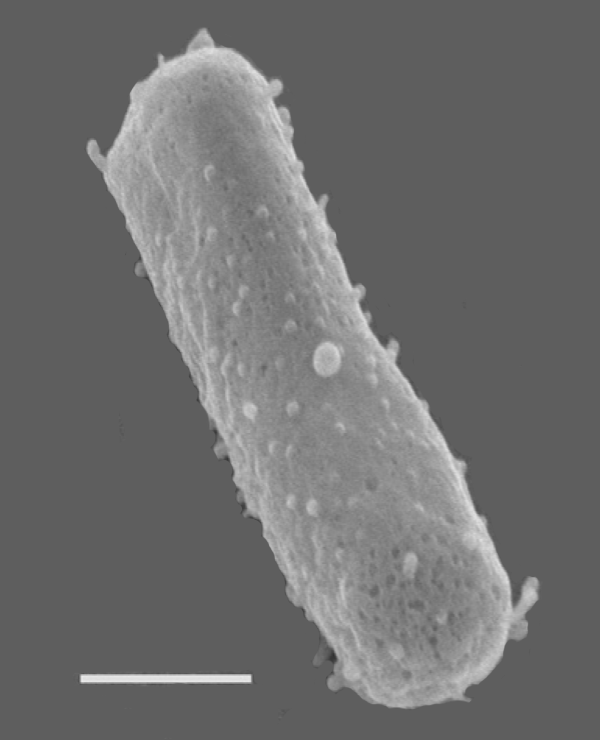
Halobacterium salinarum NRC-1 Size bar = 270 nm

An escape response is a form of negative taxis. Stimuli that have the potential to harm or kill demand rapid detection. This is fundamentally distinct from navigation or exploration, in terms of the timescales available for response. Most motile species harbour a form of phobic or emergency response distinct from their steady state locomotion. Escape reactions are not strictly oriented—but commonly involve backward movement, sometimes with a negatively geotactic component. In bacteria and archaea, action potential-like phenomena have been observed in biofilms and also single cells such as cable bacteria. The archaeon Halobacterium salinarium shows a photophobic response characterized by a 180° reversal of its swimming direction induced by a reversal in the direction of flagellar rotation. At least some aspects of this response are likely mediated by changes in membrane potential by bacteriorhodopsin, a light-driven proton pump. Action potential-like phenomena in prokaryotes are dissimilar from classical eukaryotic action potentials. The former are less reproducible, slower and exhibit a broader distribution in pulse amplitude and duration.

=== Other taxes ===
- Aerotaxis is the response of an organism to variation in oxygen concentration, and is mainly found in aerobic bacteria.
- Energy taxis is the orientation of bacteria towards conditions of optimal metabolic activity by sensing the internal energetic conditions of cell. Therefore, in contrast to chemotaxis (taxis towards or away from a specific extracellular compound), energy taxis responds on an intracellular stimulus (e.g. proton motive force, activity of NDH- 1) and requires metabolic activity.

== Mathematical modelling ==
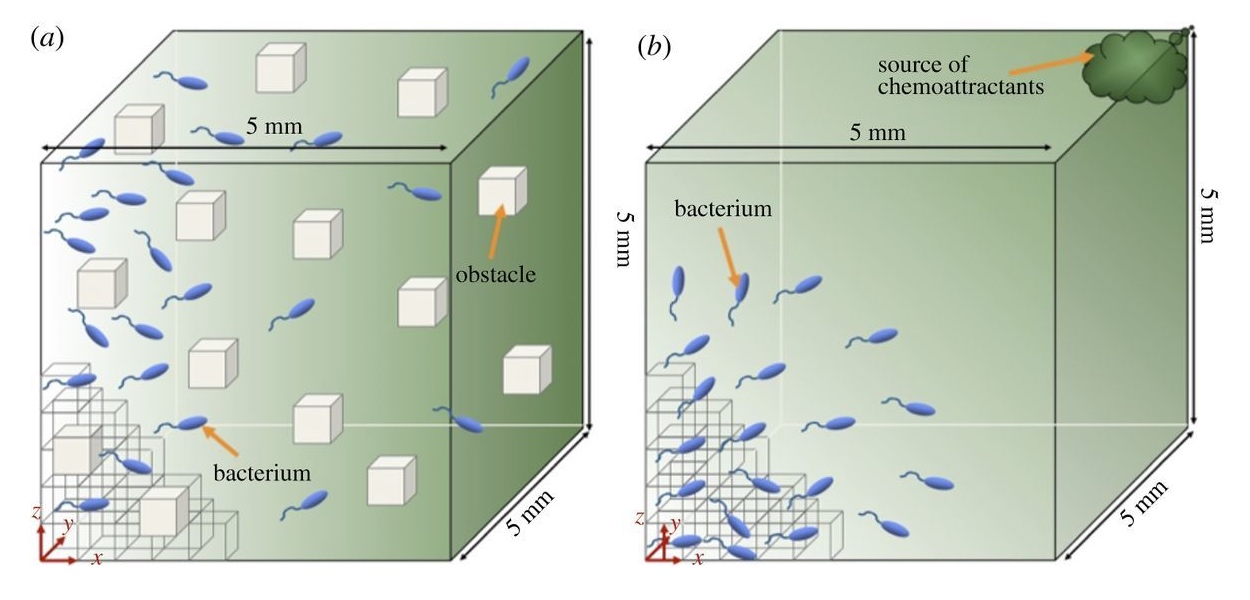
Simulation by the bacteria network simulator BNSim of the swimming behaviour of Serratia marcescens (a) without, and (b) with, the presence of a chemoattractant

The mathematical models used to describe the bacterial swimming dynamics can be classified into two categories. The first category is based on a microscopic (i.e. cell-level) view of bacterial swimming through a set of equations where each equation describes the state of a single agent. The second category provides a macroscopic (i.e. population-level) view via continuum-based partial differential equations that capture the dynamics of population density over space and time, without considering the intracellular characteristics directly.

Among the present models, Schnitzer uses the Smoluchowski equation to describe the biased random walk of the bacteria during chemotaxis to search for food. To focus on a detailed description of the motion taking place during one run interval of the bacteria, de Gennes derives the average run length travelled by bacteria during one counterclockwise interval. Along the same direction, to consider the environmental condition affecting the biased random walk of bacteria, Croze and his co-workers study experimentally and theoretically the effect of concentration of soft agar on chemotaxis of bacteria.

To study the effect of obstacles (another environmental condition) on the motion of bacteria, Chepizhko and his co-workers study the motion of self-propelled particles in a heterogeneous two-dimensional environment and show that the mean square displacement of particles is dependent on the density of obstacles and the particle turning speed. Building on these models, Cates highlights that bacterial dynamics does not always obey detailed balance, which means it is a biased diffusion process depending on the environmental conditions. Moreover, Ariel and his co-workers focus on diffusion of bacteria and show that the bacteria perform super-diffusion during swarming on a surface.

== See also ==
- Cyanobacterial motility
- Protist locomotion
