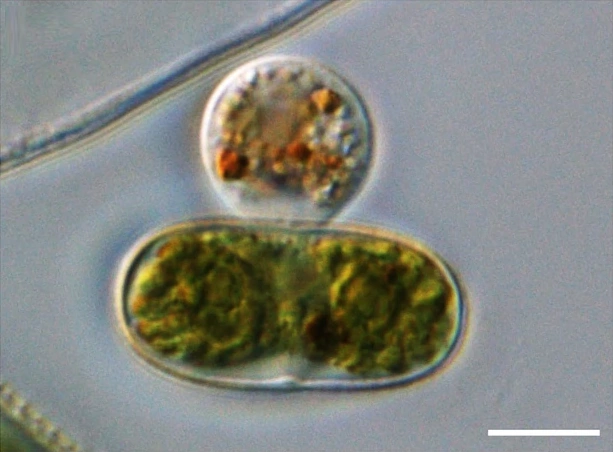
- Orciraptor agilis attacking an Actinotaenium cell.

Scientific classification
- Domain: Eukaryota
- Supergroup: Rhizaria
- Phylum: Cercozoa
- Subphylum: Filosa
- Order: Glissomonadida
- Family: Viridiraptoridae
- Genus: Orciraptor; Hess and Melkonian 2013
- Species: O. agilis

Binomial name
- Orciraptor agilis Hess and Melkonian 2013

= Orciraptor =

Genus of predatorial protists

Orciraptor is a genus of heterotrophic protists, containing the single species Orciraptor agilis. It belongs to the family Viridiraptoridae and order Glissomonadida in the phylum Cercozoa.

== Morphology ==
Orciraptor are unicellular organisms with two flagella: a short anterior and a long posterior. The cell nucleus is spherical, surrounded by several Golgi dictyosomes. They have cortical extrusomes homogenously distributed in the cell's periphery.

In particular, Orciraptor agilis are colourless gliding cells that in ventral view are compact in shape, measuring 8–14 μm in length, and in lateral view are oviform or tear-shaped, measuring 12–20 μm in length. The posterior flagellum measures an average of 44 μm, while the anterior measures an average of 15 μm and is usually 33–35 % the length of the posterior flagellum. Their spherical nucleus averages 5 μm in diameter, while the nucleolus averages 3 μm, the mitochondria measure 1.5 × 0.7 μm, and the Golgi bodies appear 1.5–3 in length and 0.5 μm in width. In gliding cells, about six Golgi bodies can be seen surrounding the nucleus in one plane. The cortical extrusomes appear at a density of 25 to 30 granules per 10 μm² of cell surface. Up to about five contractile vacuoles are simultaneously recognisable. The crystals present in the cytoplasm, as is common in the family, are spherical or slightly elongated, measuring 0.7–1 μm, and accumulate in large numbers during starvation, which makes the cells glisten when seen under a differential interference contrast microscope.

== Ecology and behavior ==
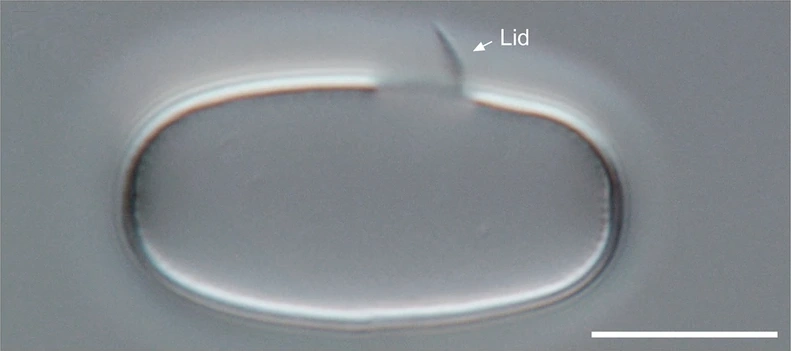
Image 1. Empty Actinotaenium cell excised by Orciraptor, with lid attached.

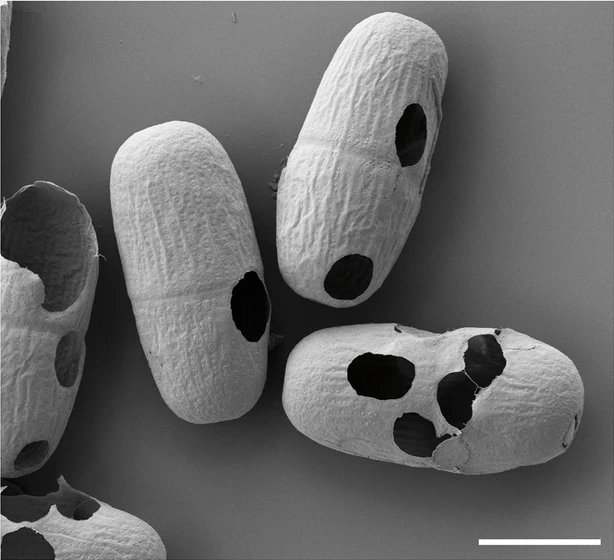
Image 2. Actinotaenium cells perforated by Orciraptor.

Orciraptor are predominantly gliding flagellates, rarely swimming flagellates and surface-attached amoebae. During gliding, their anterior flagellum moves by waving or flapping regularly, which causes a slight rotation or a periodic jiggling of the cell. Cells that are starving glide fast and smoothly. They feed through phagocytosis on a wide range of dead or morbid eukaryotic cells, such as diverse green algae. The behaviors of digestion and reproduction through binary fission in the free-living state are very common, but they are also capable of invading certain algae to digest and reproduce.

In particular, Orciraptor agilis has a gliding velocity averaging 12 μm per second, and a flapping frequency of the anterior flagellum of 1.4–2.3 beats per second at a temperature of 20°C. It is capable of perforating algal cell walls in a circular manner, often leaving behind cell wall lids attached to empty algal cells (see image 1). It leaves elliptical holes on the cell wall (see image 2), measuring 9–11 μm in the largest dimension, seen in Mougeotia prey. It has at least three strategies of feeding:

1. Extracting cell contents from dead or morbid cells of diverse freshwater algae, such as Zygnematophyceae (Mougeotia, Spirogyra, Zygnema) and Chlorophyceae (Oedogoniales, Volvocales).
2. Removing whole cells from gelatinous colonies, such as in Volvocales and Tetrasporales.
3. Invading dead cells of certain size, such as in certain Zygnematales and Oedogoniales, digesting and propagating in their interior.

== Etymology ==
The name Orciraptor (from Latin orcus 'Orcus' and raptor 'thief'), meaning 'robber related to the underworld or death', refers to its preference for feeding from the contents of dead cells. The epithet agilis (from Latin agilis 'agile') is due to its remarkably fast and continuous gliding movement of the cells.
