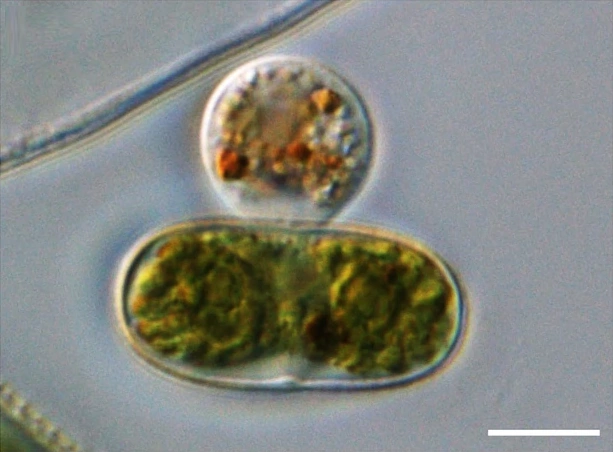
- Orciraptor agilis attacking an Actinotaenium cell.

Scientific classification
- Domain: Eukaryota
- Clade: Sar
- Clade: Rhizaria
- Phylum: Cercozoa
- Subphylum: Filosa
- Order: Glissomonadida
- Family: Viridiraptoridae; Hess & Melkonian 2013

Type genus
- Viridiraptor Hess & Melkonian 2013

Genera
- Orciraptor; Viridiraptor

Diversity
- 2 species

Synonyms
- Clade X

= Viridiraptoridae =

Family of predatorial protists

Viridiraptoridae, previously known as Clade X, is a clade of heterotrophic protists in the phylum Cercozoa. They are a family of glissomonads, a group containing a vast, mostly undescribed diversity of soil and freshwater organisms.

== Morphology and behavior ==
Members of Viridiraptoridae are unicellular biflagellates with naked cells, mostly rigid and variously shaped, without any rostrum or bulge. During the life cycle they can present two different states: a large flagellate state for moving, capable of changing into a surface-attached amoeboid state for feeding. The flagellate state exceeds 10 μm, unlike most known glissomonad families. The amoeboid state retains flagella and shows a bridge-like morphology, with several different adhesion sites.

Each cell contains a single vesicular nucleus close to flagellar apparatus, and has an apical position in the flagellate state. The nucleolus is spherical, roughly central, occasionally showing lacunae. The Golgi dictyosomes are close to the nuclear envelope. The cytoplasm is colourless, or opaque due to the presence of globules, granules and crystals inside of it. The feeding stages are seen containing several globules of certain refractivity. The crystal-like structures are restricted to starving cells and are observed in various shapes:

1. Small, spherical or slightly elongate, glistening particles, between 0.5 and 1 μm.
2. Slender, fusiform or needle-like rods, often 2 to 3 μm in length, rarely up to around 6 μm.

There are several mitochondria scattered throughout cell, slightly elongate. There are spherical extrusomes, around 0.5 μm in diameter, directly beneath plasma membrane, but not seen in the pseudopodia. Several contractile vacuoles appear in the periphery, measuring usually less than 2 μm in diameter.

The flagella are naked, heterodynamic (= with different movement each), and arise very close to each other in a slightly acute angle or a right angle. The cells glide only on their posterior flagellum, which is mostly longer than the anterior flagellum. While gliding, the cell body does not attach to the substrate. The flapping motion of the anterior flagellum often causes motions of the cell body while gliding (such as rotating, jiggling or vibrating). The cells can perform a fluttering swimming locomotion to some extent; this involves both flagella.

== Ecology ==
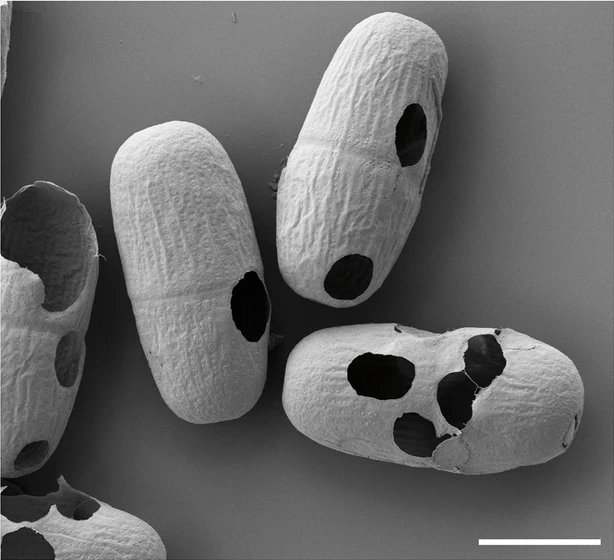
Actinotaenium cells perforated by an Orciraptor.

Viridiraptoridae are heterotrophic protists that feed by phagocytosis on live and dead eukaryotic cells. They are capable of degrading the cell wall of their prey to feed exclusively on the protoplast material (as seen in certain green algae; see image). They are not bacterivorous. They propagate by binary fission. No plasmodia have been observed. They inhabit freshwater-fed ecosystems.

== Classification ==
They were proposed as glissomonads. Later, other authors suggested that it should be classified outside of glissomonads and even could be related to family Pseudosporidae and should be in order Pseudosporida along with Clade Y. They are generally considered glissomonads.

Two genera, both monotypic (with one species each), comprise the family:

- Orciraptor Hess & Melkonian 2013
  - Orciraptor agilis Hess & Melkonian 2013
- Viridiraptor Hess & Melkonian 2013
  - Viridiraptor invadens Hess & Melkonian 2013
