= Cyanobacterial motility =

Ability of cyanobacteria to move independently using metabolic energy

Cyanobacterial motility is the ability of cyanobacteria to move independently using metabolic energy. Cyanobacterial motility, primarily through gliding, twitching, or buoyancy regulation, is an important adaptation for navigating heterogeneous environments, optimizing resource acquisition, and supporting community dynamics. The ability to move independently can enhance survival, colonization, and ecological interactions. It comes with trade-offs, including high energy costs, limited speed, and environmental dependencies. These characteristics reflect cyanobacteria's evolutionary balance between mobility and resource conservation in diverse habitats, from marine ecosystems to soil crusts.

== Types of movement ==
No known cyanobacteria possess flagella. However, other types of movement occurring on solid surfaces include twitching, gliding and sliding, which are all independent of flagella.

=== Twitching ===
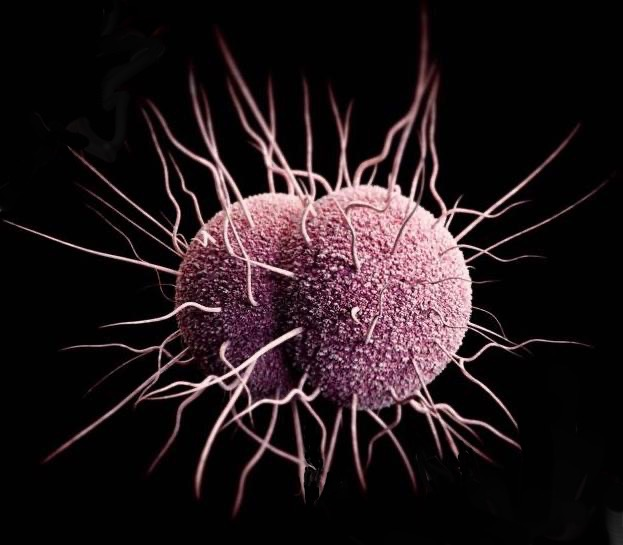
Type IV pili on a bacterium (though not a cyanobacterium) – artistic recreation based on SEM

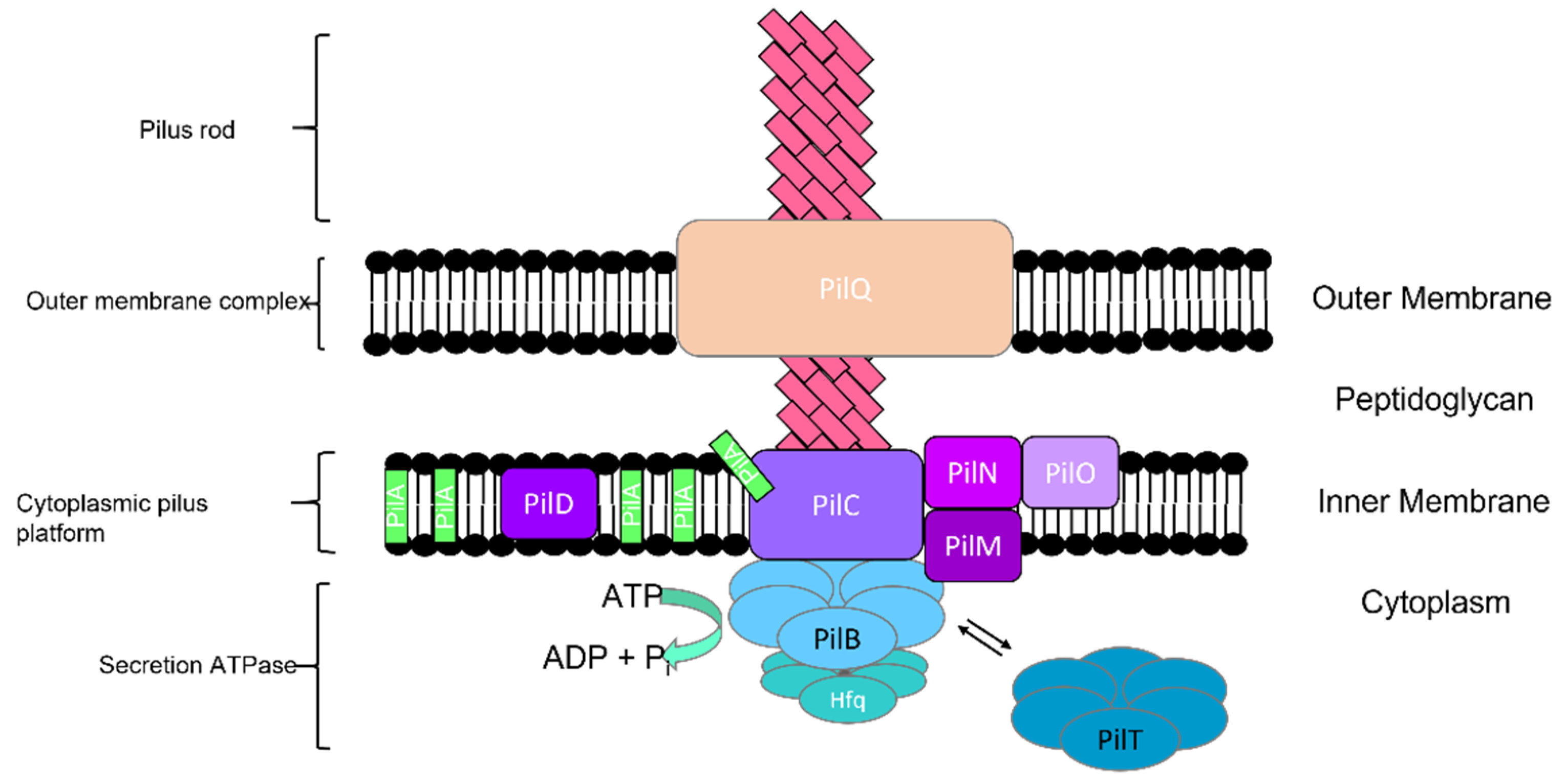
Type IV pilus in cyanobacteria

Twitching motility is a form of crawling bacterial motility used to move over surfaces. Twitching is translocation over a moist surface, which requires an extension, tethering, and then retraction activities of pili. A pilus (Latin for 'hair', plural pili) is a hair-like cell-surface appendage found on many bacteria and archaea. Dozens of these structures can exist on the bacterial and archaeal surface. They are fragile and constantly replaced. There are different types of phili, classified by their function. Some pili, called type IV pili (T4P), are responsible for the motile forces in twitching. These hair-like filaments extend from the cell's exterior, bind to surrounding solid substrates and retract, pulling the cell forwards in a manner similar to the action of a grappling hook. Movement produced by type IV pili is typically jerky when viewed under the microscope, so it is called twitching, as opposed to smoother forms of bacterial motility such as that produced by flagella.

Twitching occurs in many gram-negative bacteria including cyanobacteria, especially in Synechocystis sp.

=== Gliding ===
Many filamentous species move on surfaces by gliding, a form of locomotion where no physical appendages are seen to aid movement. The actual mechanism behind gliding is not fully understood, although over a century has elapsed since its discovery. One theory suggests that in cyanobacterial gliding motion the motive force to drive the cell forwards may come from focal adhesion complexes, mediated by the continuous secretion of polysaccharides through pores on individual cells. Another theory suggests that gliding motion involves the use of type IV pili, polymeric assemblies of the protein pilin, as the driving engines of motion. However, it is not clear how the action of these pili would lead to motion, with some suggesting they retract, while others suggest they push, to generate forces. Other scholars have suggested surface waves generated by the contraction of a fibril layer as the mechanism behind gliding motion in Oscillatoria. Recent work also suggests that shape fluctuations and capillary forces could be involved in gliding motion.

Many species of cyanobacteria are capable of gliding. Gliding is a form of cell movement that differs from crawling or swimming in that it does not rely on any obvious external organ or change in cell shape and it occurs only in the presence of a substrate. Gliding in filamentous cyanobacteria appears to be powered by a "slime jet" mechanism, in which the cells extrude a gel that expands quickly as it hydrates providing a propulsion force, although some unicellular cyanobacteria use type IV pili for gliding. Individual cells in a trichome have two sets of pores for extruding slime. Each set is organized in a ring at the cell septae and extrudes slime at an acute angle. The sets extrude slime in opposite directions and so only one set is likely to be activated during gliding. An alternative hypothesis is that the cells use contractive elements that produce undulations running over the surface inside the slime tube like an earthworm. The trichomes rotate in a spiral fashion, the angle of which corresponds with the pitch angle of Castenholz's contractile trichomes.

=== Run and tumble ===
The overall movement of a bacterium can be the result of alternating tumble and swim phases. As a result, the trajectory of a bacterium swimming in a uniform environment will form a random walk with relatively straight swims interrupted by random tumbles that reorient the bacterium. Bacteria can be unable to choose the direction in which they swim, and unable to swim in a straight line for more than a few seconds due to rotational diffusion. In other words, such bacteria "forget" the direction in which they are going. By repeatedly evaluating their course, and adjusting if they are moving in the wrong direction, such bacteria can direct their random walk motion toward favorable locations.

=== Buoyancy regulation ===
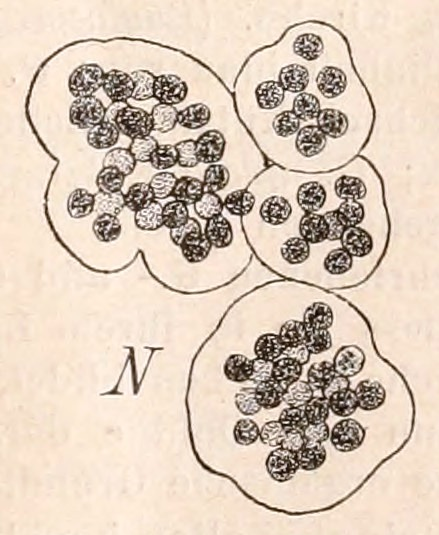
Microcystis floas-aquae

Buoyancy regulation allows some ocean microorganisms to move vertically in the water column. This vertical movement can be a response to environmental stimuli, such as levels of light, nutrients, or oxygen. Or cells with low intracellular nutrient content can settle down to the chemocline while nutrient-rich cells ascend to the sunlit surface layers. Regulating buoyancy can require metabolic energy to create and maintain gas vesicles or other buoyancy-regulating structures. Such passive mechanisms can result in controlled movement, optimizing access to light or nutrients essential for survival.

For example, cyanobacteria like Microcystis use gas vesicles to adjust buoyancy, moving upward toward light for photosynthesis or downward to access nutrients. While not as dynamic as other forms of movement, this vertical migration is a deliberate strategy to navigate their environment. However, some researchers distinguish it as "vertical migration" rather than true motility, as it relies on physical properties rather than active locomotion.

Cyanobacteria have strict light requirements. Too little light can result in insufficient energy production, and in some species may cause the cells to resort to heterotrophic respiration. Too much light can inhibit the cells, decrease photosynthesis efficiency and cause damage by bleaching.

UV radiation is especially deadly for cyanobacteria, with normal solar levels being significantly detrimental for these microorganisms in some cases. Several cyanobacteria have learned to avoid areas with high light intensities as a first line of defence. Transitioning from higher to lower amounts of solar radiation is one of the several ways to avoid solar radiation. Other ways include mat formation, changes in shape to improve self-shading, and the production of extracellular polysaccharides. In order to avoid intensive solar radiation, mobile cyanobacteria can migrate downward into mat communities or go down into water columns.

== Taxis ==
A taxis is the movement of an organism in response to a stimulus such as light, pressure, or the presence of nutrients.

Photomovement – the modulation of cell movement as a function of the incident light – is employed by the cyanobacteria as a means to find optimal light conditions in their environment. There are three types of photomovement: photokinesis, phototaxis and photophobic responses.

Photokinetic microorganisms modulate their gliding speed according to the incident light intensity. For example, the speed with which Phormidium autumnale glides increases linearly with the incident light intensity.

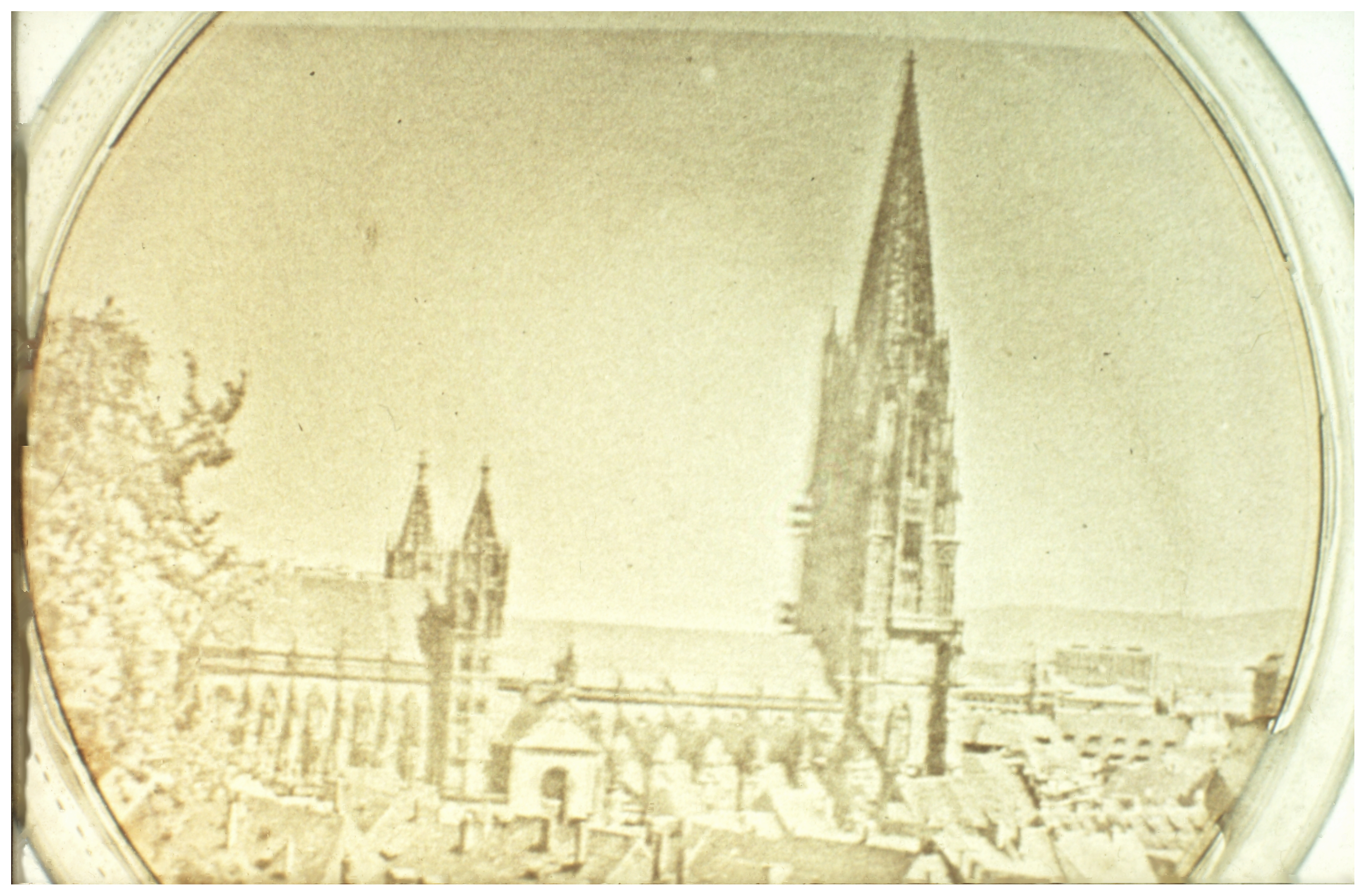
Häder's cyanograph experiment Photographic negative projected onto a Petri dish containing a culture of photophobic filamentous cyanobacteria (Phormidium uncinatum). The trichomes cover the lighter areas of the projection while uncovering the darker areas producing a photographic positive.

Phototactic microorganisms move according to the direction of the light within the environment, such that positively phototactic species will tend to move roughly parallel to the light and towards the light source. Species such as Phormidium uncinatum cannot steer directly towards the light, but rely on random collisions to orient themselves in the right direction, after which they tend to move more towards the light source. Others, such as Anabaena variabilis, can steer by bending the trichome.

Further, photophobic microorganisms respond to spatial and temporal light gradients. A step-up photophobic reaction occurs when an organism enters a brighter area field from a darker one and then reverses direction, thus avoiding the bright light. The opposite reaction, called a step-down reaction, occurs when an organism enters a dark area from a bright area and then reverses direction, thus remaining in the light.

Some cyanobacteria (e.g. Anabaena, Synechocystis) can slowly orient along a light vector. This orientation occurs in filaments or colonies, but only on surfaces and not in suspension.

=== Häder's cyanograph experiment ===
In 1987, Häder demonstrated that trichomes can position themselves quite precisely within their environment through photomovement. In Häder's cyanograph experiment a photographic negative is projected onto a Petri dish containing a culture of Phormidium uncinatum. After a few hours, the trichomes move away from the darker areas onto the lighter areas, forming a photographic positive on the culture. The experiment demonstrates that photomovement is effective not just for discrete light traps, but for minutely patterned, continuously differentiated light fields as well.

== Filamentous cyanobacteria ==
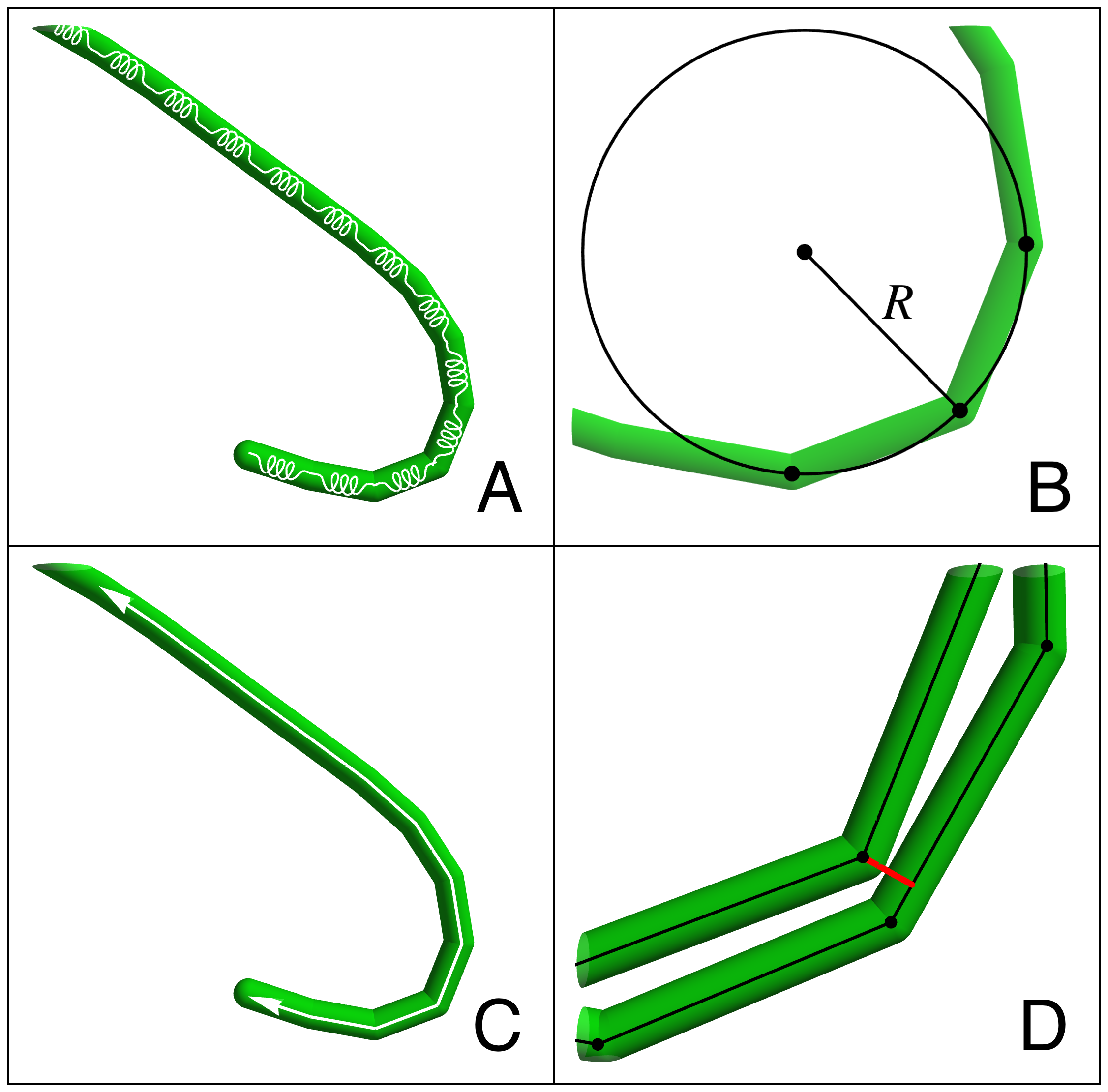
Modeling filamentous cyanobacteria Model components: (A) Trichomes are modeled as thin flexible rods that are discretized into sequences of 50 μm edges. Each edge is loaded with a linear spring. (B) The local bending moment is a function of the radius of curvature. (C) Trichomes can glide along their long axis and reverse their direction of movement photophobically. (D) Trichome collisions are defined between edge-vertex pairs. A vertex that penetrates an edge's volume is repulsed by equal and opposite forces between the pair.

Cyanobacteria are ubiquitous, finding habitats in most water bodies and in extreme environments such as the polar regions, deserts, brine lakes and hot springs. They have also evolved surprisingly complex collective behaviours that lie at the boundary between single-celled and multicellular life. Filamentous cyanobacteria live in long chains of cells that bundle together into larger structures including biofilms, biomats and stromatolites. These large colonies provide a rigid, stable and long-term environment for their communities of bacteria. In addition, cyanobacteria-based biofilms can be used as bioreactors to produce a wide range of chemicals, including biofuels like biodiesel and ethanol. However, despite their importance to the history of life on Earth, and their commercial and environmental potentials, there remain basic questions of how filamentous cyanobacteria move, respond to their environment and self-organize into collective patterns and structures.

Through collective interaction, filamentous cyanobacteria self-organize into colonies or biofilms, symbiotic communities found in a wide variety of ecological niches. Their larger-scale collective structures are characterized by diverse shapes including bundles, vortices and reticulate patterns. Similar patterns have been observed in fossil records. For filamentous cyanobacteria, the mechanics of the filaments is known to contribute to self-organization, for example in determining how one filament will bend when in contact with other filaments or obstacles. Further, biofilms and biomats show some remarkably conserved macro-mechanical properties, typically behaving as viscoelastic materials with a relaxation time of about 20 min.

It has long been known that filamentous cyanobacteria perform surface motions, and that these movements result from type IV pili.

Filamentous cyanobacteria that live in microbial mats often migrate vertically and horizontally within the mat in order to find an optimal niche that balances their light requirements for photosynthesis against their sensitivity to photodamage. For example, the filamentous cyanobacteria Oscillatoria sp. and Spirulina subsalsa found in the hypersaline benthic mats of Guerrero Negro, Mexico migrate downwards into the lower layers during the day in order to escape the intense sunlight and then rise to the surface at dusk. In contrast, the population of Microcoleus chthonoplastes found in hypersaline mats at Salin-de-Giraud, Camargue, France migrate to the upper layer of the mat during the day and are spread homogenously through the mat at night. An in vitro experiment using P. uncinatum also demonstrated this species' tendency to migrate in order to avoid damaging radiation. These migrations are usually the result of some sort of photomovement, although other forms of taxis can also play a role.

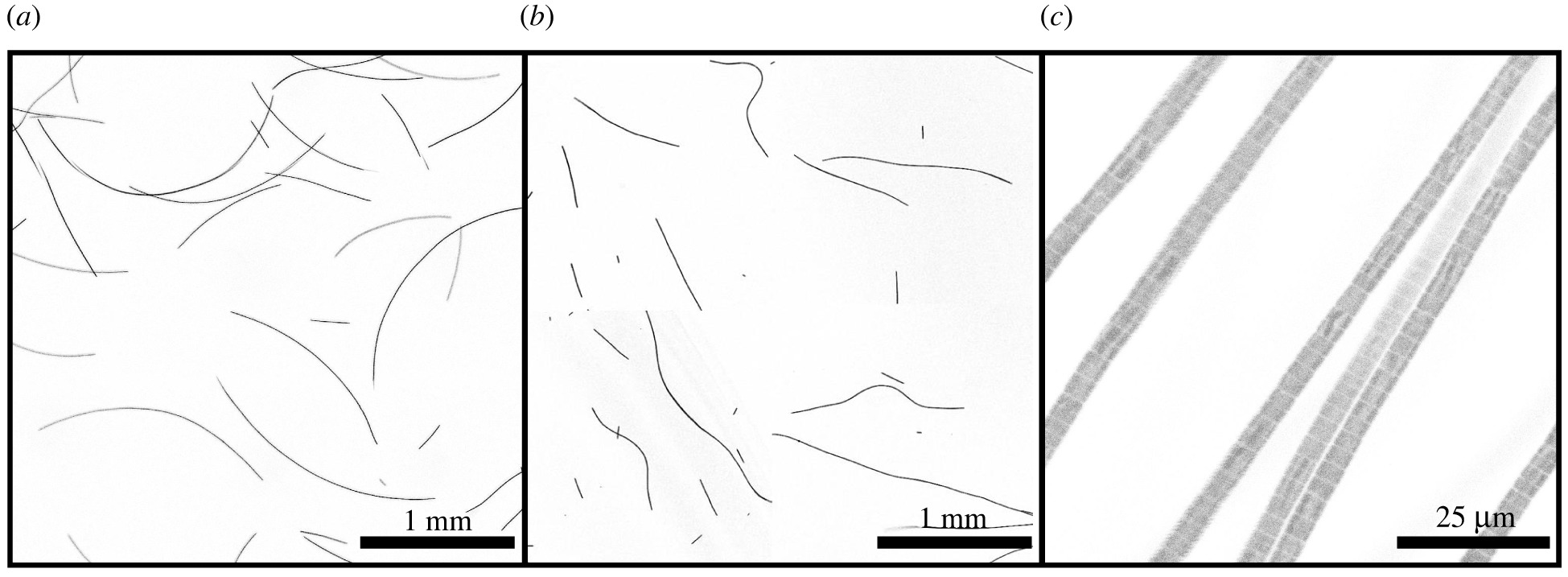
(a) Under ideal conditions active gliding specimens of Oscillatoria lutea appear as long thin curved filaments. (b) When rendered inactive, for example by being briefly cooled, the same filaments adopt a more random shape. (c) Under higher magnification O. lutea is seen to be composed of one-cell-wide strands of connected cells.

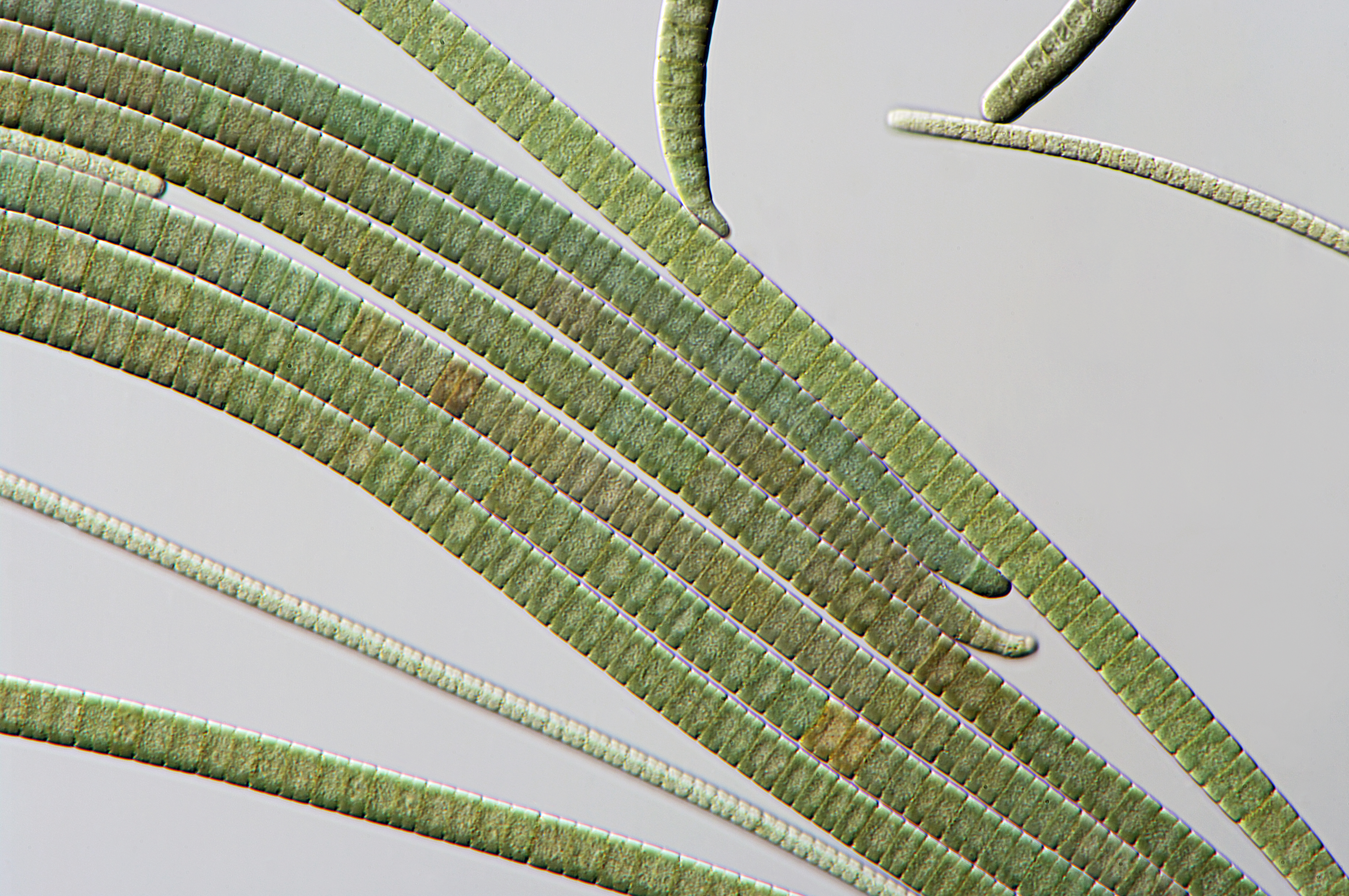
Oscillatoria are capable of a waving motion

The cells appear to coordinate their gliding direction by an electrical potential that establishes polarity in the trichomes, and thus establishes a "head" and the "tail". Trichomes usually reverse their polarity randomly with an average period on the order of minutes to hours. Many species also form a semi-rigid sheath that is left behind as a hollow tube as the trichome moves forward. When the trichome reverses direction, it can move back into the sheath or break out.

Oscillatoria is a genus of filamentous cyanobacterium named after the oscillation in its movement. Filaments in colonies slide back and forth against each other until the whole mass is reoriented to its light source. Oscillatoria is mainly blue-green or brown-green and is commonly found in watering-troughs. It reproduces by fragmentation forming long filaments of cells which can break into fragments called hormogonia. The hormogonia can then grow into new, longer filaments.

Synechocystis

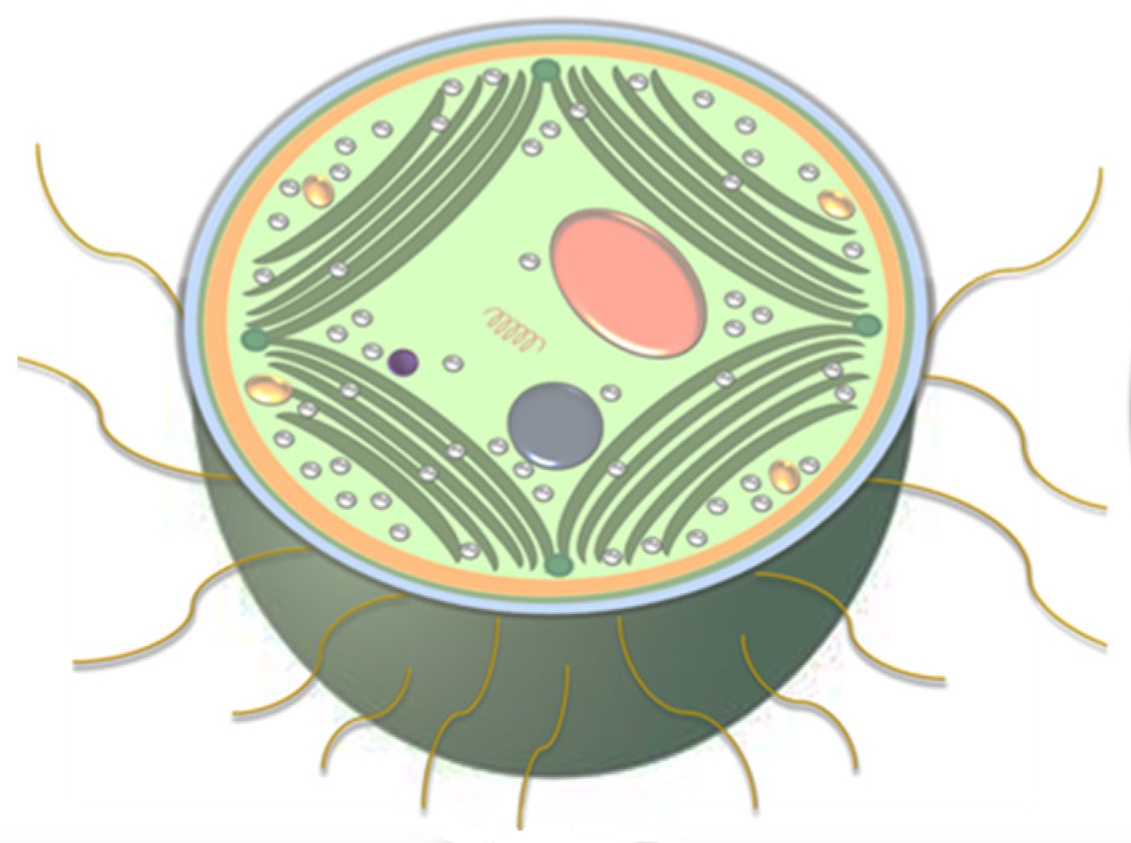
Cross section of a Synechocystis cell with pili. These cells lack flagella, but achieve motility using retractile type IV pili

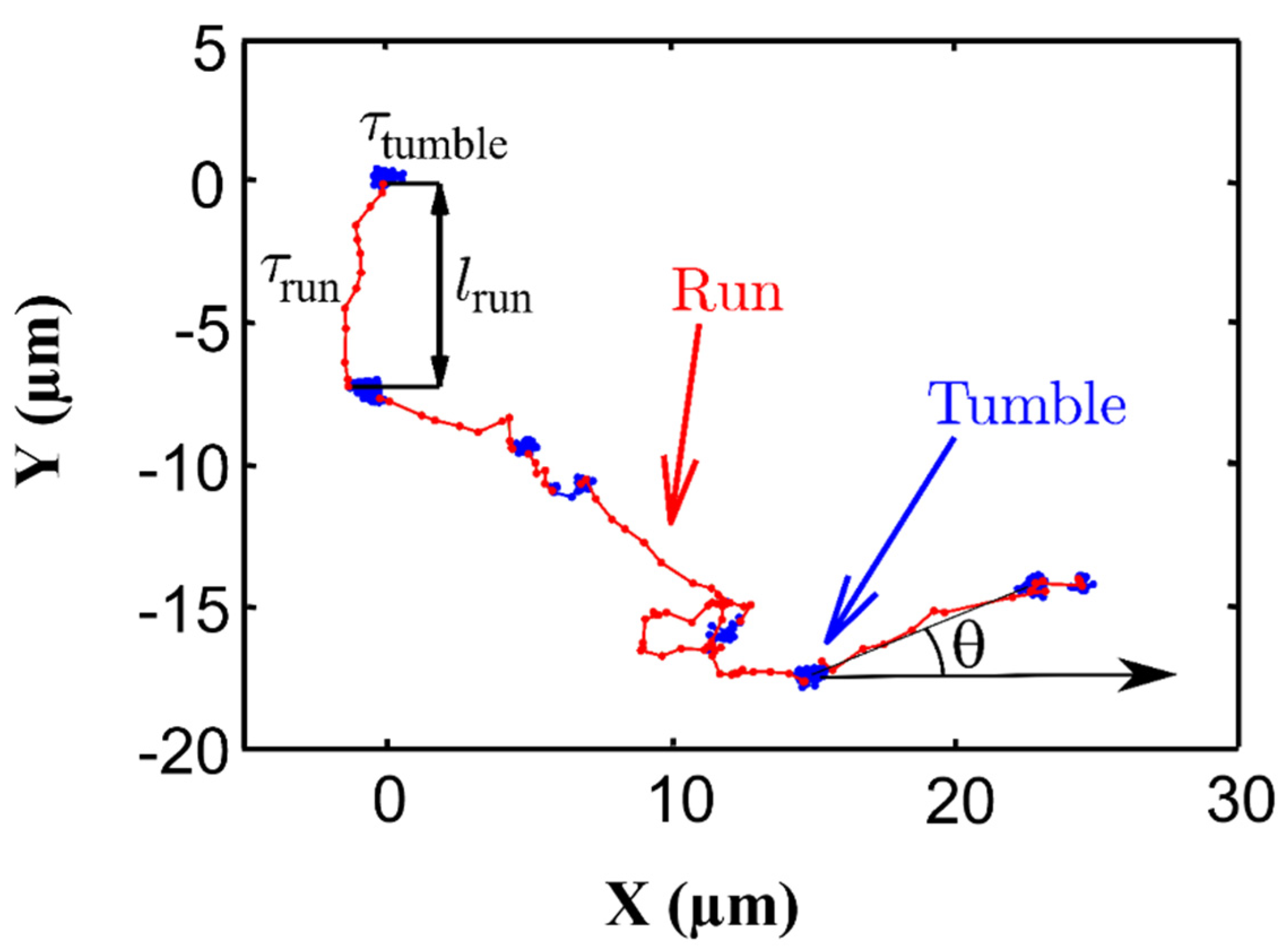
Run-and-tumble motion of a Synechocystis cyanobacterium. During run the cell moves quickly from one point to another, while during tumble it remains constrained in a given area and tends to change directions.

The well studied Synechocystis is a genus of filamentous cyanobacterium, capable of both positive and negative two-dimensional phototactic orientation on surfaces. How the steering of the filaments is achieved is not known. The slow steering of these cyanobacterial filaments is the only light-direction sensing behaviour prokaryotes could evolve owing to the difficulty in detecting light direction at this small scale. Cyanobacterium do not have flagella. Nonetheless, Synechocystis species can move in cell suspensions and on moist surfaces and by using retractile type IV pili, displaying an intermittent two phase run and tumble motion; incorporating a high-motility run and a low-motility tumble (see diagram). The two phases can be modified under various external stressors. Increasing the light intensity, uniformly over the space, increases the probability of Synechocystis being in the run state randomly in all directions. This feature, however, vanishes after a typical characteristic time of about one hour, when the initial probability is recovered. These results were well described by a mathematical model based on a linear response theory proposed by Vourc'h et al.

Synechocystis cells can also undergo biased motility under directional illumination. Under directional light flux, Synehcocystis cells perform phototactic motility and head toward the light source (in positive phototaxis). Vourc'h et al. (2020) showed that this biased motility stems from the averaged displacements during run periods, which is no longer random (as it was in the uniform illumination). They showed the bias is the result of the number of runs, which is greater toward the light source, and not of longer runs in this direction. Brought together, these results suggest distinct pathways for the recognition of light intensity and light direction in this prokaryotic microorganism. This effect can be used in the active control of bacterial flows.

It has also been observed that very strong local illumination inactivates the motility apparatus. Increasing the light intensity of more than ~475 μmol m^{−2} s^{−1} reverses the direction of Synechocystis cells to move away from the high levels of radiation source. Moreover, Synechocystis cells show a negative phototaxis behavior under ultraviolet radiation as an effective escape mechanism to avoid damage to DNA and other cellular components of Synechocystis. Contrary to the run phase that can extend from a fraction of a second to several minutes, the tumble lasts only a fraction of a second. The tumbling phase is a clockwise rotation that allows the cell to change the motility direction of the next run.

== Other examples ==
=== Synechococcus ===
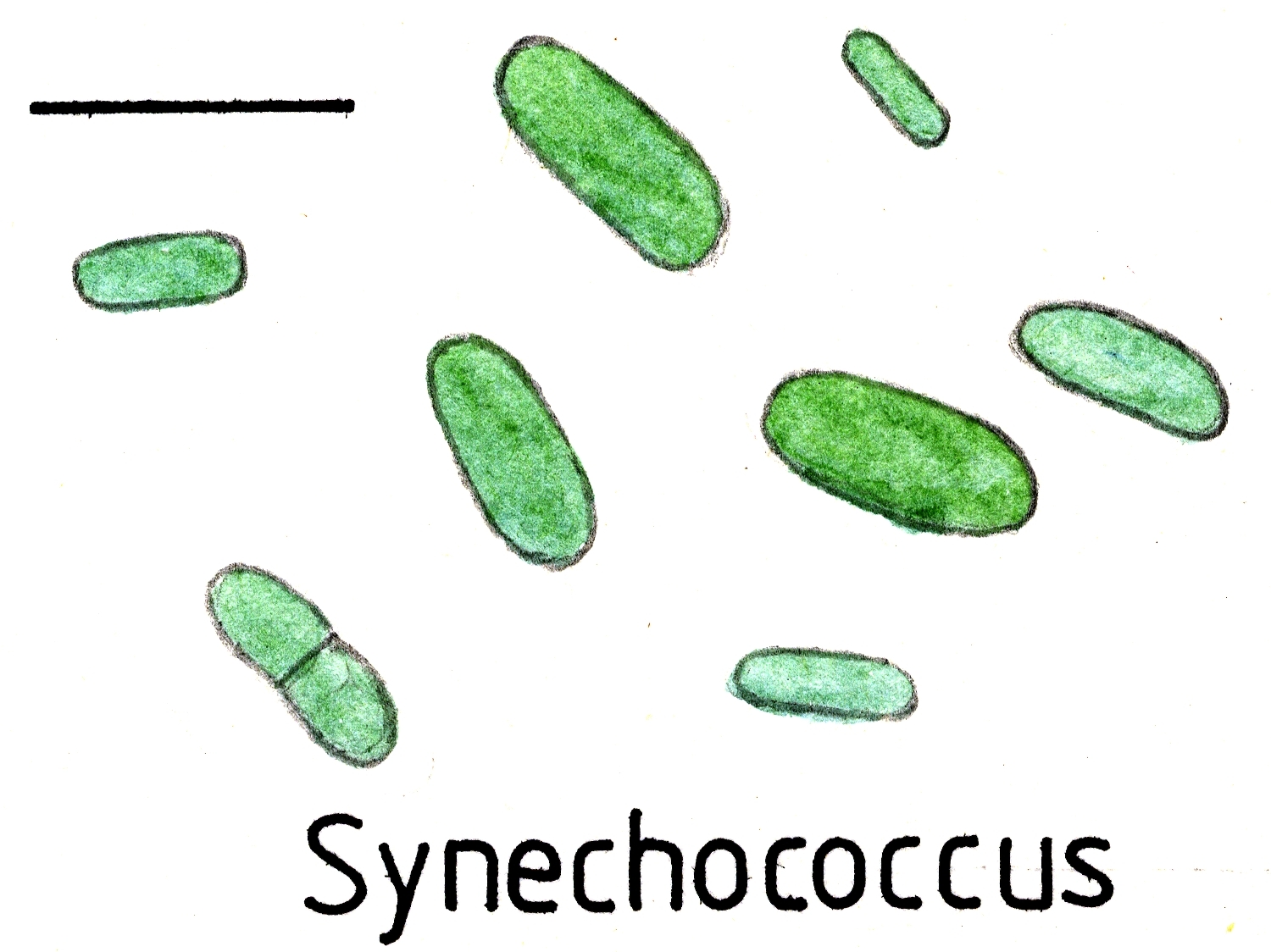
Synechococcus uses a gliding technique to move at 25 μm/s. Scale bar is about 10 μm.

Another example is Synechococcus, a marine cyanobacteria, known to swim at a speed of 25 μm/s by a mechanism different to that of bacterial flagella. Formation of waves on the cyanobacteria surface is thought to push surrounding water backwards. These cells achieve motility by a gliding method and a novel uncharacterized, non-phototactic swimming method that does not involve flagellar motion.
