= Saccharomycomorpha =

Scientific classification
- Domain: Eukaryota
- Supergroup: Rhizaria
- Phylum: Cercozoa
- Subphylum: Filosa
- Order: Glissomonadida
- Family: Saccharomycomorphidae; Feng et al. 2021
- Genus: Saccharomycomorpha; Feng et al. 2021
- Species: S. psychra

Binomial name
- Saccharomycomorpha psychra Feng et al. 2021

Type strain
- CPCC 300049

Synonyms
- Saccharomycomorphidae: Clade T

Genus of yeast-like protists

Saccharomycomorpha is a genus of non-flagellated protists with a rare yeast-like appearance, containing the single species Saccharomycomorpha psychra. It is the only genus of the family Saccharomycomorphidae (=Clade T), within the cercozoan order Glissomonadida.

== Morphology and behavior ==
Saccharomycomorpha psychra is a unicellular protist composed of round unflagellated cells, which is a unique morphological characteristic among Glissomonadida. It is able to withstand temperatures of 4 °C and its optimal growth is mainly 20 °C, making it a psychrophilic organism.

== Ecology ==
The species was isolated from lichen and moss found in both the Arctic (Svalbard) and maritime Antarctica (King George Island), respectively. These areas have a flora mainly consisting of lichens and mosses. Although glissomonads are mainly bacterivorous, Saccharomycomorpha is perhaps an osmotrophic or parasitic species, since it is able to grow in a culture medium without the presence of bacteria.
