= Adventurous motility =

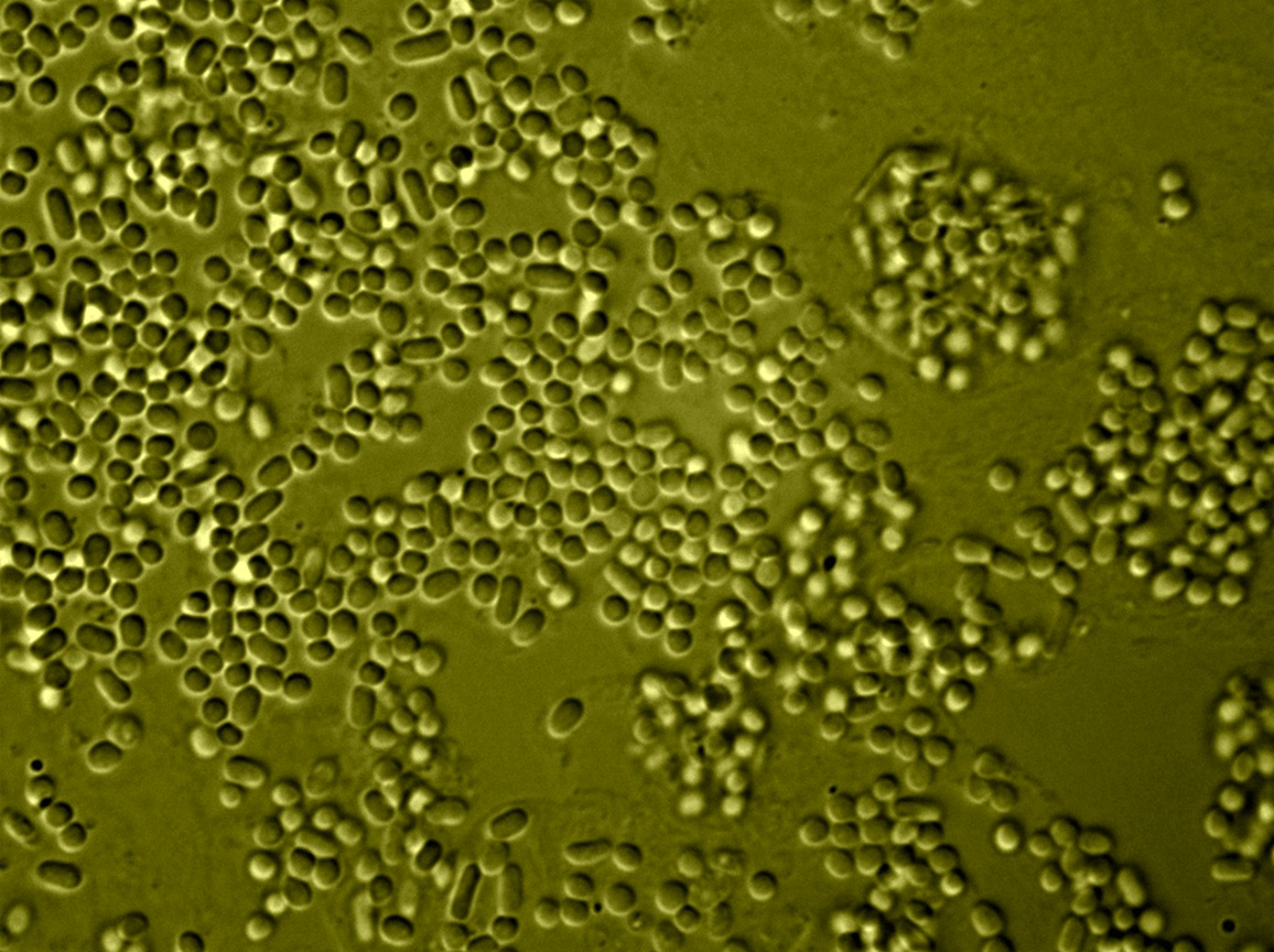
Myxococcus xanthus visualized under a microscope.

Adventurous motility is as a type of gliding motility; unlike most motility mechanisms, adventurous motility does not involve a flagellum. Gliding motility usually involves swarms of bacteria; however, adventurous motility is practiced by individual cells. This gliding is hypothesized to occur via assembly of a type IV secretion system and the extrusion of a polysaccharide slime, or by use of a series of adhesion complexes. The majority of research on adventurous motility has focused on the species, Myxococcus xanthus. The earliest of this research is attributed to Jonathan Hodgkin and Dale Kaiser.

== Competing hypotheses ==
There are currently two leading hypotheses explaining how adventurous motility occurs: (1) polar expulsion of slime or (2) a currently unknown motor that makes use of cell surface adhesion proteins. These methods of movement may coordinate with one another. The adhesion proteins may allow the cell to move across the substrate, while the slime propulsion system aids in lubrication.

1. Myxococcus has been observed leaving a slime trail on agar. This is thought to contribute to the gliding motility of these cells. As slime is expelled out of one of the poles, the bacterium is propelled forward. An experiment was performed by Rosa Yu and Dale Kaiser to support this claim. A transposon insertion mutation was added to bacteria which were capable of adventurous motility. In fifteen of the thirty-three bacteria, the cells started to expel slime from both poles simultaneously. These bacteria were unable to move forwards or backwards. The remaining bacteria were still able to move via a polar slime propulsion system; however, the efficacy of the movement was decreased. This supports the hypothesis that these cells experience adventurous motility through the use of slime expulsion. Nozzle-like organelles responsible for this propulsion have been identified in Phormidium species of cyanobacteria. It is thought that these nozzle-like organelles may be present in Myxococcus species. Mathematical models have shown that these nozzles can generate enough force to move bacterial species in the same manner that they are observed moving.
2. Myxococcus has also been observed moving via the use of surface adhesion complexes. These complexes stay in a fixed position relative to the substrate as the cell moves. The adhesion proteins are assembled at the leading pole of the cell, and disassembled at the trailing end of the cell. The entirety of the cell then travels along this mechanism of adhesion/disassembly. These complexes were found through the fluorescence and observation of the AglZ-YFP protein. As the cell moved forward, this protein was found to be associated with the substrate at a fixed position. It has been proposed that this is the result of a currently uncharacterized protein motor. This motor would attach to these "focal adhesion complexes," and move the cell forward through its gliding motility. This finding is in direct contradiction of hypothesis (1); these adhesion proteins exist along the length of the cell, while the expulsion of slime and its associated nozzle-like organelle exists at the poles of the cell.

== Frz and AglZ interactions ==
Both motility systems' reversals (S and A) are controlled by the Frz chemosensory pathway. An N-terminal pseudo-receiver domain and a lengthy C-terminal coiled-coil domain are both present in the cytoplasmic protein known as AglZ which interacts with FrzCD, the receptor for the Frz pathway. This interaction is likely to occur through their N-terminal regions. Studies of in vitro protein cross-linking was done to determine this finding. The presence of focal adhesion complexes driving cell movement during adventurous motility is suggested by the localization of AglZ in clusters that stay stable with respect to the substrate as cells advance. Mutant findings demonstrated that AglZ is a regulator of the A-motility system rather than a part of the engine driving A-motility. "As cells reverse, they both switch polarity in a coordinated manner." AglZ and FrzS have been postulated to be positioned downstream of the Frz pathway in the control of A- and S-motility, respectively. Genetic studies overwhelmingly support the notion that AglZ is upstream of the Frz pathway.

== Myxococcus xanthus ==
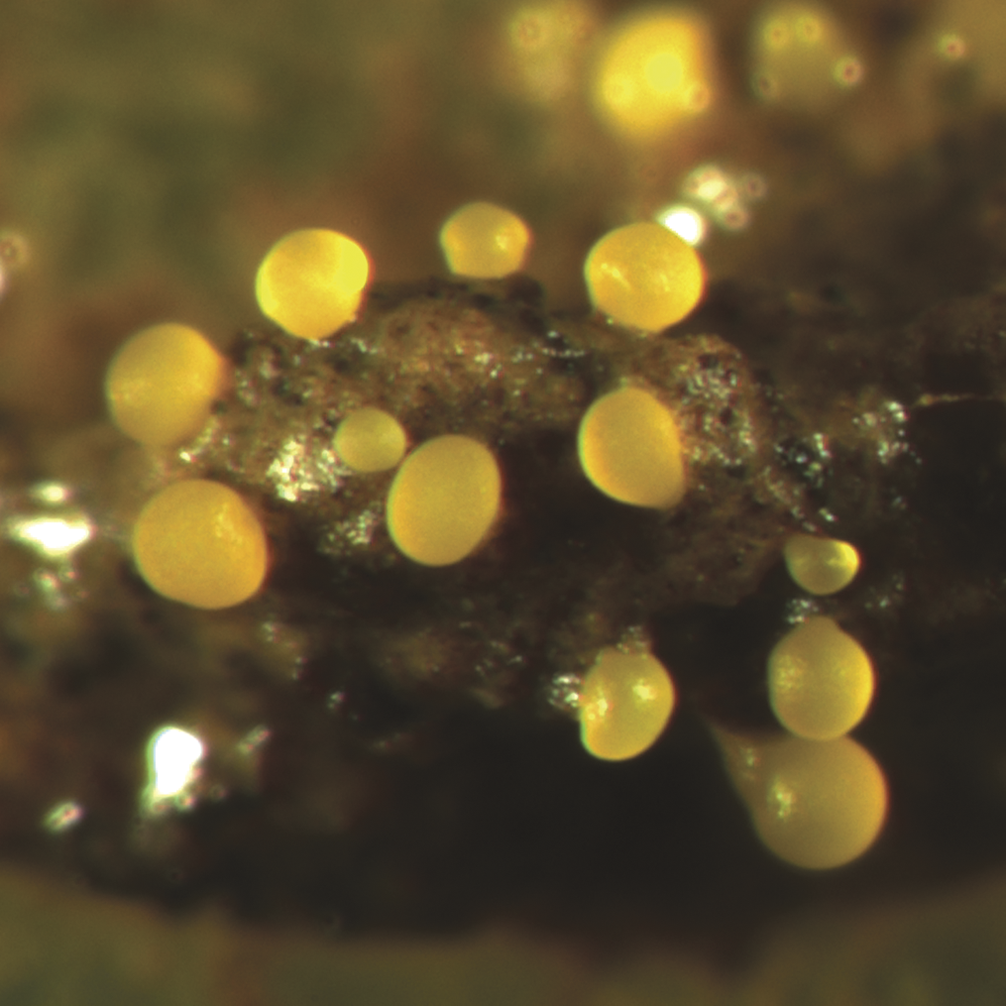
M. xanthus fruiting bodies are macroscopic and visible to the naked eye.

M. xanthus is a member of the Proteobacteria phylum, and is classified therein as a Deltaproteobacteria. The name Myxococcus xanthus can be interpreted as "yellow slime coccus". When examined under the microscope it appears as a Gram-negative rod, and is noted for its ability to form spores and fruiting bodies. M. xanthus is the primary example, and most researched microbe that takes part in adventurous motility. Commonly found in the soil, M. xanthus is capable of moving across solid surfaces without the use of flagella. This is achieved through two different methods of motility - social motility and adventurous motility. M. xanthus preys on other bacterial cells, and uses social motility and adventurous motility to hunt in packs or individually respectively.

== Structural makeup ==
Studies have shown that adventurous motility is made up of 21 genetic loci and two different structures. The two structures we have identified is a secretion organelle and a linear periodic chain like structure. Adventurous motility is not fully understood but it is proposed that Agl/Glt proteins form a large envelope that then interacts with MreB filaments. This interaction then allows it to move across the cytoplasmic membrane. The slime component of adventurous motility has been thought to assist in lubrication, adhesion, propulsion, and also decrease friction.

== History ==
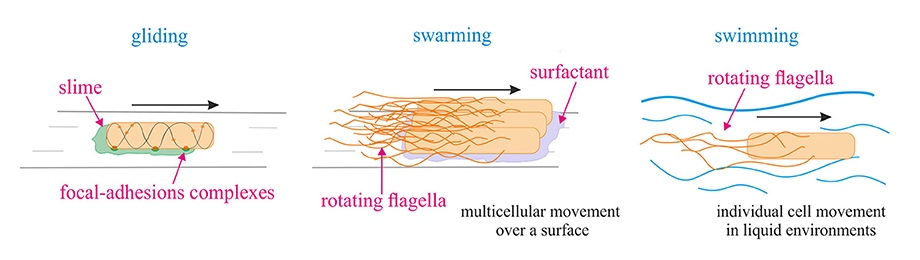
This image depicts a variety of types of bacterial locomotion

Since microorganisms began inhabiting the Earth 3.7 billion years ago, differing forms of motility have developed over time. Motility allows bacteria to move toward food and more favorable environments, or away from toxins. A deeper investigation into gliding motility began in the 1970's at the hands of Hodgkin and Kaiser. Through genetic analysis, they were able to find two distinct subsets of genes that contribute to the motility of Myxococcus xanthus. These genes result in a sort of "social motility" which allows the microbes to hunt in packs. Adventurous motility can also be described as an individual cell exploring a territory. This exploring movement is possible through a mix of slime secretion, motor proteins, and focal adhesion complexes. Social motility and adventurous motility are both considered mutations and are the topic of many studies as they are not well understood. Myxococcus xanthus has been the most researched bacterium in regards to adventurous motility.
