= Viridiraptor =

Scientific classification
- Domain: Eukaryota
- Clade: Sar
- Clade: Rhizaria
- Phylum: Cercozoa
- Subphylum: Filosa
- Family: Viridiraptoridae
- Genus: Viridiraptor; Hess and Melkonian 2013
- Species: V. invadens

Binomial name
- Viridiraptor invadens Hess and Melkonian 2013

Genus of predatorial protists

Viridiraptor is a genus of heterotrophic protists, containing the single species Viridiraptor invadens. It belongs to the family Viridiraptoridae, in the phylum Cercozoa.

== Morphology ==
Viridiraptor are unicellular biflagellated organisms that have two blunt-ended, slightly unequal flagella and a peripheral conical nucleus closer to the cell's apical end, closely surrounded by several Golgi dictyosomes in its most anterior (anatomy) half. There are cortical extrusomes distributed homogenously across the cell periphery.

== Ecology and behavior ==
Starving Viridiraptor cells can glide agitatedly while whipping their anterior flagellum, but they also commonly swim across the water column along a helical path. They invade dead or live cells of large-celled freshwater green algae to feed on their protoplast material, and also propagate within the lumen of the devoured cell. They can also extract plastids from small-celled algae.

== Etymology ==
The name Viridiraptor (from Latin viride 'green' and raptor 'thief'), meaning 'robber of the green', refers to its ability to feed on the chloroplasts of the green algae that it preys. The epithet invadens (from Latin invado 'invading') is due to its ability to invade live algal cells.
