= Twitching motility =

Form of crawling bacterial motility

Twitching motility is a form of crawling bacterial motility used to move over surfaces. Twitching is mediated by the activity of hair-like filaments called type IV pili which extend from the cell's exterior, bind to surrounding solid substrates, and retract, pulling the cell forwards in a manner similar to the action of a grappling hook. The name twitching motility is derived from the characteristic jerky and irregular motions of individual cells when viewed under the microscope. It has been observed in many bacterial species, but is most well studied in Pseudomonas aeruginosa, Neisseria gonorrhoeae and Myxococcus xanthus. Active movement mediated by the twitching system has been shown to be an important component of the pathogenic mechanisms of several species.

== Mechanisms ==
=== Pilus structure ===
Twitching motility. Type IV pili are extended from the surface of twitching-capable cells and attach to a nearby surface. Pilus retraction results in the forwards movement of the cell. Arrows indicate direction of pilus retraction/extension. Inset: Structure of the type IV pilus machinery. The four composing subcomplexes (the motor subcomplex (red), alignment subcomplex (blue and violet), secretion subcomplex (yellow) and pilus (green)) are highlighted.

The type IV pilus complex consists of both the pilus itself and the machinery required for its construction and motor activity. The pilus filament is largely composed of the PilA protein, with more uncommon minor pilins at the tip. These are thought to play a role in initiation of pilus construction. Under normal conditions, the pilin subunits are arranged as a helix with five subunits in each turn, but pili under tension are able to stretch and rearrange their subunits into a second configuration with around 1 2/3 subunits per turn.

Three subcomplexes form the apparatus responsible for assembling and retracting the type IV pili. The core of this machinery is the motor subcomplex, consisting of the PilC protein and the cytosolic ATPases PilB and PilT. These ATPases drive pilus extension or retraction respectively, depending on which of the two is currently bound to the pilus complex. Surrounding the motor complex is the alignment subcomplex, formed from the PilM, PilN, PilO and PilP proteins. These proteins form a bridge between the inner and outer membranes and create a link between the inner membrane motor subcomplex and the outer membrane secretion subcomplex. This consists of a pore formed from the PilQ protein, through which the assembled pilus can exit the cell.

=== Regulation ===
Regulatory proteins associated with the twitching motility system have strong sequence and structural similarity to those that regulate bacterial chemotaxis using flagellae. In P. aeruginosa for example, a total of four homologous chemosensory pathways are present, three regulating swimming motility and one regulating twitching motility. These chemotactic systems allow cells to regulate twitching so as to move towards chemoattractants such as phospholipids and fatty acids. In contrast to the run-and-tumble model of chemotaxis associated with flagellated cells however, movement towards chemoattractants in twitching cells appears to be mediated via regulation of the timing of directional reversals.

=== Motility patterns ===
The tug-of-war model of twitching motility. Cells (such as the shown N. gonorrhoeae diplococcus) extend pili (green) that attach themselves to locations in the surrounding environment (blue circles). Pili experience tension due to activation of the retraction machinery. Upon detachment or rupture of a pilus (red), the cell quickly jerks into a new position based on the resulting balance of forces acting through the remaining pili.

Twitching motility is capable of driving the movement of individual cells. The pattern of motility that results is highly dependent upon cell shape and the distribution of pili over the cell surface. In N. gonorrhoeae for example, the roughly spherical cell shape and uniform distribution of pili results in cells adopting a 2D random walk over the surface they are attached to. In contrast, species such as P. aeruginosa and M. xanthus exist as elongated rods with pili localised at their poles, and show much greater directional persistence during crawling due to the resulting bias in force generation direction. P. aeruginosa and M. xanthus are also able to reverse direction during crawling by switching the pole of pilus localization. Type IV pili also mediate a form of walking motility in P. aeruginosa, where pili are used to pull the cell rod into a vertical orientation and move it at much higher speeds than during horizontal crawling motility.

The existence of many pili pulling simultaneously on the cell body results in a balance of forces determining the movement of the cell body. This is known as the tug-of-war model of twitching motility. Sudden changes in the balance of forces caused by detachment or release of individual pili results in a fast jerk (or 'slingshot') that combines fast rotational and lateral movements, in contrast to the slower lateral movements seen during the longer periods between slingshots.

== Roles ==
=== Pathogenesis ===
Both presence of type IV pili and active pilar movement appear to be important contributors to the pathogenicity of several species. In P. aeruginosa, loss of pilus retraction results in a reduction of bacterial virulence in pneumonia and reduces colonisation of the cornea. Some bacteria are also able to twitch along vessel walls against the direction of fluid flow within them, which is thought to permit colonisation of otherwise inaccessible sites in the vasculatures of plants and animals.

Bacterial cells can also be targeted by twitching: during the cell invasion phase of the lifecycle of Bdellovibrio, type IV pili are used by cells to pull themselves through gaps formed in the cell wall of prey bacteria. Once inside, the Bdellovibrio are able to use the host cell's resources to grow and reproduce, eventually lysing the cell wall of the prey bacterium and escaping to invade other cells.

=== Biofilms ===
Twitching motility is also important during the formation of biofilms. During biofilm establishment and growth, motile bacteria are able to interact with secreted extracellular polymeric substances (EPSs) such as Psl, alginate and extracellular DNA. As they encounter sites of high EPS deposition, P. aeruginosa cells slow down, accumulate and deposit further EPS components. This positive feedback is an important initiating factor for the establishment of microcolonies, the precursors to fully fledged biofilms. In addition, once biofilms have become established, their twitching-mediated spread is facilitated and organised by components of the EPS.

Twitching can also influence the structure of biofilms. During their establishment, twitching-capable cells are able to crawl on top of cells lacking twitching motility and dominate the fast-growing external surface of the biofilm.

== Taxonomic distribution and evolution ==
Type IV pili and related structures can be found across almost all phyla of Bacteria and Archaea, however definitive twitching motility has been shown in a more limited range of prokaryotes. Most well studied and wide spread are the twitching Pseudomonadota, such as Neisseria gonorrhoeae, Myxococcus xanthus and Pseudomonas aeruginosa. Nevertheless, twitching has been observed in other phyla as well. For example, twitching motility has been observed in the cyanobacterium Synechocystis, as well as the gram-positive Bacillota Streptococcus sanguinis.

Other structures and systems closely related to type IV pili have also been observed in prokaryotes. In Archea, for example, bundles of type IV-like filaments have been observed to form helical structures similar in both form and function to the bacterial flagellum. These swimming associated structures have been termed archaella. Also closely related to the type IV pilus is the type II secretion system, itself widely distributed amongst gram-negative bacteria. In this secretion system, cargo destined for export is associated with tips of type IV-like pseudopili in the periplasm. Extension of the pseudopili through secretin proteins similar to PilQ permits these cargo proteins to cross the outer membrane and enter the extracellular environment.

Because of this wide but patchy distribution of type IV pilus-like machinery, it has been suggested that the genetic material encoding it has been transferred between species via horizontal gene transfer following its initial development in a single species of Pseudomonadota.

== See also ==
- Gliding motility
- Pilus
- Swarming motility
