= Gliding motility =

Method of mobility used by microorganisms

Various types of motility systems roughly assigned to the relative positions in the Tree of Life.: 1. (1a) bacterial flagellar swimming, (1b) spirochetes flagellar swimming, (1c) magnetotactic bacterial flagellar swimming, (1d) bacterial flagellar swarming, (1e) Leptospira crawling motility; 2. bacterial pili motility; 3. Myxococcus xanthus adventurous (A) motility; 4. Bacteroidetes gliding; 5. Chloroflexus aggregans surface motility; 6. Synechococcus nonflagellar swimming; 7. archaella swimming; 8. (8a) amoeba motility based on actin polymerization, (8b) actin-based comet tail bacterial motility; 9. heliozoa motility based on microtubule depolymerization; 10. myosin sliding, (10a) amoeba motility driven by contraction of cortical actin–myosin, (10b) animal muscle contraction; 11. kinesin sliding; 12. dynein sliding, (11a, 12a) flagellar surface motility (FSM), (12b) flagellar swimming; 13. haptonemal contraction; 14. spasmoneme contraction; 15. amoeboid motility of nematode sperm; 16. Mycoplasma mobile gliding; 17. Mycoplasma pneumoniae gliding; 18. Spiroplasma swimming; 19. (i) bacterial sliding; 20. (ii) gas vesicle; 21. (iii) dandelion seed

Gliding motility is a type of translocation used by microorganisms that is independent of cell-surface appendages such as flagella, pili, and fimbriae. Gliding allows microorganisms to travel along the surface of thin aqueous films. The mechanisms of this motility are only partially known.

Bacterial gliding allows motility along a thinly aqueous surface. The other very different type of bacterial motility is called twitching motility that also allows movement along a thinly aqueous surface, but this type of movement is jerky and uses type IV pili as its means of transport.

The speed of gliding varies between organisms, and the reversal of direction is seemingly regulated by some sort of internal clock. For example the apicomplexans are able to travel at fast rates between 1–10 μm/s. In contrast Myxococcus xanthus bacteria glide at a rate of 0.08 μm/s.

== Bacterial gliding ==
Bacterial gliding is a process of motility whereby a bacterium can move under its own power. Generally, the process occurs whereby the bacterium moves along a surface in the general direction of its long axis. Gliding may occur via distinctly different mechanisms, depending on the type of bacterium. This type of movement has been observed in phylogenetically diverse bacteria such as cyanobacteria, myxobacteria, cytophaga, flavobacteria, and mycoplasma. The first report of gliding motility in the Desulfobulbaceae family has been shown in cable bacteria.

Myxococcus xanthus cells exhibit a coordinated swarming behavior which may be observed macroscopically as a rhythmic rippling. Upon encountering cellular debris or other macromolecules, aligned M. xanthus cells will form converging or diverging "accordion waves". As converging waves meet, cell reversals occur and the waves reflect away from each other.

Bacteria move in response to varying climates, water content, presence of other organisms, and firmness of surfaces or media. Gliding has been observed in a wide variety of phyla, and though the mechanisms may vary between bacteria, it is currently understood that it takes place in environments with common characteristics, such as firmness and low-water, which enables the bacterium to still have motility in its surroundings. Such environments with low-water content include biofilms, soil or soil crumbs in tilth, and microbial mats.

=== Mechanisms ===
Bacterial gliding may be achieved by:

a) Type IV pili: A cell attaches its type IV pili to a surface or object in the direction it is traveling. The proteins in the pili are then broken down to shrink the pili pulling the cell closer to the surface or object that it was attached to.

b) Specific motility membrane proteins: Transmembrane proteins are attached to the host surface. This adhesion complex can either be specific to a certain type of surface like a certain cell type or generic for any solid surface. Motor proteins attached to an inner membrane force the movement of the internal cell structures in relation to the transmembrane proteins creating net movement. This is driven by the proton motive force. The proteins involved differ between species. An example of a bacterium that uses this mechanism would be Flavobacterium. This mechanism is still being studied and is not well understood.

c) Polysaccharide jet: The cell releases a 'jet' of polysaccharide material behind it propelling it forward. This polysaccharide material is left behind. Cell-invasion and gliding motility have TRAP (thrombospondin-related anonymous protein), a surface protein, as a common molecular basis that is both essential for infection and locomotion of the invasive apicomplexan parasite. Micronemes are secretory organelles on the apical surface of the apicomplexans used for gliding motility.

=== Other proposed mechanisms ===
The mechanism of gliding might differ between species. Examples of such mechanisms include:

- Motor proteins found within the inner membrane of the bacteria utilize a proton-conducting channel to transduce a mechanical force to the cell surface. The movement of the cytoskeletal microfilaments causes a mechanical force which travels to the adhesion complexes on the substrate to move the cell forward. Motor and regulatory proteins that convert intracellular motion into mechanical forces like traction force have been discovered to be a conserved class of intracellular motors in bacteria that have been adapted to produce cell motility.
- A-motility (adventurous motility) as a proposed type of gliding motility, involving transient adhesion complexes fixed to the substrate while the organism moves forward. For example, in Myxococcus xanthus, a social bacterium.
- Ejection or secretion of a polysaccharide slime from nozzles at either end of the cell body.
- Energized nano-machinery or large macromolecular assemblies located on the bacterium's cell body.
- "Focal adhesion complexes" and "treadmilling" of surface adhesins distributed along the cell body.
- The gliding motility of Flavobacterium johnsoniae uses a helical track superficially similar to M. xanthus, but via a different mechanism. Here the adhesin SprB is propelled along the cell surface (spiraling from pole to pole), pulling the bacterium along 25 times faster than M. xanthus. Flavobacterium johnsoniae move via a screw-like mechanism and are powered by a proton motive force.

Swarming motility occurs on softer semi-solid and solid surfaces (which usually involves movement of a bacterial population in a coordinated fashion via quorum sensing, using flagella to propel them), or twitching motility on solid surfaces (which involves extension and retraction of type IV pili to drag the bacterium forward).

==== Purpose ====
Gliding, as a form of motility, appears to allow for interactions between bacteria, pathogenesis, and increased social behaviours. It may play an important role in biofilm formation, bacterial virulence, and chemosensing.

== See also ==
- Extracellular polymeric substance
- Microneme
- Mucilage
