= Haliangium tepidum =

Scientific classification
- Domain: Bacteria
- Kingdom: Pseudomonadati
- Phylum: Myxococcota
- Class: Myxococcia
- Order: Myxococcales
- Family: Kofleriaceae
- Genus: Haliangium
- Species: H. tepidum

Binomial name
- Haliangium tepidum Fudou et al. 2002

Species of bacterium

Haliangium tepidum is a species of moderately halophilic myxobacteria. It produces yellow fruiting bodies, comprising several sessile sporangioles in dense packs. Its type strain is SMP-10 (= JCM 11304(T)= DSM 14436(T)).
