= Myxococcus llanfairpwllgwyngyllgogerychwyrndrobwllllantysiliogogogochensis =

- Scanning electron micrographs of typical myxobacterial cells. (A) strain AM401 (Myxococcus llanfairpwllgwyngyllgogerychwyrndrobwllllantysiliogogogochensis)

Scientific classification
- Domain: Bacteria
- Kingdom: Pseudomonadati
- Phylum: Myxococcota
- Class: Myxococcia
- Order: Myxococcales
- Family: Myxococcaceae
- Genus: Myxococcus
- Species: M. llanfairpwllgwyngyllgogerychwyrndrobwllllantysiliogogogochensis

Binomial name
- Myxococcus llanfairpwllgwyngyllgogerychwyrndrobwllllantysiliogogogochensis Chambers et al., 2020

Type strain
- AM401^{T}

Species of bacteria

Myxococcus llanfairpwllgwyngyllgogerychwyrndrobwllllantysiliogogogochensis is a gram-negative, rod-shaped species within the order Myxococcales (commonly known as myxobacteria). The microorganism can be found in the soils of the village of Llanfairpwllgwyngyll on the island of Anglesey in North Wales. Its specific name was given after the settlement's 58-character lengthened name (Llanfairpwllgwyngyllgogerychwyrndrobwllllantysiliogogogoch), which is the longest in Europe. Members of the Myxococcus genus are predatory bacteria that contain the ability to secrete antimicrobial compounds, becoming an important source for novel antimicrobials. The species has been criticized by some for not following recommendations in the International Code of Nomenclature of Prokaryotes, but the name was later confirmed as valid in 2021.

== Scientific classification ==
This organism is a member of the genus Myxococcus and its taxonomic classification is as follows: Bacteria, Pseudomonadota, Deltaproteobacteria, Myxococcales, Myxococcaceae, Myxococcus, Myxococcus llanfairpwllgwyngyllgogerychwyrndrobwllllantysiliogogogochensis. There are currently 5 known genera in the family Myxococcaceae and 8 known species within the genus Myxococcus.

=== Relatives ===
Phylogenetic analysis using 16S rRNA gene sequences, average nucleotide identity (ANI), and digital DNA-DNA hybridization (dDDH) values demonstrates that Myxococcus llanfairpwllgwyngyllgogerychwyrndrobwllllantysiliogogogochensis groups with other Myxococcus species rather than forming a distinct lineage. The organism's closest relative based on 16S rRNA gene sequence analysis is M. macrosporus strain DSM 14697T, with ANI and dDDH values confirming clear species-level distinction (ANI < 95% and dDDH < 70%). 16S rRNA gene sequencing is a technique that uses conserved ribosomal RNA gene sequences to establish evolutionary relationships and identify bacterial taxa. Average Nucleotide Identity is a genomic technique that measures nucleotide similarity between bacterial strains for genetic-based species classification. Digital DNA-DNA hybridization is a computational technique that measures genome similarity between bacterial strains to define species boundaries without laboratory experiments. M. llanfairpwllgwyngyllgogerychwyrndrobwllllantysiliogogogochensis possesses a draft genome, which is the complete set of genetic instructions encoded in its DNA, of 12.41 megabases (Mb), meaning its DNA sequence spans approximately 12.41 million base pairs. Its GC content is 68.7%, referring to the proportion of the genome composed of guanine (G) and cytosine (C) nucleotides, two of the nitrogen bases that pair together in the DNA double helix. A high GC content like this is associated with greater thermal stability of the DNA strand and is a defining biochemical signature of the genus Myxococcus. The genome size and composition are consistent with other members of the Myxococcus/Pyxidicoccus genus complex, which typically exhibit larger and more variable genome sizes compared to Corallococcus species. Other close relatives of M. llanfairpwllgwyngyllgogerychwyrndrobwllllantysiliogogogochensis within the genus include M. fulvus, M. stipitatus, M. virescens/xanthus, and the newly described species M. eversor and M. vastator, all of which share ANI values of 82-91%, indicating distinct but related species within the Myxococcus clade.

== Discovery ==
=== Etymology ===
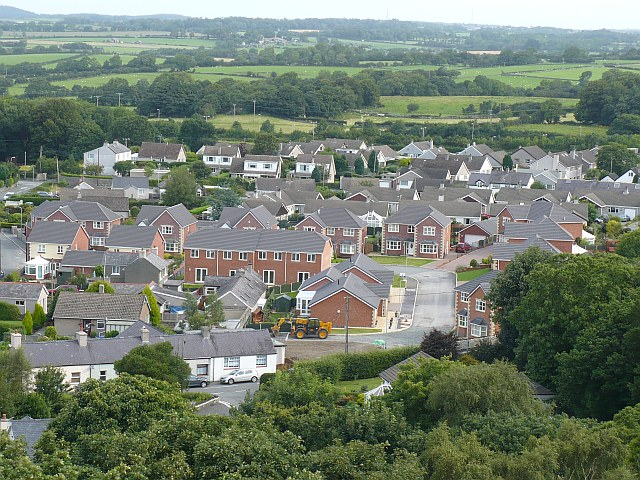
Village of Llanfairpwllgwyngyllgogerychwyrndrobwllllantysiliogogogoch, Wales

Myxococcus llanfairpwllgwyngyllgogerychwyrndrobwllllantysiliogogogochensis is named after Llanfairpwllgwyngyllgogerychwyrndrobwllllantysiliogogogoch, Wales, which is the location where the organism was isolated. The bacterium was discovered in 2020 by a group of scientists led by James Chambers from Aberystwyth University in Wales. The researchers were aiming to find novel species of myxobacteria, a bacterial group characterized as being a predator of other bacteria and thus an important potential source of antimicrobials such as antibiotics and antiviral as well as being found in soil.

=== Sources ===
The strain of M. llanfairpwllgwyngyllgogerychwyrndrobwllllantysiliogogogochensis was isolated from soil samples collected from the town of Llanfairpwllgwyngyllgogerychwyrndrobwllllantysiliogogogoch on the island of Anglesey in Northern Wales. The researchers traveled to this location on 6 October 2020, specifically targeting soil environments known to harbor myxobacteria. Bacterial samples were isolated from the soil using an experimental method involving a specific strain of Escherichia coli as bait to attract these predatory bacteria. Once isolated, the bacteria were analyzed using 16S rRNA gene sequencing and compared with the species database EzBioCloud to determine whether they had discovered a new species of myxobacteria. Certified reference strains of the same genus, Myxococcus, were obtained from a German culture collection (DSMZ) to determine the closest known genetic relatives of this newly discovered species.

=== Media ===
Myxococcus llanfairpwllgwyngyllgogerychwyrndrobwllllantysiliogogogochensis was cultured on VY-2 medium, a nutrient-rich agar containing 0.5% dried baker's yeast, 0.1% CaCl₂⋅2H₂O, and 1.5% agar by weight to volume.

== Morphology and physiology ==
Vegetative cells of M. llanfairpwllgwyngyllgogerychwyrndrobwllllantysiliogogogochensis are Gram-negative and rod-shaped, with ends that taper slightly. These cells have been measured using electron micrographs to have a width of 0.4–0.6 µm and a length of 4.0–7.0 µm. Colonies have been observed to be pale brown and exhibit swarming motility when grown on VY-2 agar. Meanwhile, the fruiting bodies are roughly spherical in shape and orange in color.

== Metabolism ==
Myxococcus llanfairpwllgwyngyllgogerychwyrndrobwllllantysiliogogogochensis cannot reduce nitrate, produce indole, or acidify glucose. It also lacks the enzyme arginine dihydrolase, limiting its ability to process certain amino acids. However, this organism produces several important enzymes including those that hydrolyze esculin, gelatin, and urea, allowing it to break down these organic compounds for nutritional purposes. M. llanfairpwllgwyngyllgogerychwyrndrobwllllantysiliogogogochensis is a chemoorganotroph and uses aerobic respiration as its primary metabolic pathway. It is capable of assimilating various carbon sources including arabinose, glucose, malate, maltose, mannitol, and phenyl acetate for energy and biosynthesis. However, it cannot utilize gluconate, caprate, or citrate as carbon sources, indicating specific metabolic limitations. As a predatory bacterium, M. llanfairpwllgwyngyllgogerychwyrndrobwllllantysiliogogogochensis primarily obtains nutrients through heterotrophic feeding on other microorganisms, secreting antimicrobial compounds to kill and digest prey bacteria. This predatory lifestyle allows it to access complex organic molecules from lysed prey cells, which it then processes through its available enzymatic pathways to support growth and reproduction.

== Ecology ==
Myxococcus llanfairpwllgwyngyllgogerychwyrndrobwllllantysiliogogogochensis is known to be a mesophile, where optimum growth temperature is approximately 30-35°C with aerobic conditions required for cultivation. It thrives in a wide pH range from 5.0-9.0, demonstrating neutralophilic to slightly alkaliphilic preferences. NaCl concentrations between 1-4% have been tolerated in previous studies, indicating halotolerance. The bacterium exhibits predatory behavior, able to prey upon various bacterial and fungal species including E. coli TOP10, Clavibacter nebraskensis DSM 7483, and Ustilago maydis DSM 14603, albeit with low efficiency. This predatory capability indicates that M. llanfairpwllgwyngyllgogerychwyrndrobwllllantysiliogogogochensis can survive in diverse soil environments where it can access multiple prey organisms, making it well-adapted to the temperate oceanic climate conditions of Northern Wales where it was originally isolated.

== Genome ==
The genome for Myxococcus llanfairpwllgwyngyllgogerychwyrndrobwllllantysiliogogogochensis is not complete. The current draft genome of M. llanfairpwllgwyngyllgogerychwyrndrobwllllantysiliogogogochensis, strain AM401^{T}, contained 1,077 currently identified contigs (sets of overlapping DNA fragments) with an L50 and N50 of 102 and 35,723, roughly meaning that 50% of the genome consists of 102 of the contigs that have a length of at least 35,723 base pairs. Additionally, the draft genome has a total size of 12.41 Mb and a GC content of 68.7%.

=== Sequencing ===
Draft genome sequences of M. llanfairpwllgwyngyllgogerychwyrndrobwllllantysiliogogogochensis, strain AM401^{T}, were constructed by MicrobesNG and the Centre for Genomic Research using the Illumina HiSeq 2500 sequencing platform to sequence the genome of the strain. In addition, the sequenced DNA fragments were then processed through several algorithms, including BWA-MEM for aligning the DNA fragments based on a reference genome, Kraken 2.0 for taxonomic identification and classification of the fragments, and SPAdes 3.7 for assembling the fragments together into a more complete sequence. These assembled sequences were then deposited into GenBank. Annotation of the assembled coding sequences was done by an updated model of the Prokaryotic Genome Annotation Pipeline, PGAP-4, in order to identify potential genes and predict their functions.

== Significance ==
Myxococcus llanfairpwllgwyngyllgogerychwyrndrobwllllantysiliogogogochensis has potential applications that can benefit medicine and the pharmaceutical industry. Predatory microbes, such as M. llanfairpwllgwyngyllgogerychwyrndrobwllllantysiliogogogochensis and other myxobacteria, secrete bioactive compounds with antimicrobial properties as part of their lifestyle, with various antibiotics, antivirals, and cytotoxins having been sourced from myxobacteria species. While there are no novel bioactive compounds currently attributed to M. llanfairpwllgwyngyllgogerychwyrndrobwllllantysiliogogogochensis, it may serve of the source of new antimicrobial therapeutics in the future, helping to mitigate the effects of bacterial resistance against antimicrobials currently being used.

== See also ==
- List of long species names
