= Haliangium ochraceum =

Scientific classification
- Domain: Bacteria
- Kingdom: Pseudomonadati
- Phylum: Myxococcota
- Class: Myxococcia
- Order: Myxococcales
- Family: Kofleriaceae
- Genus: Haliangium
- Species: H. ochraceum

Binomial name
- Haliangium ochraceum Fudou et al. 2002

Species of bacterium

Haliangium ochraceum is a species of moderately halophilic myxobacteria. It produces yellow fruiting bodies, comprising several sessile sporangioles in dense packs. Its type strain is SMP-2 (= JCM 11303(T) = DSM 14365(T)). Its genome has been sequenced.
