= Multicopy single-stranded DNA =

msDNA from Stigmatella aurantiaca compared with msDNA from the closely related Myxococcus xanthus. The hypervariable domain in the DNA sequence is shaded gray. The highly conserved AGC RNA sequence including the branch G is shaded pink. An RNA cleavage site between precursor and product forms of msDNA is indicated by a red triangle. Redrawn from Dhundale et al.

Multicopy single-stranded DNA (msDNA) is a type of extrachromosomal satellite DNA that consists of a single-stranded DNA molecule covalently linked via a 2'-5'phosphodiester bond to an internal guanosine of an RNA molecule. The resultant DNA/RNA chimera possesses two stem-loops joined by a branch similar to the branches found in RNA splicing intermediates. The coding region for msDNA, called a "retron", also encodes a type of reverse transcriptase, which is essential for msDNA synthesis.

== Discovery ==
Before the discovery of msDNA in myxobacteria, a group of swarming, soil-dwelling bacteria, it was thought that the enzymes known as reverse transcriptases (RT) existed only in eukaryotes and viruses. The discovery led to an increase in research of the area. Further research discovered similarities between HIV-encoded reverse transcriptase and an open reading frame (ORF) found in the msDNA coding region. Tests confirmed the presence of reverse transcriptase activity in crude lysates of retron-containing strains. Although an RNase H domain was tentatively identified in the retron ORF, it was later found that the RNase H activity required for msDNA synthesis is actually supplied by the host.

== Retrons ==
The discovery of msDNA has led to broader questions regarding where reverse transcriptase originated, as genes encoding for reverse transcriptase (not necessarily associated with msDNA) have been found in prokaryotes, eukaryotes, viruses and even archaea. After a DNA fragment coding for the production of msDNA in E. coli was discovered, it was conjectured that bacteriophages might have been responsible for the introduction of the RT gene into E. coli. These discoveries suggest that reverse transcriptase played a role in the evolution of viruses from bacteria, with one hypothesis stating that, with the help of reverse transcriptase, viruses may have arisen as a breakaway msDNA gene that acquired a protein coat. Since nearly all RT genes function in retrovirus replication and/or the movement of transposable elements, it is reasonable to imagine that retrons might be mobile genetic elements, but there has been little supporting evidence for such a hypothesis, save for the observed fact that msDNA is widely yet sporadically dispersed among bacterial species in a manner suggestive of both horizontal and vertical transfer. Since it is not known whether retron sequences per se represent mobile elements, retrons are functionally defined by their ability to produce msDNA while deliberately avoiding speculation about other possible activities.

== Function ==
Thousands of retrons have been predicted bioinformatically in bacterial genomes. Yet for nearly four decades since their discovery, the function of msDNA/retrons was unknown even though many copies are present within cells. Early studies showed that knockout mutations that do not express msDNA are viable, so the production of msDNA is not essential to life under laboratory conditions. Over-expression of msDNA is mutagenic, apparently as a result of titrating out repair proteins by the mismatched base pairs that are typical of their structure. It was suggested that msDNA may have some role in pathogenicity or the adaptation to stressful conditions.

Sequence comparison of msDNAs from Myxococcus xanthus, Stigmatella aurantiaca, and many other bacteria revealed conserved and hypervariable domains reminiscent of conserved and hypervariable sequences found in allorecognition molecules. The major msDNAs of M. xanthus and S. aurantiaca, for instance, share 94% sequence homology except within a 19 base-pair domain that shares sequence homology of only 42%. The presence of such domains is significant because myxobacteria exhibit complex cooperative social behaviors including swarming and formation of fruiting bodies, while E. coli and other pathogenic bacteria form biofilms that exhibit enhanced antibiotic and detergent resistance. The sustainability of social assemblies that require significant individual investment of energy is generally dependent on the evolution of allorecognition mechanisms that enable groups to distinguish self versus non-self.

Other speculative proposals for the widespread distribution of retrons include the notion that they may be selfish genetic elements, may involved in a bacterium's starvation response, or may be involved in cell specialization. However, evidence for these proposed functions was strictly circumstantial.

Recently, there has been growing evidence that retrons may play a role in bacterial immune defense against phage infection, as part of a defensive unit composed of three components: The reverse transcriptase, the non-coding RNA precursor to msDNA (ncRNA), and an effector protein. The retron appears to "guard" RecBCD, which is involved in the repair of DNA double-strand breaks through homologous recombination and which is a central part of various anti-phage immunity mechanisms in bacteria. Multiple phages inhibit RecBCD as part of their infective mechanism. In retron-containing bacteria, however, inhibition of RecBCD leads to activation of the retron, resulting in abortive infection (i.e. bacterial suicide as an antiviral immune response). Retrons hence provide a backup line of defense in situations where the integrity of the bacterial immune system is damaged.

== Biosynthesis ==
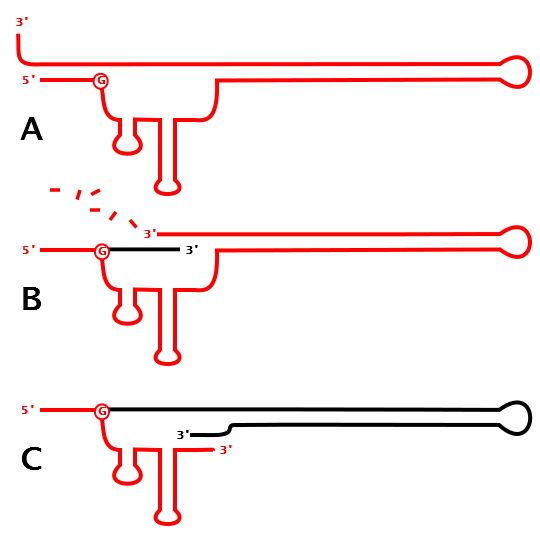
Proposed mechanism for the synthesis of msDNA. (A) Folding of the primer-template RNA into a secondary structure allows the 2'-OH group of a specific branching G residue to serve as a primer to initiate cDNA synthesis by the retron reverse transcriptase. (B) Synthesis of cDNA is accompanied by RNase H digestion of the template strand. (C) In the completed msDNA molecule, part of the RNA template remains joined to the 5' end of the cDNA.

Biosynthesis of msDNA is purported to follow a unique pathway found nowhere else in DNA/RNA biochemistry. Because of the similarity of the 2'-5' branch junction to the branch junctions found in RNA splicing intermediates, it might at first have been expected that branch formation would be via spliceosome- or ribozyme-mediated ligation. Surprisingly, however, experiments in cell-free systems using purified retron reverse transcriptase indicate that cDNA synthesis is directly primed from the 2'-OH group of the specific internal G residue of the primer RNA. The RT recognizes specific stem-loop structures in the precursor RNA, rendering synthesis of msDNA by the RT highly specific to its own retron. The priming of msDNA synthesis offers a fascinating challenge to our understanding of DNA synthesis. DNA polymerases (which include RT) share highly conserved structural features, which means that their active catalytic sites vary little from species to species, or even between DNA polymerases using DNA as a template, versus DNA polymerases using RNA as a template. The catalytic region of eukaryotic reverse transcriptase comprises three domains termed the "fingers", "palm", and "thumb" which hold the double-stranded primer-template in a right-hand grip with the 3'-OH of the primer buried in the active site of the polymerase, a cluster of highly conserved acidic and polar residues situated on the palm between what would be the index and middle fingers. In eukaryotic RTs, the RNase H domain lies on the wrist below the base of the thumb, but retron RTs lack RNase H activity. The nucleic acid binding cleft, extending from the polymerase active site to the RNase H active site, is about 60 Å in length in eukaryotic RTs, corresponding to nearly two helical turns. When eukaryotic RT extends a conventional primer, the growing DNA/RNA double helix spirals along the cleft, and as the double helix passes the RNase H domain, the template RNA is digested to release the nascent strand of cDNA. In the case of msDNA primer extension, however, a long strand of RNA remains attached to the 3'-OH of the priming G. Although it is possible to model an RT-primer template complex which would make the 2'-OH accessible for the priming reaction, further extension of the DNA strand presents a problem: as DNA synthesis progresses, the bulky RNA strand extending from the 3'-OH needs somehow to spiral down the binding cleft without being blocked by steric hindrance. To overcome this issue, the msDNA reverse transcriptase clearly would require special features not shared by other RTs.
