= Stigmatella aurantiaca =

Scientific classification
- Domain: Bacteria
- Kingdom: Pseudomonadati
- Phylum: Myxococcota
- Class: Myxococcia
- Order: Myxococcales
- Family: Myxococcaceae
- Genus: Stigmatella
- Species: S. aurantiaca

Binomial name
- Stigmatella aurantiaca Berkeley and Curtis 1875

Species of bacterium

Stigmatella aurantiaca is a member of myxobacteria, a group of gram-negative bacteria with a complex developmental life cycle.

== Classification ==
The bacterial nature of this organism was recognized by Thaxter in 1892, who grouped it among the Chrondromyces. It had been described several times before, but had been misclassified as a member of the fungi imperfecti. More recent investigations have shown that, contrary to Thaxter's classification, this organism is not closely related to Chrondromyces, and Stigmatella is currently recognized as a separate genus. Of the three major subgroups of the myxobacteria, Myxococcus, Nannocystis, and Chrondromyces, Stigmatella is most closely aligned with Myxococcus.

== Life cycle ==
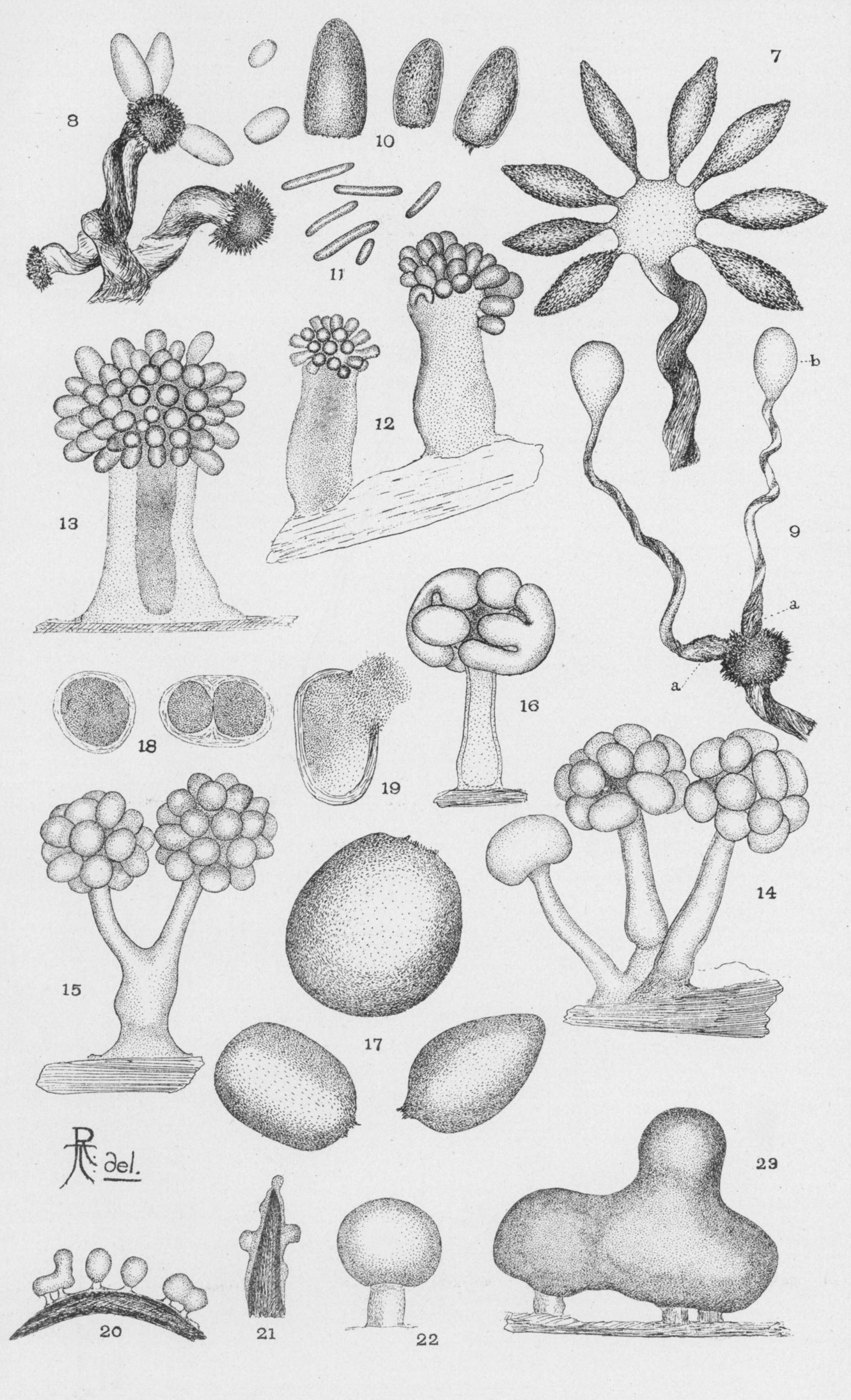
Three species of myxobacteria: Chondromyces crocatus (figs. 7–11), Stigmatella aurantiaca (figs. 12–19) and Melittangium lichenicola (figs. 20–23).

S. aurantiaca, like other myxobacterial species, has a complex life cycle including social gliding (swarming), fruiting body formation, and predatory feeding behaviors. The bacteria do not swim, but glide on surfaces leaving slime trails, forming a mobile biofilm. It commonly grows on the surface of rotting soft woods or fungi, where it may form bright orange patches.

During the vegetative portion of their life cycles, swarming enables coordinated masses of myxobacteria to pool their secretions of extracellular digestive enzymes which are used to kill and consume prey microorganisms, a bacterial "wolfpack" effect. The best studied of the myxobacteria, Myxococcus xanthus, has been shown to actively surround prey organisms, trapping them in pockets where they can be consumed. Roaming flares of M. xanthus can detect clumps of prey bacteria at a distance, making turns towards the clumps and moving directly towards them.

Like other myxobacterial species, S. aurantiaca survives periods of starvation by undergoing a developmental process whereby the individuals of a swarm aggregate to form fruiting bodies (not to be confused with those in fungi). Within the fruiting bodies, a certain fraction of the cells differentiate into myxospores, which are dormant cells resistant to drying and temperatures up to 90 °C. Differentiation into fruiting bodies appears to be mediated by contact-mediated signaling.

Under laboratory growth conditions, the ability to undergo differentiation to form fruiting bodies is rapidly lost unless the cultures are regularly forced to fruit by transferring to starvation media. Shaker cultures of S. aurantiaca permanently lose the ability to fruit.

The complex life cycle of myxobacteria is reminiscent of the life cycle of eukaryotic cellular slime molds.

== Genome structure ==
Taxonomic identifier: 378806

See also: NCBI UniProtKB

Stigmatella aurantiaca DW4/3-1, a common laboratory strain, has been completely sequenced (See NCBI record link given above). Its circular DNA chromosome consists of 10.26 million base pairs and has a GC content of 67.5%. 8407 genes have been identified, coding for 8352 proteins.

== Cell structure ==
The vegetative cells of S. aurantiaca are elongated rods typically measuring about 5–8 μm long and 0.7–0.8 μm wide. The fine structure resembles that of other gram negative bacteria. The cell surface consists of a cytoplasmic membrane with a typical triple layered organization and a cell wall. The cell wall consists of an outer triple layer and third dense monolayer in the periplasm.

The myxospores are short, optically refractile rods measuring about 2.6–3.5 μm by 0.9–1.2 μm. The brightly colored, red or orange fruiting bodies comprise 1 to 20 spherical or ovoid cysts measuring 40–60 μm by 25–45 μm on top of a stalk measuring 60 to 140 μ high. Each red-brown cyst contains thousands of myxospores surrounded by thick, fibrous capsules. Dispersal of cysts is thought to benefit myxobacteria by ensuring that cell growth is resumed with a group (swarm) of myxobacteria, rather than as isolated cells. The stalks consist mostly of tubules which may represent the debris of lysed swarm cells, as well as some unlysed cells; very little fibrous material interpretable as slime is seen.

== Ecology ==
Stigmatella aurantiaca is found on rotting wood or fungi and is only rarely found in soil samples. Secreted and non-secreted proteins involved in their feeding behaviors, either identified directly or speculatively identified on the basis of proteome analysis, include enzymes capable of breaking down a wide selection of peptidoglycans, polysaccharides, proteins and other cellular detritus. Various other secreted compounds possibly involved in predation include antibiotics such as stigmatellin, which is toxic for yeast and filamentous fungi but not most bacteria, and aurafuron A and B, which inhibits the growth of various filamentous fungi.

Stigmatella species hence appear in nature to help decompose otherwise insoluble biological debris. It is only distantly related to the cellulolytic myxobacteria, does not produce cellulases, and is strongly bacteriolytic. Therefore, Stigmatella consumes organisms that feed on wood rather that feeding on wood directly. Besides bacteria, its production of antifungal antibiotics suggests that Stigmatella species may feed on yeasts and fungi as well, or alternatively, may suggest that Stigmatella competes with fungi for shared resources. By producing antimicrobial compounds, Stigmatella may play a role in maintaining the balance of the microbial population in its habitat.

== Current Research ==
=== Model system for development ===
Myxobacteria are distinguished from most bacteria by their remarkable range of social behaviors, and as a result, multiple laboratories have taken up studies of these bacteria as a prokaryotic paradigm for differentiation processes and signal transduction. Most studies on social behavior in the myxobacteria have focused on M. xanthus, which has provided an excellent system amenable to many classical genetic experimental approaches. The fruiting bodies of M. xanthus are relatively simple mounds, and the considerably more elaborate fruiting structures produced by S. aurantiaca has led to S. aurantiaca being considered an excellent complementary system to M. xanthus, especially given the advent of contemporary means of genomic analysis. Most of the 95 known M. xanthus development-specific genes are highly conserved in S. aurantiaca. Genes for entire signal transduction pathways important for fruiting body formation in M. xanthus are conserved in S. aurantiaca, whereas only a few are conserved in Anaeromyxobacter dehalogenans, a non-fruiting member of the order Myxococcales.

Various genes have been identified in S. aurantiaca involved in the process of fruiting body formation, including fbfA, which encodes a polypeptide homologous to chitin synthases, fbfB, a gene encoding a putative galactose oxidase, various genes including those encoding tRNA^{Asp} and tRNA^{Val} located at the attB locus (a phage attachment site), and so forth. These genes play a variety of roles in the developmental cycle. For example, in experiments where the fbFA gene was deactivated, the bacterium formed structured clumps instead of fruiting bodies.

To control formation of the elaborate and spatially complex multicellular structure which is the fruiting body, the cells must exchange signals during the entire process. In M. xanthus, various signal molecules involved in this process have been identified. In S. aurantiaca, Stevens (1982) identified an extracellular, diffusible signaling molecule (pheromone) that could substitute for light in stimulating fruiting body maturation. A few years later, the structure of this molecule, a hydroxy ketone named stigmolone, was determined by NMR and mass spectroscopy.

Besides signaling via exchange of diffusible substances, cell-cell signaling can be mediated by contact through the activity of surface located macromolecules. An example of this in S. aurantiaca would be the csgA homolog to the M. xanthus gene, which is bound to the cell envelope. The csgA gene product helps the cells to stay together during development and regulates motility of the cells.

Pxr sRNA is a regulatory RNA which downregulates genes responsible for the formation of fruiting bodies in M. xanthus, and a homolog has been noted in S. aurantiaca. Another short nucleic acid that has been speculatively linked to cell–cell recognition is multicopy single-stranded DNA (msDNA). Sequence comparison of msDNAs from M. xanthus, S. aurantiaca, and other bacteria reveal conserved and hypervariable domains reminiscent of conserved and hypervariable sequences found in allorecognition molecules.

Another means for intercellular signaling could be via the exchange of outer membrane vesicles (OMVs). These vesicles are produced from the outer membrane of myxobacterial cells and are found in large quantities within bacterial biofilms. OMVs appear to play a variety of roles in myxobacterial swarming, predation, and development.

=== Natural secondary metabolites ===
Natural products have been the source of most of the active ingredients in medicine, and continue to be an important source despite the advent of automated high-throughput screening methods for drug discovery in synthetic compounds.

Historically, actinomycetes and fungi have been the major source of microbial secondary metabolites found useful as starting points for the development of new drugs, but the last several decades have seen myxobacteria come to the forefront of drug research. The pharmaceutical interest in these organisms comes from their production of a wide variety of structurally unique metabolites with interesting biological activities. The epothilones, derived from the myxobacterium Sporangium cellulosum, represent a new, recently approved class of cancer drugs. Other myxobacterial compounds of potential pharmaceutical interest include disorazol, tubulysin, rhizopodin, chondramid, the aurafurons, tuscolid, tuscuron, and dawenol, chivosazol, soraphen, myxochelin, and the leupyrrins.

Stigmatella aurantiaca has been the source of several of these bioactive compounds, including myxothiazol, an inhibitor of the electron transport chain, dawenol, a polyene metabolite, stigmatellin, an antifungal agent, the antifungals aurafuron A and B, and the iron siderophores myxochelin A and B.
