= Haliangium =

Scientific classification
- Domain: Bacteria
- Kingdom: Pseudomonadati
- Phylum: Myxococcota
- Class: Myxococcia
- Order: Myxococcales
- Family: Kofleriaceae
- Genus: Haliangium; Fudou et al. 2002

Type species
- Haliangium ochraceum Fudou et al. 2002

Species
- H. ochraceum; H. tepidum

Synonyms
- Haliangoium (sic)

Genus of bacteria

Haliangium is a genus of bacteria from the family Kofleriaceae. Haliangium bacteria produce the antifungal compounds haliangicins.

== See also ==
- List of bacterial orders
- List of bacteria genera
