= Stigmergy =

Social network mechanism of indirect coordination

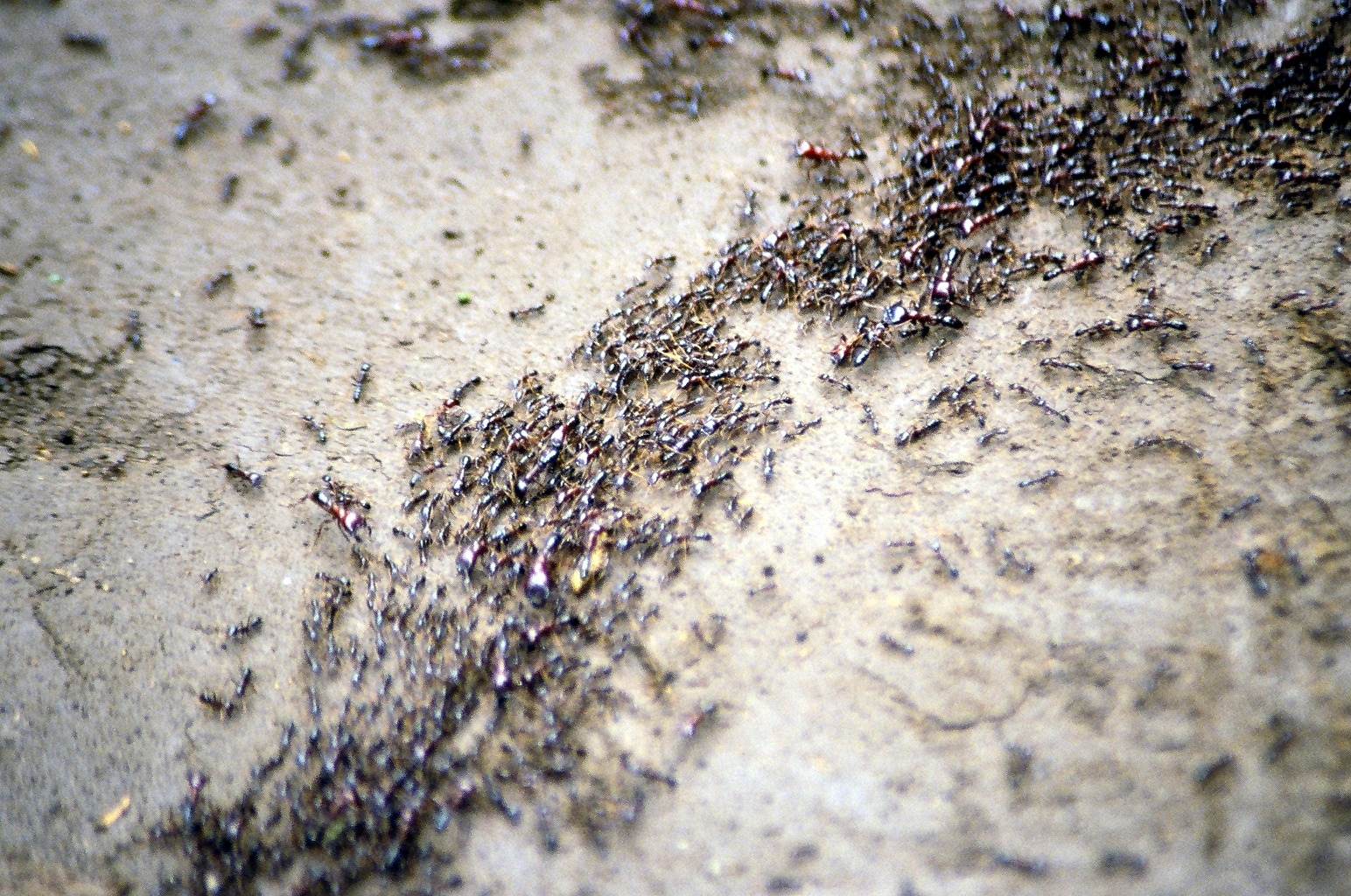
Ant paths built from pheromone traces

Stigmergy (/ˈstɪɡmərdʒi/ STIG-mər-jee) is a mechanism of indirect coordination, through the environment, between agents or actions. The principle is that the trace left in the environment by an individual action stimulates the performance of a succeeding action by the same or different agent. Agents that respond to traces in the environment receive positive fitness benefits, reinforcing the likelihood of these behaviors' becoming fixed within a population over time.

Stigmergy is a form of self-organization. It produces complex, seemingly intelligent structures, without need for any planning, control, or even direct communication between the agents. As such it supports efficient collaboration between extremely simple agents, who may lack memory or individual awareness of one another. By offloading memory to the environment (as stigmergic traces), and computation to interaction between agents and traces, complex distributed cognition is performed by remarkably simple organisms. This form of cognition long predates neurons in evolutionary history.

== History ==
The term "stigmergy" was introduced by the French biologist Pierre-Paul Grassé in 1959 to refer to termite behavior. He defined it as "stimulation of workers by the performance they have achieved." It is derived from the Greek words στίγμα stigma "mark, sign" and ἔργον ergon "work, action", and captures the notion that an agent’s actions leave signs in the environment, signs that it and other agents sense and that determine and incite their subsequent actions.

Later on, a distinction was made between the stigmergic phenomenon, which is specific to the guidance of additional work, and the more general, non-work specific incitation, for which the term sematectonic communication was coined by E. O. Wilson, from the Greek words σῆμα sema "sign, token", and τέκτων tecton "craftsman, builder": "There is a need for a more general, somewhat less clumsy expression to denote the evocation of any form of behavior or physiological change by the evidences of work performed by other animals, including the special case of the guidance of additional work."

Stigmergy is now one of the key concepts in the field of swarm intelligence.

== Stigmergic behavior in non-human organisms ==
Stigmergy was first observed in social insects. For example, ants exchange information by laying down pheromones (the trace) on their way back to the nest when they have found food. In that way, they collectively develop a complex network of trails, connecting the nest in an efficient way to various food sources. When ants come out of the nest searching for food, they are stimulated by the pheromone to follow the trail towards the food source. The network of trails functions as a shared external memory for the ant colony.

In computer science, this general method has been applied in a variety of techniques called ant colony optimization, which search for solutions to complex problems by depositing "virtual pheromones" along paths that appear promising. In the field of artificial neural networks, stigmergy can be used as a computational memory. Federico Galatolo showed that a stigmergic memory can achieve the same performances of more complex and well established neural networks architectures like LSTM.

Other eusocial creatures, such as termites, use pheromones to build their complex nests by following a simple decentralized rule set. Each insect scoops up a 'mudball' or similar material from its environment, infuses the ball with pheromones, and deposits it on the ground, initially in a random spot. However, termites are attracted to their nestmates' pheromones and are therefore more likely to drop their own mudballs on top of their neighbors'. The larger the heap of mud becomes, the more attractive it is, and therefore the more mud will be added to it (positive feedback). Over time this leads to the construction of pillars, arches, tunnels and chambers.

Stigmergy has been observed in bacteria, various species of which differentiate into distinct cell types and which participate in group behaviors that are guided by sophisticated temporal and spatial control systems. Spectacular examples of multicellular behavior can be found among the myxobacteria. Myxobacteria travel in swarms containing many cells kept together by intercellular molecular signals. Most myxobacteria are predatory: individuals benefit from aggregation as it allows accumulation of extracellular enzymes which are used to digest prey microorganisms. When nutrients are scarce, myxobacterial cells aggregate into fruiting bodies, within which the swarming cells transform themselves into dormant myxospores with thick cell walls. The fruiting process is thought to benefit myxobacteria by ensuring that cell growth is resumed with a group (swarm) of myxobacteria, rather than isolated cells. Similar life cycles have developed among the cellular slime molds. The best known of the myxobacteria, Myxococcus xanthus and Stigmatella aurantiaca, are studied in various laboratories as prokaryotic models of development.

== Analysis of human behavior ==
Stigmergy studied in eusocial creatures and physical systems, has been proposed as a model of analyzing some robotics systems, multi-agent systems, communication in computer networks, and online communities.

On the Internet there are many collective projects where users interact only by modifying local parts of their shared virtual environment. Wikipedia is an example of this. The massive structure of information available in a wiki, or an open source software project such as the FreeBSD kernel could be compared to a termite nest; one initial user leaves a seed of an idea (a mudball) which attracts other users who then build upon and modify this initial concept, eventually constructing an elaborate structure of connected thoughts.

In addition the concept of stigmergy has also been used to describe how cooperative work such as building design may be integrated. Designing a large contemporary building involves a large and diverse network of actors (e.g. architects, building engineers, static engineers, building services engineers). Their distributed activities may be partly integrated through practices of stigmergy.

=== Analysis of human social movements ===
The rise of open source software in the 21st century has disrupted the business models of some proprietary software providers, and open content projects like Wikipedia have threatened the business models of companies like Britannica. Researchers have studied collaborative open source projects, arguing they provide insights into the emergence of large-scale peer production and the growth of gift economy.

=== Stigmergic society ===
Heather Marsh, associated with the Occupy Movement, Wikileaks, and Anonymous, has proposed a new social system where competition as a driving force would be replaced with a more collaborative society. This proposed society would not use representative democracy but new forms of idea and action based governance and collaborative methods including stigmergy. "With stigmergy, an initial idea is freely given, and the project is driven by the idea, not by a personality or group of personalities. No individual needs permission (competitive) or consensus (cooperative) to propose an idea or initiate a project."

Some at the Hong Kong Umbrella Movement in 2014 were quoted recommending stigmergy as a way forward.

== See also ==
- Ant mill
- Biosemiotics
- Extended mind thesis
- Path dependence
- Spontaneous order
