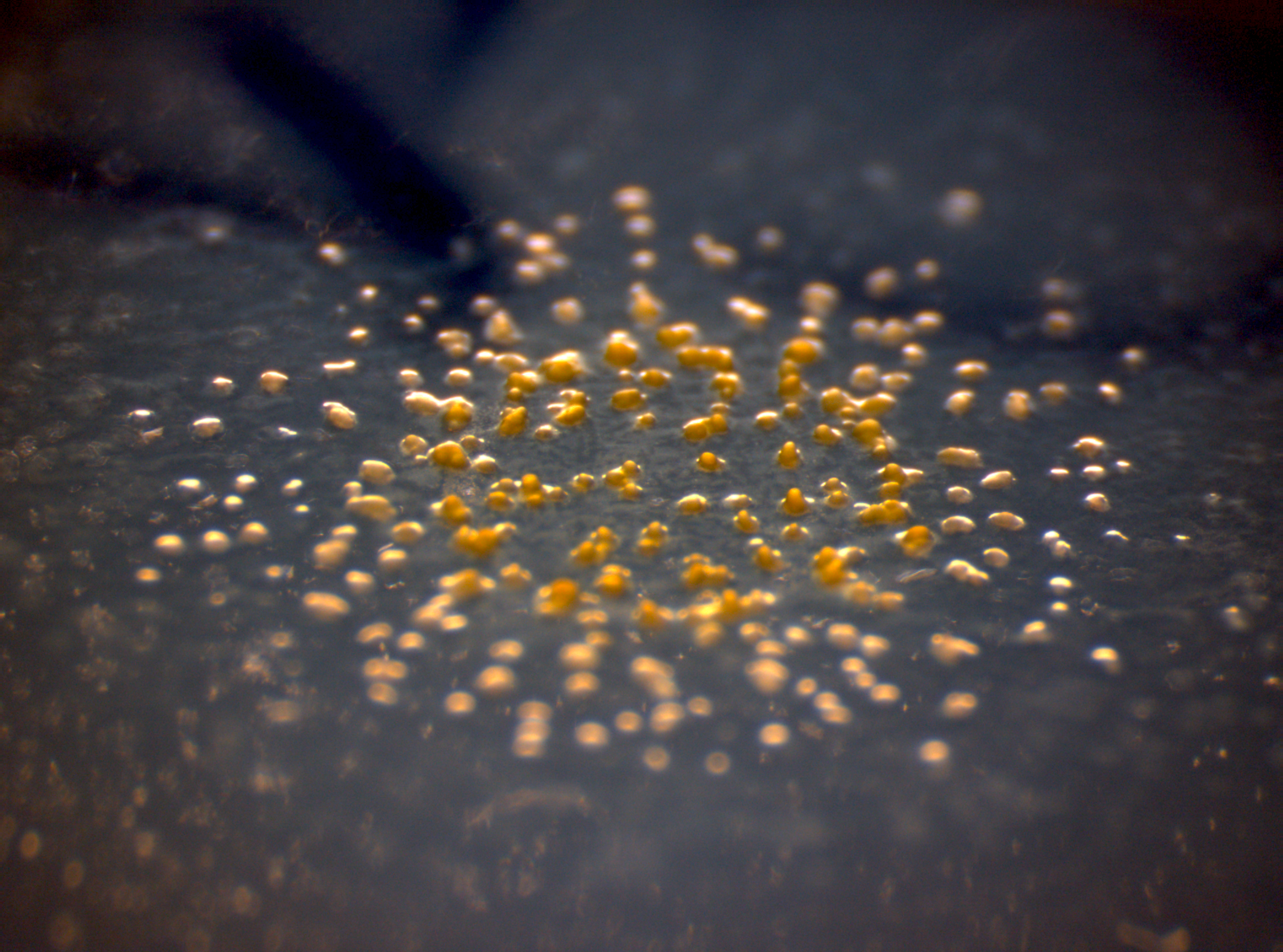
- Fruiting bodies of M. xanthus

Scientific classification
- Domain: Bacteria
- Kingdom: Pseudomonadati
- Phylum: Myxococcota
- Class: Myxococcia
- Order: Myxococcales
- Family: Myxococcaceae
- Genus: Myxococcus; Thaxter 1892

Type species
- Myxococcus rubescens (Cohn 1875) Jahn 1911

Species
- See text

Synonyms
- Myxococcus section "Simplices" Jahn 1911; Myxococcus section "Stipitatae" Jahn 1911; "Pseudomyxococcus" Das et al. 2025; Pyxidicoccus corrig. Reichenbach 2007

= Myxococcus =

Genus of bacteria

Myxococcus is a genus of bacteria in the family Myxococcaceae. Myxococci are gram-negative, spore-forming, chemoorganotrophic, obligate aerobes. They are elongated rods with rounded or tapered ends, and they are nonflagellated. The cells utilize gliding motility to move and can predate other bacteria. The genus has been isolated from soil.

== Taxonomy ==
At least eleven species had been identified with confidence by late 2020 and each had been characterised to some extent. As well as using traditional biochemical tests, strains of some species had been compared using whole genome sequences. This approach has provided evidence that the genus, like most bacterial genera, has a core set of genes found in all members of the genus, along with others that are confined to particular species. The identity of Myxococcus species therefore continues to change. An example where taxonomy may be changed is that comparisons of genome sequences and biochemical tests indicated that M. xanthus and M. virescens were not distinguishable.

== Description ==
Myxococcus are known to form fruiting bodies using chemical signals. The cells communicate with each other, and in response to stress factors, most often starvation, form dense fruiting bodies that allow them to survive harsh environments. The genetic programs underlying fruiting body formation in Myxococcus exhibit an unexpected level of plasticity, suggesting that the genetic program underlying fruiting body formation in various Myxococci is not conserved, leading to diverse reactions in all Myxococcus species. Myxococcus, specifically Myxococcus xanthus, has been found to use direct communication between cells to form fruiting bodies rather than chemotaxis.

Myxococcus are social microbes and often seen as exhibiting behavior akin to a pack of wolves. They are able to communicate with each other via quorum sensing. In Myxococcus, quorum sensing is mediated by two signaling molecules: A-factor and C-signal. A-factor is a small, diffusible molecule produced by all cells in the population. When the concentration of A-factor reaches a certain threshold, it binds to receptors on the surface of cells and triggers a cascade of events that leads to aggregation.

Myxococcus secretes antibiotics and bacteriolytic enzymes to kill prey. Because of this, there has been speculation of using Myxococcus as an antibiotic.

== Sources ==
- "Myxococcus". The Encyclopedia of Life.

== Phylogeny ==
The currently accepted taxonomy is based on the List of Prokaryotic names with Standing in Nomenclature (LPSN) and National Center for Biotechnology Information (NCBI).

16S rRNA based LTP_10_2024

- Myxococcus
  - - - Pyxidicoccus fallax
      - M. fulvus
    - - M. dinghuensis
      - M. stipitatus
  - - Pyxidicoccus xibeiensis
    - - Pyxidicoccus trucidator
      - - M. guangdongensis
        - - - M. qinghaiensis
            - - M. eversor
              - M. llanfairpwllgwyngyllgogerychwyrndrobwllllantysiliogogogochensis
          - - M. macrosporus
            - - M. vastator
              - - M. virescens
                - M. xanthus

120 marker proteins based GTDB 10-RS226

- Myxococcus
  - - M. dinghuensis Wang et al. 2023
    - - - M. guangdongensis Wang et al. 2023
        - M. fulvus (Cohn 1875) Jahn 1911
      - - - M. landrumensis corrig. Ahearne et al. 2025
          - M. stipitatus Thaxter 1897
        - - M. llanfairpwllgwyngyllgogerychwyrndrobwllllantysiliogogogochensis Chambers et al. 2021
          - - M. eversor Chambers et al. 2021
            - M. qinghaiensis Wang et al. 2023
  - - - Pyxidicoccus fallax corrig. Reichenbach 2007
      - - Pyxidicoccus parkwayensis corrig. Ahearne et al. 2025
        - - "Pyxidicoccus caerfyrddinensis" Chambers et al. 2020
          - - Pyxidicoccus trucidator Chambers et al. 2020
            - Pyxidicoccus xibeiensis Wang et al. 2023
    - - "M. hansupus" Sharma et al. 2016
      - - M. macrosporus (Krzemieniewska & Krzemieniewski 1926) Zahler & McCurdy 1974 non Zukal 1897
        - - M. vastator Chambers et al. 2021
          - - M. virescens Thaxter 1892
            - M. xanthus Beebe 1941

== See also ==
- List of bacterial orders
- List of bacteria genera
