= Cystobacter =

Scientific classification
- Domain: Bacteria
- Kingdom: Pseudomonadati
- Phylum: Myxococcota
- Class: Myxococcia
- Order: Myxococcales
- Family: Myxococcaceae
- Genus: Cystobacter; Schroeter 1886

Type species
- Cystobacter fuscus Schroeter 1886

Species
- See text

Synonyms
- Polyangium section "Fuscae" Jahn 1911

Genus of bacteria

Cystobacter is a genus in the phylum Myxococcota (Bacteria).

== Etymology ==
The genus name stems from Greek noun κύστις (kustis), meaning "bladder" and Neo-Latin masculine noun bacter "rod" consequently the Neo-Latin masculine noun Cystobacter means bladder-forming rod.

== Species ==
The genus contains 8 species (including basonyms and synonyms), namely

- C. armeniaca Reichenbach 2007 (L. fem. n. armeniaca, an apricot-tree, intended to mean apricot-colored.)
- C. badius Reichenbach 2007 (L. masc. adj. badius, chestnut brown.)
- C. ferrugineus (Krzemieniewska and Krzemieniewski 1927) McCurdy 1970 (L. masc. adj. ferrugineus, of the color of iron-rust, dark-red.)
- C. fuscus Schroeter 1886 (L. masc. adj. fuscus, dark, swarthy, dusky, tawny.)
- C. miniatus Reichenbach 2007 (L. masc. part. adj. miniatus, cinnabar-red.)
- C. velatus Reichenbach 2007 (L. part. adj. velatus, veiled, covered.)

== Phylogeny ==
The currently accepted taxonomy is based on the List of Prokaryotic names with Standing in Nomenclature (LPSN) and National Center for Biotechnology Information (NCBI).

16S rRNA based LTP_10_2024

- - - Melittangium boletus Jahn 1924
    - - Cystobacter~
        - Cystobacter armeniaca Reichenbach 2007
        - Cystobacter miniatus Reichenbach 2007
  - - Cystobacter
      - C. velatus Reichenbach 2007
      - - C. fuscus Schroeter 1886
        - - C. badius Reichenbach 2007
          - C. ferrugineus (Krzemieniewska & Krzemieniewski 1927) McCurdy 1970

120 marker proteins based GTDB 10-RS226

- - Melittangium
    - "Archangium primigenium" (Quehl 1906) Jahn 1924 nom. nud.
    - Melittangium boletus
  - Cystobacter
    - C. ferrugineus
    - C. fuscus

== See also ==
- Bacterial taxonomy
- Microbiology
- List of bacterial orders
- List of bacteria genera
