= Vulgatibacter =

Scientific classification
- Domain: Bacteria
- Kingdom: Pseudomonadati
- Phylum: Myxococcota
- Class: Myxococcia
- Order: Myxococcales
- Family: Vulgatibacteraceae; Yamamoto, Muramatsu & Nagai 2014
- Genus: Vulgatibacter; Yamamoto, Muramatsu & Nagai 2014

Type species
- Vulgatibacter incomptus Yamamoto, Muramatsu & Nagai 2014

Species
- V. incomptus

Family of bacteria

Vulgatibacteraceae is a monotypic family of bacteria in the order Myxococcales, containing one species in one genus; Vulgatibacter incomptus. The bacteria were first isolated from soil samples from Yakushima in 2014. The bacteria of this family are motile rods, and, like all myxococcota, are gram-negative. The one species, Vulgatibacter incomptus (initially designated strain B00001^{T}) is believed to be most closely related to the species Cystobacter armeniaca and Anaeromyxobacter dehalogenans.

== See also ==
- List of bacterial orders
- List of bacteria genera
