= Protein S (Myxococcus xanthus) =

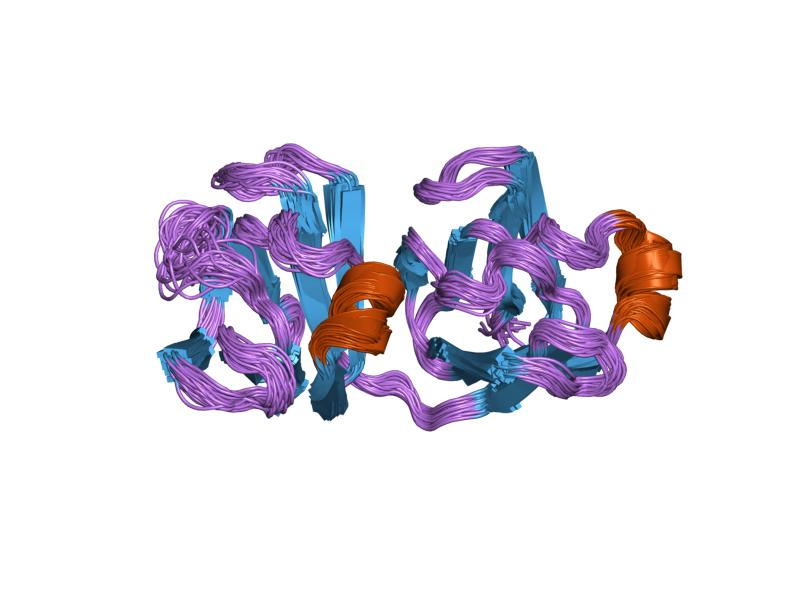
- Structure of Protein S.

Identifiers
- Symbol: PRS
- SCOP2: 1PRS / SCOPe / SUPFAM

Protein S is a protein found in Myxococcus xanthus. Its name derives from being the "S" band in an alphabetical ordering of proteins run from Myxococcus xanthus cell contents on a SDS-denaturing gel. Its study was initially prompted by the huge increase in Protein S production during sporulation of Myxococcus xanthus.

== Function ==
Though it has been purported as recently as 1994 that Protein S enables myxospores of Myxococcus xanthus higher resistance to endure heating, desiccation, UV radiation and sonication no such evidence exists. The work that cites claims no such evidence:

Protein S is not essential for spore variability and resistance: protein S-deficient spores are viable and are as resistant to heat and sonication as complete spores; glycerol spores lack protein S but are resistant to sonication and heat

— Inoyue et al.

and there are other studies that also found that there is no increase in resistance when Protein S is eliminated.

== Structure ==
=== Overview ===
Protein S is structured into two domains. The two domains are highly homologous and have a Greek key structure. The domains share high similarity with other crystallin proteins.

=== Binding Site ===
Protein S binds two 2 mol of calcium per mol of protein with a binding dissociation constant of 27 and 76 μM according to dialysis experiments. In the same study mutagenesis experiments revealed arginine replacements to residue 40 or residue 129 can reduce the binding affinity. Since then, an NMR structure determine positions for the two binding sites at residues 10 and 71 and also at residues 99 and 159. However, these binding sites were based on a cluster analysis of side-chain oxygen atoms and on results from site-directed mutagenesis studies and not yet experimentally verified. More recently, an X-ray crystal structure on the truncated N-terminal domain revealed crystallographic evidence of two binding sites in the N-terminal domain. These binding sites are at residues 7,37,39 and 76 as well as at residues 36,77, and 79, which agree with the mutagenesis experiments. However, if the N-terminal domain can bind two Ca2+ then either only the N-terminal domain binds calcium, or, the full Protein S can bind more than two mol of calcium per mol of protein. Since both these claims have been experimentally shown to not be true then the exact binding site of Protein S cannot yet fully be described.
