= Stigmatella =

Stigmatella may refer to:

- Stigmatella (bacterium), a genus of Myxobacteria in the family Archangiaceae
- Stigmatella (bryozoan), a genus of prehistoric bryozoans in the family Heterotrypidae
