= PXR (disambiguation) =

PXR could refer to:

- Pregnane X receptor, a protein
- Pixar Image Computer (an image file format .pxr)
- Pony Express Record, an album by group Shudder to Think
- IATA code for Surin Airport in Thailand

== See also ==
- Pxr sRNA, a regulatory RNA
- PXR5, ninth studio album by Hawkwind
