= Pxr sRNA =

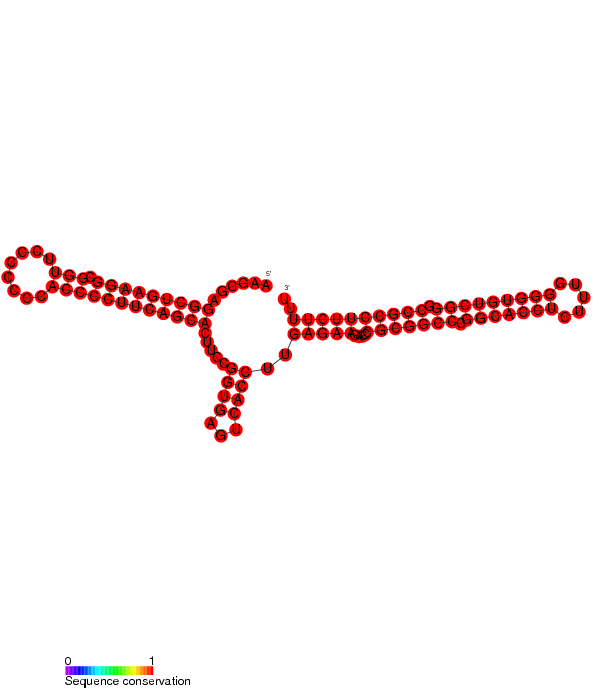
- Secondary structure of Pxr sRNA.

Identifiers
- Symbol: Pxr
- Rfam: RF01812

Other data
- RNA type: sRNA
- Domain(s): Myxococcus xanthus, Stigmatella aurantiaca
- PDB structures: PDBe

Pxr sRNA is a regulatory RNA which downregulates genes responsible for the formation of fruiting bodies in Myxococcus xanthus. Fruiting bodies are aggregations of myxobacteria formed when nutrients are scarce, the fruiting bodies permit a small number of the aggregated colony to transform into stress-resistant spores.

Pxr exists in two forms: Pxr-L (a long form) and Pxr-S which is shorter. The short form was found to be expressed in cells during growth but is rapidly repressed during starvation. This finding implies that Pxr-S is specifically responsible for inhibiting the fruiting body development during cell growth when nutrients are abundant.

Pxr homologs have only been found in one other taxon, namely Stigmatella aurantiaca. Homologs were not found in any other myxobacteria (such as Sorangium cellulosum or Anaeromyxobacter dehalogenans) which suggests the Pxr RNA gene may have a recent evolutionary origin in the sub-clade Myxococcales.

PxR sRNA folds into 3 steam loops. SL1 and SL 2 are highly conserved across mycobacteria and SL1 is necessary for the regulatory function. However, a conserved eight-base-pair segment of the variable SL3 is necessary for PxR accumulation and multicellular development.

== M. xanthus obligate cheat and phoenix phenotypes ==
Several mutations in the Pxr sRNA gene have been observed. The first mutation causes an obligate cheat (OC) phenotype to emerge, these bacteria exploit the fruiting bodies of wild-type M. xanthus to sporulate more efficiently. This phenotype is thought to be caused by a mutation which prevents the repression of Pxr-S, thereby inhibiting the formation of fruiting bodies indefinitely. If Pxr-S is derived from Pxr-L, it may be that RNAi-like processing elements have been knocked out.

In a laboratory experiment, the OC phenotype out-competed and excluded the wild type, eventually bringing about a population crash when there were not enough wild type bacteria to exploit. After this event, a new phenotype emerged via spontaneous mutation dubbed phoenix (PX). The PX phenotype was developmentally superior to both OC and wt, it was able to sporulate autonomously - without forming fruiting bodies and with high efficiency. Two-component system operon (histidine kinase gene and a σ54 response regulator) is associated with production and processing of Pxr sRNA.
