= Stigmatella (bacterium) =

Scientific classification
- Domain: Bacteria
- Kingdom: Pseudomonadati
- Phylum: Myxococcota
- Class: Myxococcia
- Order: Myxococcales
- Family: Myxococcaceae
- Genus: Stigmatella; Berkeley and Curtis 1875

Type species
- Stigmatella aurantiaca Berkeley & Curtis 1857 ex Berkeley & Curtis 1875

Species
- S. ashevillena; S. aurantiaca; S. erecta; S. hybrida; "S. koreensis"

Synonyms
- "Podangium" Jahn 1924; "Polycephalum" Kalchbrenner & Cooke 1880

Genus of bacteria

Stigmatella is a bacterium genus in the phylum Myxococcota.

== Etymology ==
The name Stigmatella derives from:
Latin neuter gender noun stigma -atis, brand, mark; Latin feminine gender dim. ending -ella; Neo-Latin feminine gender noun Stigmatella, small dark spot.

== Species ==
The genus contains three species (including basonyms and synonyms), namely

- S. aurantiaca Berkeley and Curtis 1875 ((Type species of the genus).; Neo-Latin feminine gender adjective aurantiaca, orange colored.)
- S. erecta (Schroeter 1886) McCurdy 1971 (Latin feminine gender participle adjective erecta (from Latin v. erigo), erected, raised.)
- S. hybrida Reichenbach 2007 (Latin feminine gender adjective hybrida, half-breed, bastard.)

== Phylogeny ==
The currently accepted taxonomy is based on the List of Prokaryotic names with Standing in Nomenclature (LPSN) and National Center for Biotechnology Information (NCBI).

16S rRNA based LTP_10_2024

- Stigmatella
  - S. aurantiaca Berkeley & Curtis 1857 ex Berkeley & Curtis 1875
  - - S. erecta (Schroeter 1886) McCurdy 1971
    - S. hybrida Reichenbach 2007

120 marker proteins based GTDB 10-RS226

- Stigmatella
  - S. ashevillena Ahearne et al. 2025
  - - S. aurantiaca
    - S. erecta
