= Social motility =

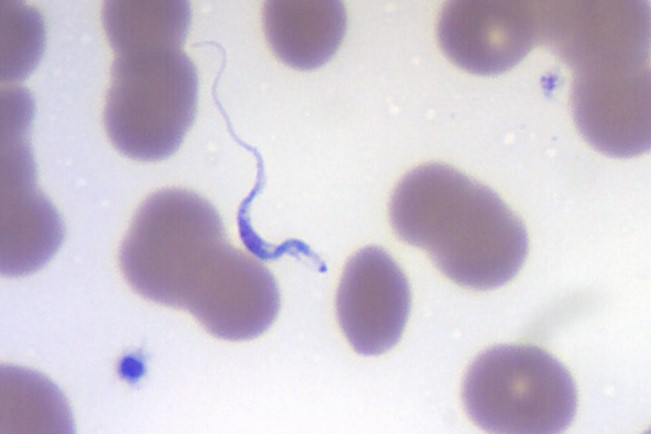
Social motility of African trypanosomiasis

Social motility describes the motile movement of groups of cells that communicate with each other to coordinate movement based on external stimuli. There are multiple varieties of each kingdom that express social motility that provides a unique evolutionary advantages that other species do not possess. This has made them lethal killers such as African trypanosomiasis, or Myxobacteria. These evolutionary advantages have proven to increase survival rate among socially motile bacteria whether it be the ability to evade predators or communication within a swarm to form spores for long term hibernation in times of low nutrients or toxic environments.

== Measuring bacterial motility ==
Motility assays can be utilized to quantitatively measure the macroscopic motility of a specimen. To perform a motility assay, semi-solid agar is inoculated with a small amount of a liquid suspension containing the specimen of interest. Over time, bacteria that are non-motile will remain near the initial inoculation site, while motile bacteria will spread along the media, forming a visible blur. The radius of the area of motility can be measured and compared between specimens, while the spatial patterns and spread of the visible area of motility can be altered by adding low concentrations of a known chemoattractant or chemorepellent to the medium. The motility of a species can also be measured microscopically, giving more insight into the movement of individual cells. Colonies can be examined under a microscope by using a thin layer of solidified nutrient media and a glass coverslip to create an interstitial interface at which active colony expansion can occur. This allows for the visualization of individual cells and the identification of different forms of bacterial motility present in a colony.

== Communication ==
Bacterial cells are able to communicate with one another through the use of chemical messengers. These chemical messengers are passed from one cell to the next to control factors such as virulence, growth and nutrient conditions, etc. As first discovered in plants, diffusible signal factors (DSFs) have been found in bacteria such as Burkholderia cenocepacia and Pseudomonas aeruginosa. When individual cells are stimulated by DSF, it causes them to release their own DSF to spread the signal further and also to generate a response to the DSF often seen as growth, movement, or sporulation in unfavorable growth conditions. Via these chemical messengers, swarms of bacteria are able to increase the rate of survival compared to single cell bacteria on their own.

== Benefits ==
=== Predation ===
Traveling in groups, often referred to as swarms, is beneficial to the organism. For instance, when Myxobacteria swarms and feeds on prey, all individual cells release hydrolytic enzymes. This abundance of metabolic enzymes allows the swarm to easily degrade and engulf the prey. Interactions between separate species of organisms in a given environment is very common. Production of toxins, usually in the form of antibodies, allows for cells to ward off other organisms from infringing on their niche. Similar to the combined release of degrading enzymes, antibodies allow for a colony of bacteria to fight off surrounding organisms in the same habitat.

=== Survival ===
Increased survival rates are seen in motile bacteria. This can be attributed to factors such as Chemotaxis, bacteria's ability to sense and migrate towards nutrients. The Chemotaxis mechanism can be amplified by social motility to alert all cells in the cluster of bacteria to move towards nutrients. The same is true of any toxic substances and the avoidance of that toxic environment by motile bacteria.

Phototaxis is a similar intracellular process to chemotaxis, and involves the directed movement of organisms in response to light. Prokaryotes are unable to sense the exact direction of light, but have still evolved mechanisms to sense and respond to the light-intensity gradient. Some halophilic archaebacteria, such as Halobacterium salinarum, use sensory rhodopsins as receptors for light and can help direct bacterial swims in areas with steep light gradients. This process is also present in eukaryotic organisms such as the green algae Chlamydomonas reinhardtii which using phototaxis to drive movement towards light to increase photosynthesis or away from areas of bright light to avoid damage to the molecular processes involved in photosynthesis.

=== Reproduction ===
Some organisms use social motility as a way to reproduce. One such organism is the slime mold Dictostelium discoideum, which forms a mobile "slug" via the aggregation of many individual amoebas. This process begins by one amoeba releasing a cyclic AMP (cAMP) signal during periods of stress, resulting in neighboring amoebas moving to this higher cAMP concentration through chemotaxis and releasing their own cAMP signals. The amoebas eventually aggregate into a single "slug," which responds to moisture and light gradients as it searches for a good place to form a reproductive stalk and produce spores.

== Examples ==
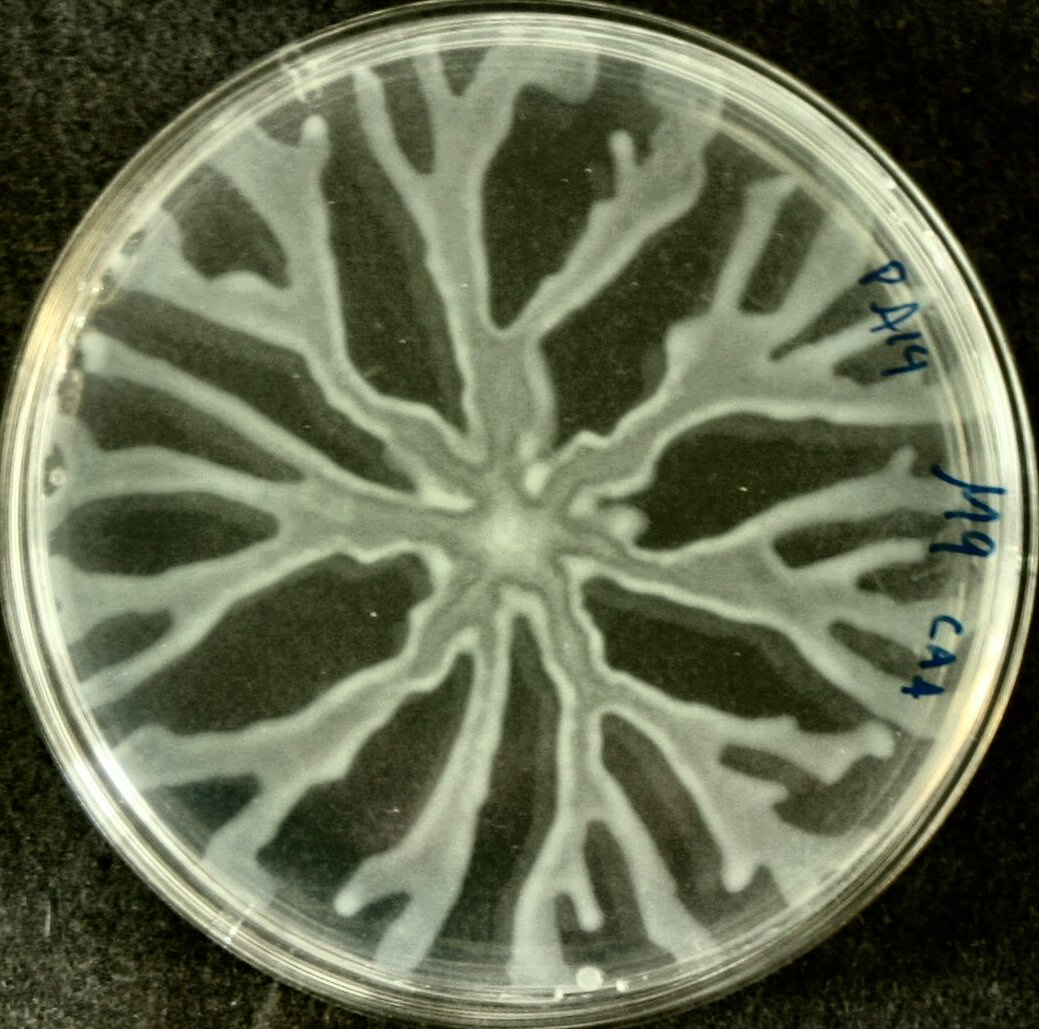
Swarming motility of Pseudomonas aeruginosa.

=== Swarming ===
Swarming motility is the coordinated movement of bacteria along a solid/semisolid surface. Swarming motility can usually be observed in a laboratory setting, depending on the conditions of media nutrient concentration, and the viscosity of the surface of the media.

=== Gliding ===
Example of Social Motility of Myxococcus xanthus.

Mechanisms that drive gliding motility are still unknown. However, despite lacking flagella, pili, and fimbriae, bacteria such as Myxococcus xanthus are able to move across surfaces in a gliding motion. Close studies of the myxococcus xanthus has proposed ideas of how the bacteria are able to move across surfaces. Inner membrane protein complexes, such as AgmU, propel the organism forward as these protein complexes function similar to the flagella complex of other motile organisms. These protein complexes, powered by a proton motive force, rotate within the membrane allowing cells to glide over surfaces.

=== Twitching ===
Built for use by many in the bacterial world, twitching motility is an important tool that bacteria use to move across moist surfaces. Twitching motility uses a type IV pili that extends, tethers to a surface, and then pulls the bacteria forward. This allows for quicker growth across biofilms and fruiting bodies. Type IV pili is run by over forty genes that regulate this type of motility. Myxococcus xanthus ability to use gliding motility to move is very similar to Pseudomonas aeruginosa twitching motility.^{[1]} Pseudomonas aeruginosa is a very motile bacteria species, but it has some drawbacks; in one experiment, a team of researchers discovered that if they put pressure on colonies that exhibited the quickest motility, it led to decreased production of biofilm formation but drastically increased rates of motility. They then compared their quickest strain to wild type species to see if there was a need for higher rates of motility in the environment, but none came close. Overall, increasing speeds did not increase the chance for survival in the long run.
