= Anaeromyxobacter =

Scientific classification
- Domain: Bacteria
- Kingdom: Pseudomonadati
- Phylum: Myxococcota
- Class: Myxococcia
- Order: Myxococcales
- Family: Anaeromyxobacteraceae; Yamamoto et al. 2014
- Genus: Anaeromyxobacter; Sanford et al. 2002

Type species
- Anaeromyxobacter dehalogenans Sanford et al. 2002

Genus of bacteria

Anaeromyxobacter is a genus in the phylum Myxococcota (Bacteria).

== Etymology ==
The name Anaeromyxobacter derives from: Greek prep. an, not or without; Greek noun aer, aeros (ἀήρ, ἀέρος), air; Greek noun muxa, mucus, slime; New Latin masculine gender noun , a rodbacter, nominally meaning "a rod", but in effect meaning a bacterium, rod; New Latin masculine gender noun Anaeromyxobacter, slime rod [living] without air.

== Species ==
The genus contains seven species:

- Anaeromyxobacter dehalogenans Sanford et al. 2002
- Anaeromyxobacter diazotrophicus Itoh et al. 2022
- Anaeromyxobacter oryzae Itoh et al. 2022
- Anaeromyxobacter oryzisoli Tang et al. 2024
- Anaeromyxobacter paludicola Itoh et al. 2022
- Anaeromyxobacter soli Tang et al. 2024
- Anaeromyxobacter terrae Tang et al. 2024
