= Centre for Genomic Research (Liverpool) =

English research institute

Coordinates: 53.40655°N 2.97557°W

The Centre for Genomic Research (CGR) (Liverpool) is located on the University of Liverpool Campus, and is funded by the Medical Research Council in and the Natural Environment Research Council (NERC). The goal of this research centre is to provide DNA sequencing and bioinformatics services to the scientific community.
