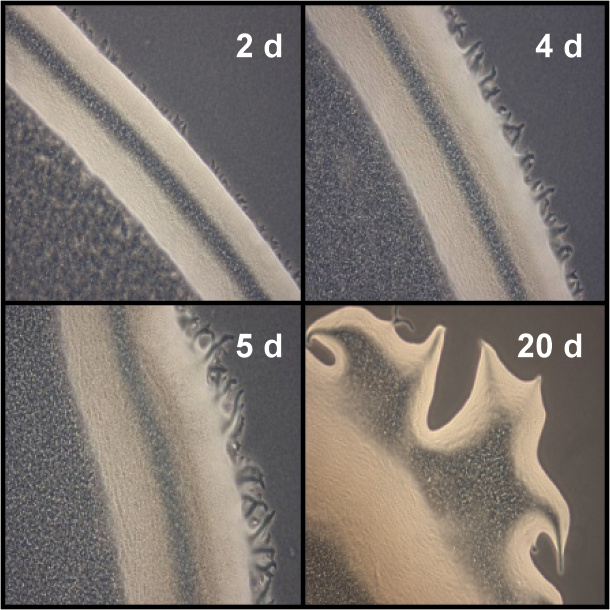
- Anaeromyxobacter dehalogenans enlarged and shows the myxobacteriums motility

Scientific classification
- Domain: Bacteria
- Kingdom: Pseudomonadati
- Phylum: Myxococcota
- Class: Myxococcia
- Order: Myxococcales
- Family: Anaeromyxobacteraceae
- Genus: Anaeromyxobacter
- Species: A. dehalogenans

Binomial name
- Anaeromyxobacter dehalogenans Sanford et al. 2002

= Anaeromyxobacter dehalogenans =

Species of bacterium

Anaeromyxobacter dehalogenans is a species of bacteria. It is an aryl-halorespiring facultative anaerobic myxobacterium. Its cells are slender, gram-negative rods with a bright red pigmentation that exhibit gliding motility and form spore-like structures. The type strain is 2CP-1 (ATCC BAA-258). Anaeromyxobacter dehalogenans have been found to grow under a minimal amount of electrons acceptors.

== Genomics ==
Anaeromyxobacter dehalogenans is part of the order Myxococcales and are the first anaerobes in this order. The suborder is between Cystobacterineae and the other two suborders, Sorangineae and Nannocystineae There is no other organism outside the delta-Proteobacteria that contributed more than 1.7% of the Anaeromyxobacter genome. A. dehalogenans does not have denitrification genes nirS and nirK, but does have narG, napA nrfA gene, and the nosZ gene. Because the bacterium lacks nirK and nirS and because of the reductional abilities A. dehalogenans does not qualify to be a denitrifier.

== Metabolism ==
The microbe has the ability to grow in 2,6-dichlorophenol, 2,5-dichlorophenol, 2-bromophenol, nitrate, fumarate, and oxygen.

Anaeromyxobacter dehalogenans can be found in a variety of different types of soils and sediments. Traits describing Anaeromyxobacter dehalogenans include reproduction via spores, aerobic, advanced signaling and fruiting body formation. The microbe grows by reducing Fe(III) to Fe(II). These abilities of reducing iron and lacking nirS and nirK are not strictly unique to A. dehalogenans. The acetate threshold for acetate in A. dehalogenans measured 69 ± 4, 19 ± 8, and <1 nM for chlororespiration, amorphous Fe(III) reduction, and Fe(III) citrate reduction. These concentrations allow for comparisons of metabolism in a single organism under different environmental conditions. The spores and fruiting body of these organisms are a response to unfavorable environments that the microbe may face, including low nutrient availability.
