= Sporangiole =

Specialized spore-producing organ in certain fungi

In mycology, a sporangiole is a specialised spherical sporangium produced by some species of fungi, smaller than or secondary to the typical sporangium.
