= Kofleriaceae =

Scientific classification
- Domain: Bacteria
- Kingdom: Pseudomonadati
- Phylum: Myxococcota
- Class: Myxococcia
- Order: Myxococcales
- Family: Kofleriaceae; Reichenbach 2007

Genera
- Haliangium; Kofleria

Synonyms
- Haliangiaceae Waite et al. 2020; "Haliangiaceae" Garrity et al. 2003

Family of bacteria

Kofleriaceae is an aerobic family of bacteria from the order Myxococcales.

== See also ==
- List of bacterial orders
- List of bacteria genera
