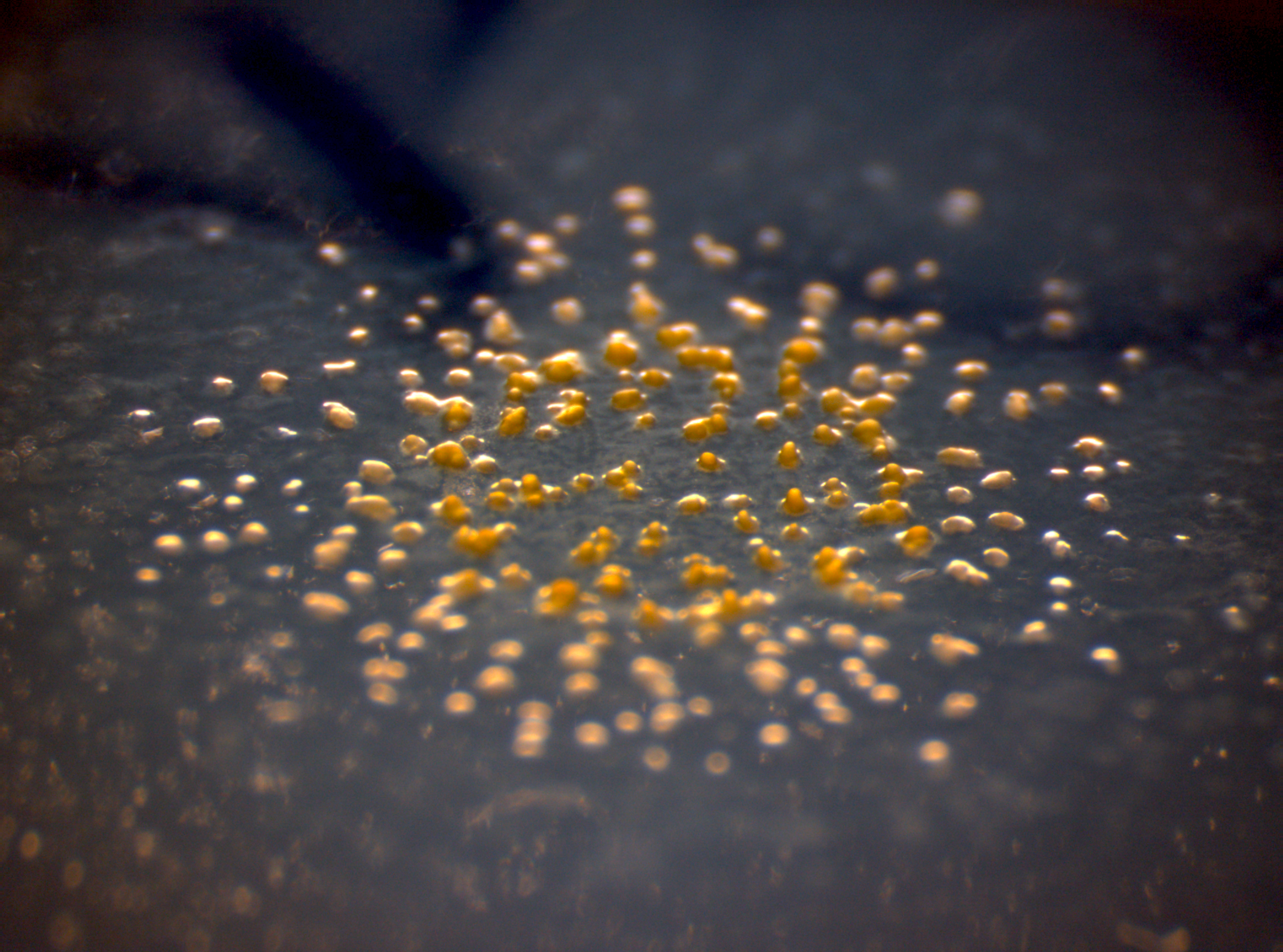
- Myxococcus xanthus

Scientific classification
- Domain: Bacteria
- Kingdom: Pseudomonadati
- Phylum: Myxococcota
- Class: Myxococcia
- Order: Myxococcales
- Family: Myxococcaceae; Jahn 1924

Genera
- See text

Synonyms
- Archangiaceae Jahn 1924; Cystobacteraceae McCurdy 1970

= Myxococcaceae =

Family of bacteria

Myxococcaceae is a family of gram-negative, rod-shaped bacteria. The family Myxococcaceae is encompassed within the myxobacteria ("slime bacteria"). The family is ubiquitously found in soils, marine, and freshwater environments. Production of compounds with medical uses by Myxococcaceae makes them useful in human health fields.

== Phylogeny ==
The currently accepted taxonomy is based on the List of Prokaryotic names with Standing in Nomenclature (LPSN) and National Center for Biotechnology Information (NCBI).

16S rRNA based LTP_10_2024

- - Stigmatella Berkeley & Curtis 1857 ex Berkeley & Curtis 1875
  - - Hyalangium Reichenbach 2007
    - - - Simulacricoccus Garcia & Muller 2018
        - Aggregicoccus Sood et al. 2015
      - - - - Angiococcus Jahn 1924 ex Hook, Larkin & Brockman 1980
            - - Archanigium Jahn et al. 1924
              - - Cystobacter gracilis Reichenbach 2013
                - Vitiosangium Awal et al. 2017
          - Cystobacter Schroeter 1886 [Melittangium Jahn 1924]
        - - - Citreicoccus Zhou et al. 2022
            - Corallococcus Reichenbach 2007
          - Myxococcus Thaxter 1892 [Pyxidicoccus corrig. Reichenbach 2007]

120 marker proteins based GTDB 10-RS226

- - - "Ca. Xihecaenimonas" Li et al. 2023 [JAEUJP01: GCA_016793725]
    - - "Ca. Xihelimnobacterium" Li et al. 2023 [FEN-1143: GCA_903911905]
      - "Ca. Xihemicrobium" Li et al. 2023 [JAEUJQ01]
  - - Aggregicoccus
    - - - Archanigium
        - - Melittangium
          - Cystobacter
      - - - Hyalangium rubrum corrig. Zang et al. 2024
          - - Hyalangium
            - Stigmatella
        - - - Citreicoccus
            - Corallococcus
          - Myxococcus [Pyxidicoccus]

== Morphology and behavior ==
Cells can be motile with gliding and swarming behavior. The vegetative cell shape in the Myxococcaceae family is long rods, which vary in size between members. The most common fruiting body morphs are soft hump and knob shaped with possible colors of yellow, peach, white, or orange depending on species. Myxococcaceae are spore producing bacteria and are delineated by their spore shape. The myxospores are oval to round and are optically refractive. Quorum sensing (QS) behavior is limited in this family. However, there is evidence that some members of the family produce molecules that interrupt the QS of other microbes, behavior potentially useful in predation.

== Relevance ==
Bacteria in the order of Myxococcales have led to scientific discoveries including the first genome to be sequenced, the primary observation of plasmid replication, and the first discovery of bacteriophage. Members of the Myxococcaceae produce a wide range of secondary metabolites having useful functions and applications. Compounds with anti-microbial, anti-parasitic, and in rare cases, anti-HIV activities have been isolated from the Myxococcaceae.
