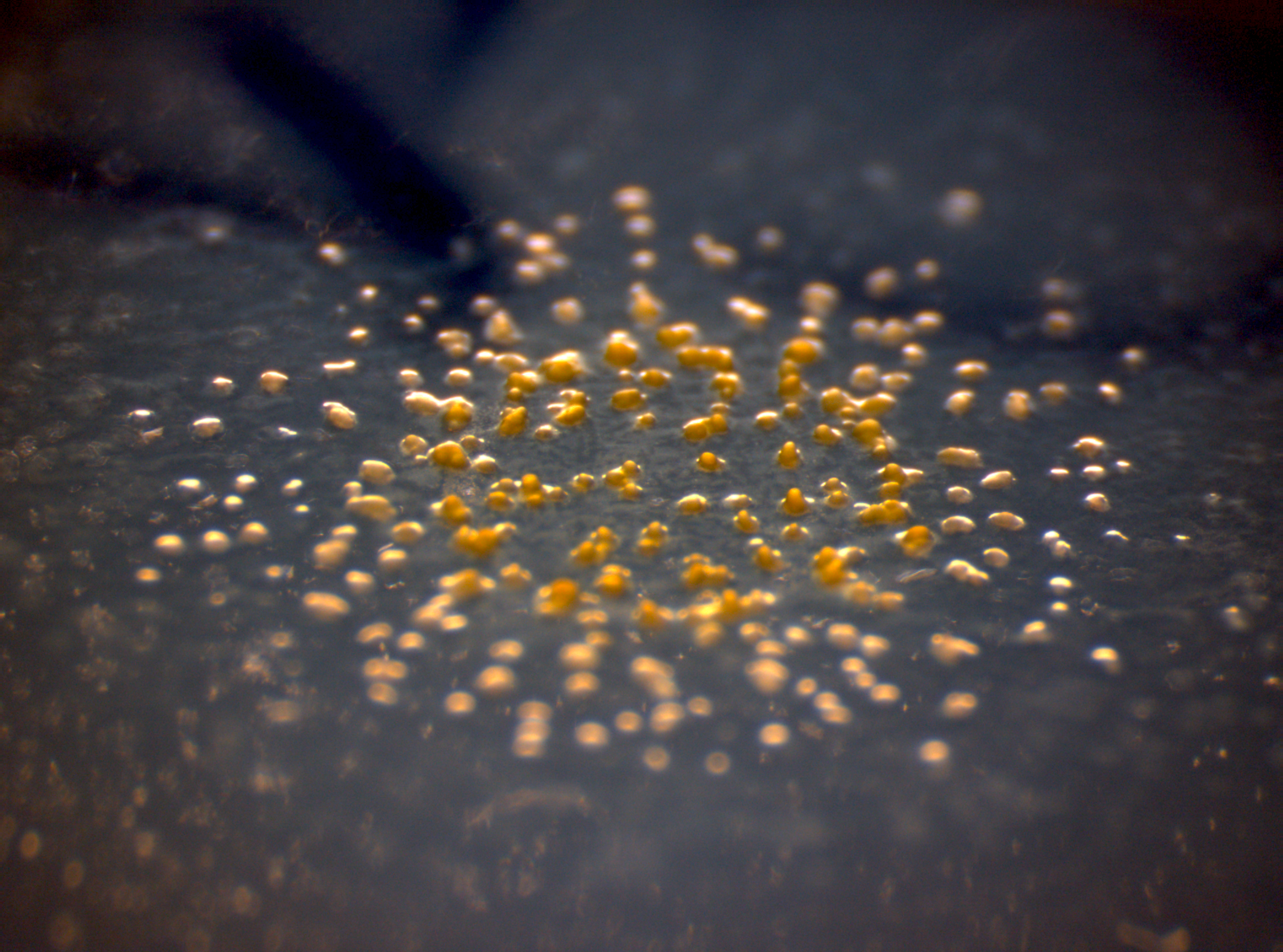

Scientific classification
- Domain: Bacteria
- Kingdom: Pseudomonadati
- Phylum: Myxococcota
- Class: Myxococcia
- Order: Myxococcales
- Family: Myxococcaceae
- Genus: Myxococcus
- Species: M. xanthus

Binomial name
- Myxococcus xanthus Beebe 1941

= Myxococcus xanthus =

Slime bacterium

Myxococcus xanthus is a gram-negative, bacillus (or rod-shaped) species of myxobacteria that is typically found in the top-most layer of soil. These bacteria lack flagella; rather, they use pili for motility. M. xanthus is well-known for its predatory behavior on other microorganisms. These bacteria source carbon from lipids rather than sugars. They exhibit various forms of self-organizing behavior in response to environmental cues. Under normal conditions with abundant food, they exist as predatory, saprophytic single-species biofilm called a swarm, highlighting the importance of intercellular communication for these bacteria. Under starvation conditions, they undergo a multicellular development cycle.

== Microbiology ==
=== Morphology ===
M. xanthus appear as gram-negative rods without flagella. These rods have an average length of 7 microns and width of 0.5 microns. It utilizes type IV pili (T4P) to move in a "gliding" manner, crawling along a surface. As a colony or swarm, M. xanthus appear as a thin layer of ripples, often moving toward prey. In its spore form, the bacterium becomes a sphere with a thick outer membrane. This spore is yellow-orange, giving M. xanthus its name (xanthós, Ancient Greek meaning "golden").

=== Environment ===
M. xanthus is typically found in the top most layer of soil, preying as a "pack" on other microorganisms like bacteria or fungi. It is a neutralophile, growing best between a pH of 7.2-8.2. The bacteria are mesophiles, growing best within the temperature range of 34-36 °C. Like other Myxococcus bacteria, it is an obligate aerobe, meaning it requires oxygen for aerobic respiration to maintain cellular functions.

=== Metabolism ===
M. xanthus is a chemoorganoheterotroph. It obtains energy from oxidation-reduction reactions and obtains both electrons and carbon from organic molecules. These bacteria do produce and consume glycogen, a branched glucose polymer, but cannot fully convert glucose to pyruvate though the Embden-Meyerhof-Parnas pathway. The flux through the pathway is incomplete, even though homologs of each enzyme are present in the genome. Because of this reason, M. xanthus cannot rely on sugars for growth. It is hypothesized that the incomplete glycolytic pathway produces substrates needed for lipid metabolism.

M. xanthus relies on lipid metabolism to source carbon. The bacteria demonstrate a diverse set of lipid reactions, especially in lipid anabolism. They produce ether lipids, which are commonly associated with eukaryotes rather than prokaryotes. In these reactions, phospholipids are broken down into the polar head group, glycerol, and the two fatty acids. The fatty acids are degraded through β-oxidation at the carboxyl end of the fatty acid. M. xanthus expresses a wide variety of fatty acids. Cells contain at least 18 different fatty acids, compared to the 3 to 5 fatty acids seen in most Proteobacteria. Redundancy in the fatty acid elongation enzymes and desaturase enzymes may contribute to this diversity of fatty acids.

M. xanthus salvages purines and pyrimidines from its prey to produce nucleic acids. Amino acids are treated similarly, with the majority undergoing further catalysis for use in other pathways as needed.

=== Evolution ===
The evolution of M. xanthus unique ability to collectively gather and assemble into a stalk-like structure, termed a fruiting body, can largely be attributed to two mechanisms of gene transfer such as lateral gene transfer (LGT) and vertical gene transfer. For myxobacteria, LGT suggests acquisition of genes comes from other species of bacteria and is supported with the fact that the trait of M. xanthus' fruiting body is not possible without genes from other bacterial sources. LGT has shown to be responsible for the expansion of the genome by at least 1.4 Mb. Very little is known about the evolutionary mechanisms present in M. xanthus. However, it has been discovered that it can establish a generalist predator relationship with different prey, among which is Escherichia coli. In this predator-prey relationship, a parallel evolution of both species is observed through genomic and phenotypic modifications, producing in subsequent generations a better adaptation of one of the species that is counteracted by the evolution of the other, following a co-evolutionary model known as the Red Queen hypothesis. However, the evolutionary mechanisms present in M. xanthus that produce this parallel evolution are still unknown.

In 2003, two scientists, Velicer and Yu, deleted certain parts of the M. xanthus genome. This deletion made cells unable to swarm effectively on soft agar. Isolated colonies were cloned and allowed to evolve. After a period of 64 weeks, two of the evolving populations had started to swarm outward almost as effectively as normal wild-type colonies. However, the patterns of the swarm were very different from those of the wild-type bacteria. This suggested that the cells had developed a new way of moving, and Velicer and Yu confirmed this by showing that the new populations had not regained the ability to make pili. This study addressed questions about the evolution of cooperation between individual cells that had plagued scientists for years.

=== Genetics ===
The genome of M. xanthus consists of one circular chromosome with one origin of replication and no plasmids. In 2001, the genome of strain DK1622 was determined to have 9.14 Mb. The genome size is considerably larger than other Proteobacteria, likely due to lineage-specific gene duplication. Over 90% of the genome contains genes that encode for proteins.

In 2023, the R31 isolate of M. xanthus underwent whole genome sequencing amounting to 9.25Mb. The R31 isolate's genome codes for roughly 55% core proteins, 25% accessory proteins, 13% specific proteins, and 10% proteins that are specific to the isolate. Strain-specific genes likely relate to the evolutionary and predatory aspects that are not found in other strains. Within the R31 genome, 18 distinct genomic islands and 11 prophages were found. Genomic islands were incorporated into the M. xanthus genome through horizontal gene transfer, thus altering the adaptability of the bacteria.

==== Strains ====
- Myxococcus xanthus DK1622
- Myxococcus xanthus DZ2 v2
- Myxococcus xanthus DZ2 v1
- Myxococcus xanthus DZF1
- Myxococcus xanthus NewJersey2
- Myxococcus xanthus DSM16,526^{T}
- Myxococcus xanthus R31
- Myxococcus xanthus KF4.3.9c1
- Myxococcus xanthus ATCC 27,925
- Myxococcus xanthus GH3.5.6c2
- Myxococcus xanthus MC3.5.9c15
- Myxococcus xanthus MC3.3.5c16
- Myxococcus xanthus GH5.1.9c20
- Myxococcus xanthus KF3.2.8c11
- Myxococcus xanthus DK1622pDPO
- Myxococcus xanthus AB023
- Myxococcus xanthus AM005
- Myxococcus xanthus CA029
- Myxococcus xanthus AM003

Whole genome comparisons have indicated that M. virescens is the same species as M. xanthus. M. virescens was first described in 1892, so has precedence.

== Complex behaviors ==
=== Collective behavior ===
A swarm of M. xanthus is a distributed system containing millions of bacteria that communicate among themselves in a non-centralized fashion. Simple patterns of cooperative behavior among the members of the colony combine to generate complex group behaviors in a process known as "stigmergy". For example, the tendency for one cell to glide only when in direct contact with another results in the colony forming swarms called "wolf-packs" that may measure up to several inches wide. This behavior is advantageous to the members of the swarm, as it increases the concentration of extracellular digestive enzymes secreted by the bacteria, thus facilitating predatory feeding. M. xanthus feeds on dead biomass of a broad range of bacteria and some fungi, discriminating living cells from dead cells and causing cell death and lysis when required.

During stressful conditions, the bacteria undergo a process in which about 100,000 individual cells aggregate to form a structure called the fruiting body over the course of approximately twenty-four hours. The start of this process involves the cells displaying low motility. After several hours, the cells suddenly undergo a fast period of motion in which cells form "streams" to increase cell density and begin forming layers to develop the fruiting body. On the interior of the fruiting body, the rod-shaped cells are differentiated into spherical, thick-walled spores. They undergo changes in the synthesis of new proteins, as well as alterations in the cell wall, which parallel the morphological changes. During these aggregations, dense ridges of cells move in ripples, which wax and wane over 5 hours.

=== Motility ===
Social motility leads to a spatial distribution of cells with many clusters and few isolated single cells.

M. xanthus exhibits two main types of motility, known as A-motility and S-motility. A-motility (adventurous), otherwise known as "gliding," is a method of locomotion that allows for forward movement on single cells, without the help of flagella, on a solid surface. There are more than 37 genes involved in the A-motility system. This form of motility is facilitated by Glt complexes in the cell envelope of the cell, which is powered using a molecular motor called an Agl. The molecular motors in M. xanthus are driven by the H^{+} ion gradient. Each bacterial cell has an array of motors along the cell body, which are localized to the periplasmic space in the cell envelope but bound to the peptidoglycan layer in the cell wall. The motors are hypothesized to move on helical cytoskeletal filaments.

The combination of the Glt complexes with the Agl motor allows for focal adhesion and move freely in the outer membrane, and provide contact with the substratum. Extracellular polysaccharide slime assists with the gliding movement across a surface. These bacteria are limited to forward movement and contains a lagging pole on the end, which opposes the motion.

M. xanthus has the ability to use a second type of motility. This motility is called social motility (S-motility), in which single cells do not move, but rather cells that are closer together move. This leads to a spatial distribution of cells with many clusters and few isolated single cells. This motility depends on the presence of the type IV pili. and diverse polysaccharides.

S-motility may represent a variation of twitching motility since it is mediated by the extension and retraction of type IV pili that extend through the leading cell pole. The genes of the S-motility system appear to be homologs of genes involved in the biosynthesis, assembly, and function of twitching motility in other bacteria.

=== Cell differentiation, fruiting and sporulation ===
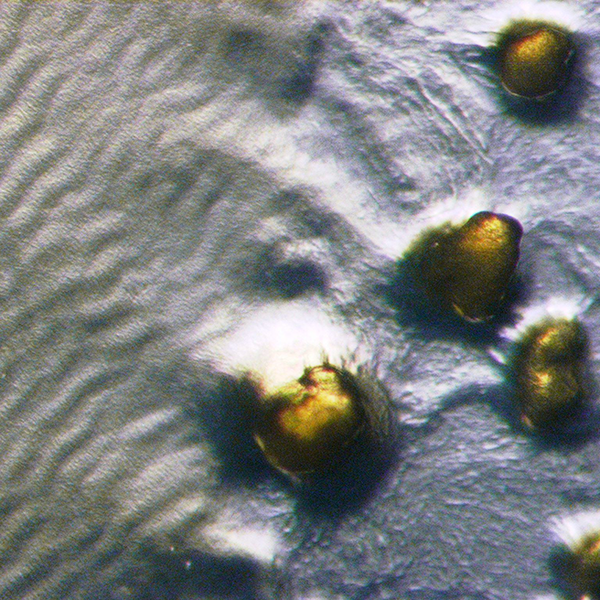
In the presence of prey (here E. coli), M. xanthus cells self-organize into periodic bands of traveling waves, termed ripples (left-hand side). In the areas without prey, M. xanthus cells are under nutrient stress and as a result self-organize into haystack-shaped, spore-filled structures termed fruiting bodies (right-hand side, yellow mounds).

In response to starvation cells direct their resources to develop species-specific multicellular fruiting bodies that are capable of aiding in social cooperation for predation. Starting from a uniform swarm of cells, some aggregate into fruiting bodies, while other cells remain in a vegetative state. Those cells that participate in the formation of the fruiting body transform from rods into spherical, heat-resistant myxospores, while the peripheral cells remain rod-shaped. Although they are not as tolerant to environmental extremes as Bacillus endospores, the relative resistance of myxospores to desiccation and freezing enables myxobacteria to survive seasonally harsh environments. When a nutrient source becomes once again available, the myxospores germinate, shedding their spore coats to emerge into rod-shaped vegetative cells. The synchronized germination of thousands of myxospores from a single fruiting body enables the members of the new colony of myxobacteria to immediately engage in cooperative feeding.

M. xanthus cells can also differentiate into environmentally-resistant spores in a starvation-independent manner. This process, known as chemically induced sporulation, is triggered by the presence of glycerol and other chemical compounds at high concentrations. The biological implications of this sporulation process have been controversial for decades due to the unlikeliness of finding such high concentrations of chemical inducers in their natural environment. However, the finding that the antifungal compound ambruticin acts as a potent natural inducer at concentrations expected to be present in soil, suggests that chemically induced sporulation is the result of competition and communication with the ambruticin-producing myxobacterium Sorangium cellulosum.

=== Sensing environmental signals ===
==== Ability to eavesdrop ====
It has been shown that an M. xanthus swarm is capable of eavesdropping on the extracellular signals that are produced by the bacteria it preys upon, leading to changes in swarm behavior and increasing its efficiency as a predator. In the presence of acyl homoserine lactones, which are the signals produced by prey intended for other prey, M. xanthus transforms toward more vegetative predatory cells instead of myxospores. This allows for highly adaptive physiology that will have likely contributed to the near ubiquitous distribution of the myxobacteria. These bacteria also respond to a chemoattractant called phosphatidylethanolamine, which is expelled when the prey dies. The chemoattractant draws in more M. xanthus, allowing for total lysis of prey cells. In order for M. xanthus to eavesdrop, there needs to be a high concentration of signals emitting between prey, which can occur when phosphatidylethanolamine is released, thus attracting more prey.

==== Intercellular communication ====
It is very likely that cells communicate during the process of fruiting and sporulation because a starving group of cells forms myxospores within fruiting bodies. Intercellular signaling appears to be necessary to ensure that sporulation happens in the proper place and at the proper time. Research supports the existence of an extracellular signal, A-factor, which is necessary for developmental gene expression and for the development of a complete fruiting body. This signaling mechanism is additionally capable of measuring the size of the surrounding aggregates.

==== Developmental cheating ====
Social cheating exists among M. xanthus commonly. As long as mutants are not common and they are unable to perform the group beneficial function of producing spores, they will still reap the benefit of the population as a whole. Research has shown that four different types of M. xanthus mutants showed forms of cheating during development by being over-represented among spores relative to their initial frequency in the mixture.

== Importance in research ==
The complex life cycles of the myxobacteria make them attractive models for the study of gene regulation as well as cell to cell interactions. The traits of M. xanthus make them easy to study and, therefore, important to research. Laboratory strains of M. xanthus are available that are capable of planktonic growth in shaker culture, making them easy to grow in large numbers. The tools of classical and molecular genetics are relatively well-developed in M. xanthus.

Although the fruiting bodies of M. xanthus are relatively primitive compared with the elaborate structures produced by Stigmatella aurantiaca and other myxobacteria, the great majority of genes known to be involved in development are conserved across species. In order to make agar cultures of M. xanthus grow into fruiting bodies, one simply can plate the bacteria on starvation media. It is possible to artificially induce the production of myxospores without the intervening formation of fruiting bodies by adding compounds such as glycerol or various metabolites to the medium. In this way, different stages in the developmental cycle can be experimentally isolated.
