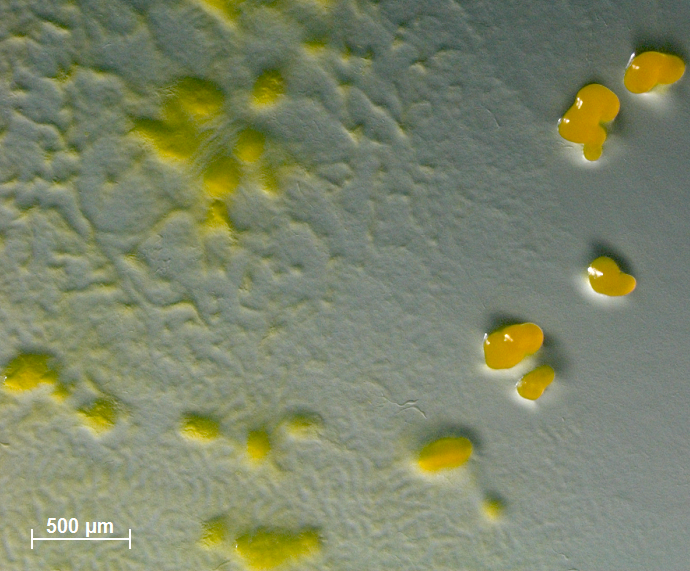

Scientific classification
- Domain: Bacteria
- Kingdom: Pseudomonadati
- Phylum: Myxococcota; Waite et al. 2021

Classes
- Bradymonadia; "Kuafubacteriia"; Myxococcia; Polyangiia

Synonyms
- Deltabacteria Cavalier-Smith 2002; Deltaproteobacteria Kuever et al. 2006; "Myxococcia" Cavalier-Smith 2020; "Myxococcota" Waite et al. 2020

= Myxococcota =

Phylum of bacteria

The Myxococcota are a phylum of bacteria known as the fruiting gliding bacteria. All species of this group are Gram-negative. They are predominantly aerobic genera that release myxospores in unfavorable environments.

== Phylogeny ==
The currently accepted taxonomy is based on the List of Prokaryotic names with Standing in Nomenclature (LPSN) and National Center for Biotechnology Information (NCBI).

120 conserved single-copy marker and rRNA genes

- - Myxococcia
    - Myxococcales
      - Anaeromyxobacteraceae
      - - Vulgatibacteraceae
        - Myxococcaceae
  - Polyangiia
    - - Nannocystales
        Nannocystaceae
      - Haliangiales
        Kofleriaceae
    - - Polyangiales
        - Sandaracinaceae
        - Polyangiaceae

16S rRNA based LTP_10_2024

- Bradymonadia Bradymonadales
  - - Microvenatoraceae
    - Bradymonadaceae
  - Lujinxingiaceae

- Myxococcia Myxococcales
  - Anaeromyxobacteraceae
  - - Vulgatibacteraceae
    - Myxococcaceae

- Polyangiia
  - - Haliangiales
      Haliangiaceae [incl. Kofleriaceae]
    - Nannocystales
      Nannocystaceae
  - - Polyangiales
      - Sandaracinaceae
      - Polyangiaceae

120 marker proteins based GTDB 10-RS226

- - - "Kuafubacteriia"
      - "Kuafubacteriales"
        "Kuafubacteriaceae" [WYAZ01]
    - Myxococcia
      - Myxococcales
        - - Vulgatibacteraceae
          - Anaeromyxobacteraceae
        - Myxococcaceae
  - - Bradymonadia
      - Bradymonadales
        Bradymonadaceae [incl. Lujinxingiaceae; Microvenatoraceae]
    - Polyangiia
      - - Haliangiales
          Haliangiaceae
        - Nannocystales
          Nannocystaceae
      - - Polyangiales
          - - "Houyibacteriaceae" [SG8-38]
            - Sandaracinaceae
          - Polyangiaceae

== See also ==
- List of bacterial orders
- List of bacteria genera
- Bacterial taxonomy
