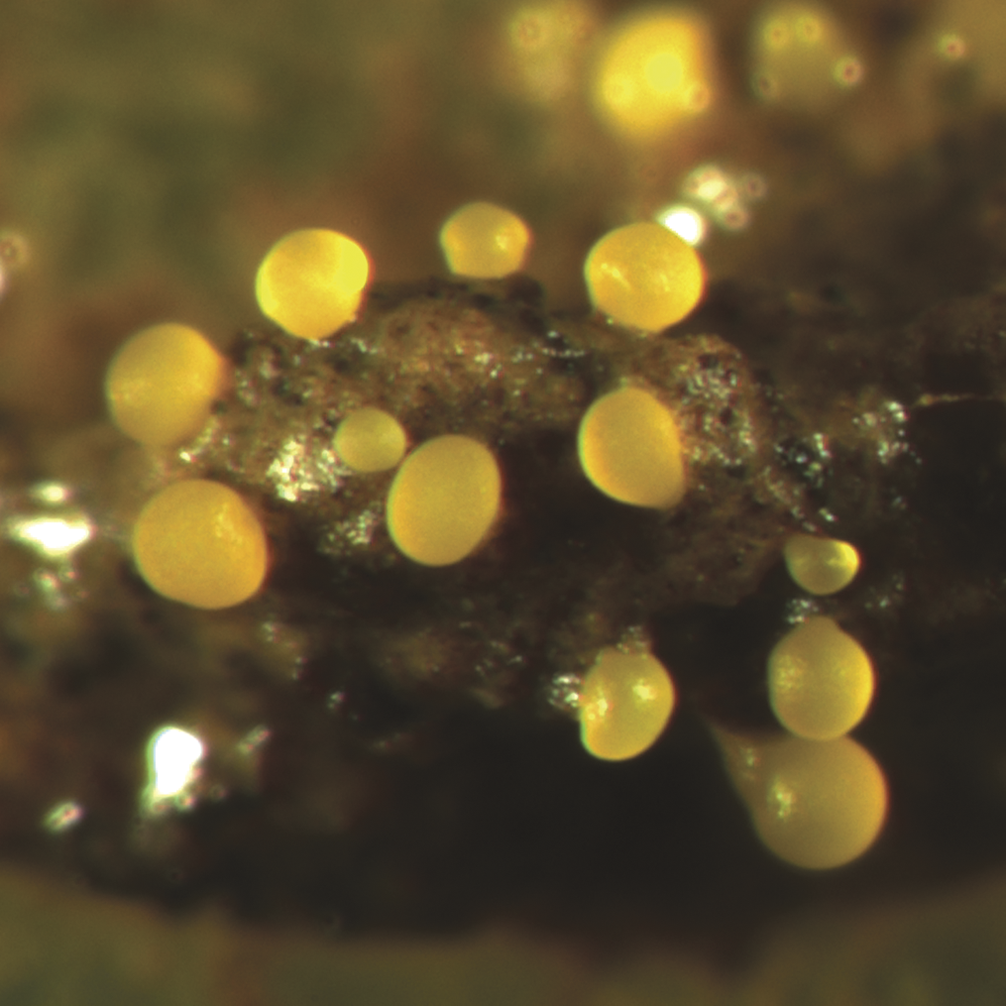
- Myxococcus xanthus

Scientific classification
- Domain: Bacteria
- Kingdom: Pseudomonadati
- Phylum: Myxococcota
- Class: Myxococcia; Waite et al. 2020
- Order: Myxococcales; Tchan et al. 1948

Families & genera
- Anaeromyxobacteraceae; Myxococcaceae; Vulgatibacteraceae

Synonyms
- "Myxococcia" Oren, Parte & Garrity 2016; "Myxococcidae" Cavalier-Smith 2020; "Myxoschizomycetes"

= Myxobacteria =

Order of bacteria

The myxobacteria ("slime bacteria") are a group of bacteria that predominantly live in the soil and feed on insoluble organic substances. The myxobacteria have very large genomes relative to other bacteria, e.g. 9–10 million nucleotides except for Anaeromyxobacter and Vulgatibacter. One species of myxobacteria, Minicystis rosea, has the largest known bacterial genome with over 16 million nucleotides. The second largest is another myxobacteria Sorangium cellulosum.

Myxobacteria can move by gliding. They typically travel in swarms (also known as wolf packs), containing many cells kept together by intercellular molecular signals. Individuals benefit from aggregation as it allows accumulation of the extracellular enzymes that are used to digest food; this in turn increases feeding efficiency. Myxobacteria produce a number of biomedically and industrially useful chemicals, such as antibiotics, and export those chemicals outside the cell.

Myxobacteria are used to study the polysaccharide production in gram-negative bacteria like the model Myxococcus xanthus which have four different mechanisms of polysaccharide secretion and where a new Wzx/Wzy mechanism producing a new polysaccharide was identified in 2020.

Myxobacteria are also good models to study multicellularity in the bacterial world.

== Life cycle ==
When nutrients are scarce, myxobacterial cells aggregate into fruiting bodies (not to be confused with those in fungi), a process long-thought to be mediated by chemotaxis but now considered to be a function of a form of contact-mediated signaling. These fruiting bodies can take different shapes and colors, depending on the species. Within the fruiting bodies, cells begin as rod-shaped vegetative cells, and develop into rounded myxospores with thick cell walls. These myxospores, analogous to spores in other organisms, are more likely to survive until nutrients are more plentiful. The fruiting process is thought to benefit myxobacteria by ensuring that cell growth is resumed with a group (swarm) of myxobacteria, rather than as isolated cells. Similar life cycles have developed among certain amoebae, called cellular slime molds.

At a molecular level, initiation of fruiting body development in Myxococcus xanthus is regulated by Pxr sRNA.

Myxobacteria such as Myxococcus xanthus and Stigmatella aurantiaca are used as model organisms for the study of development.

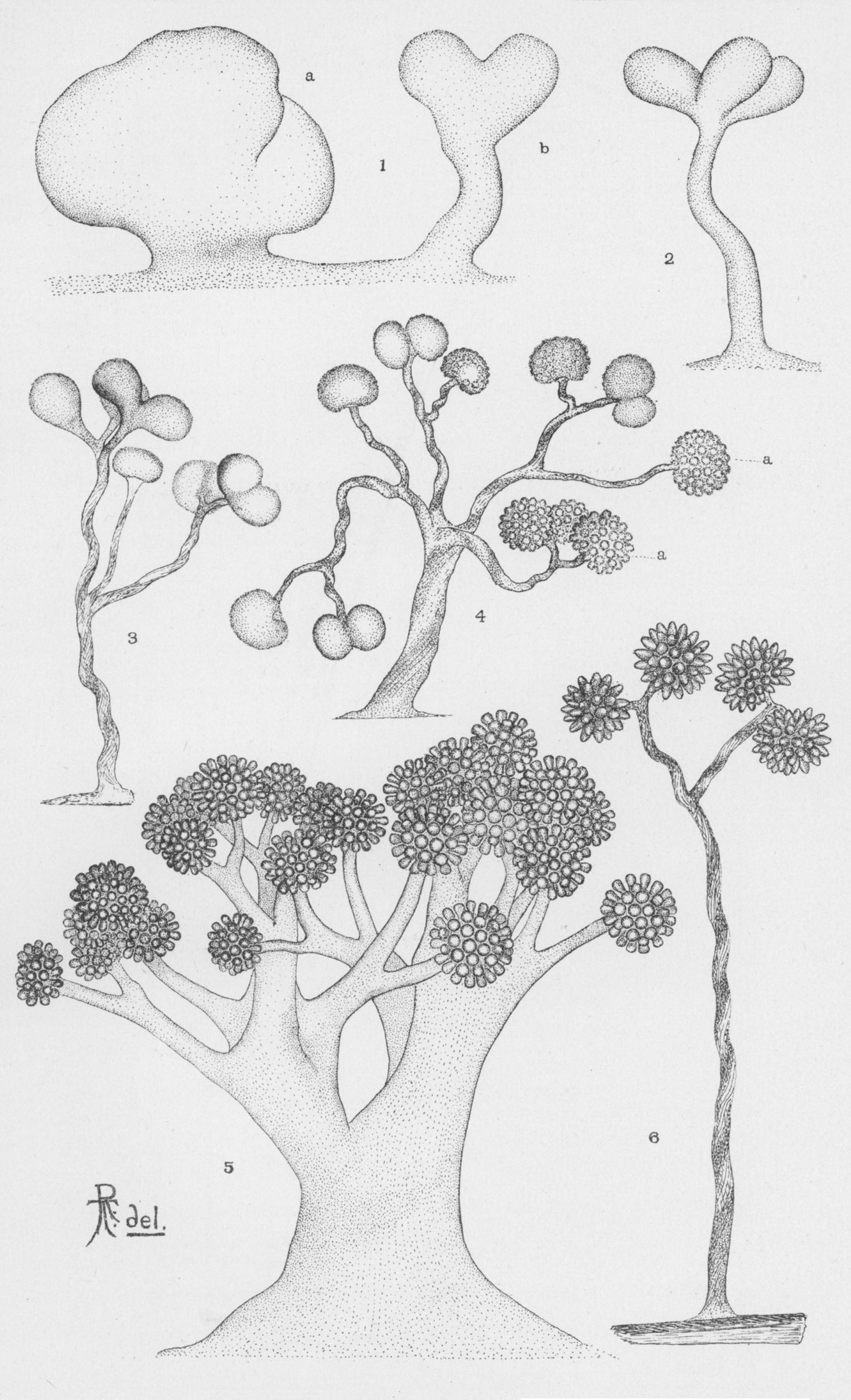
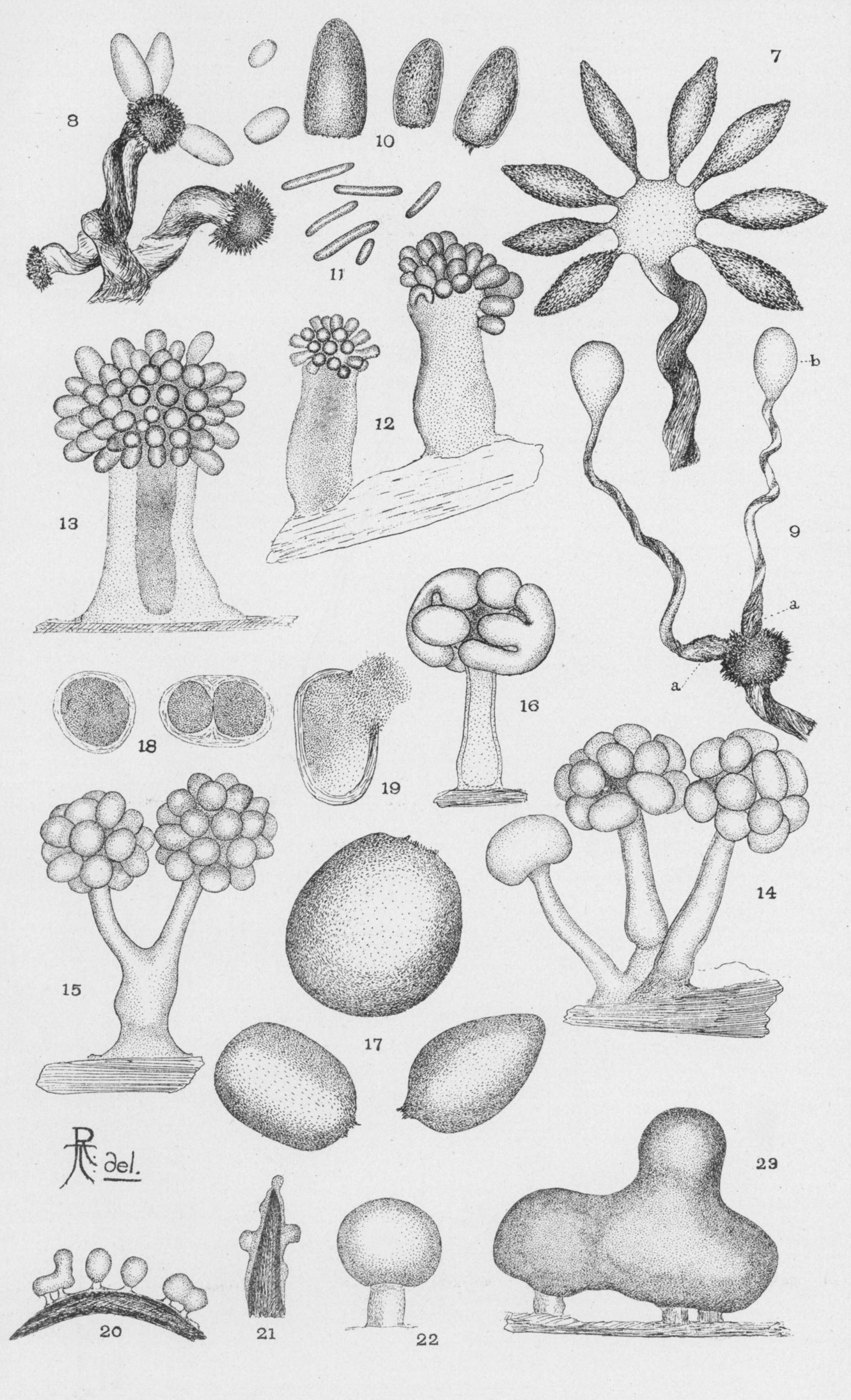
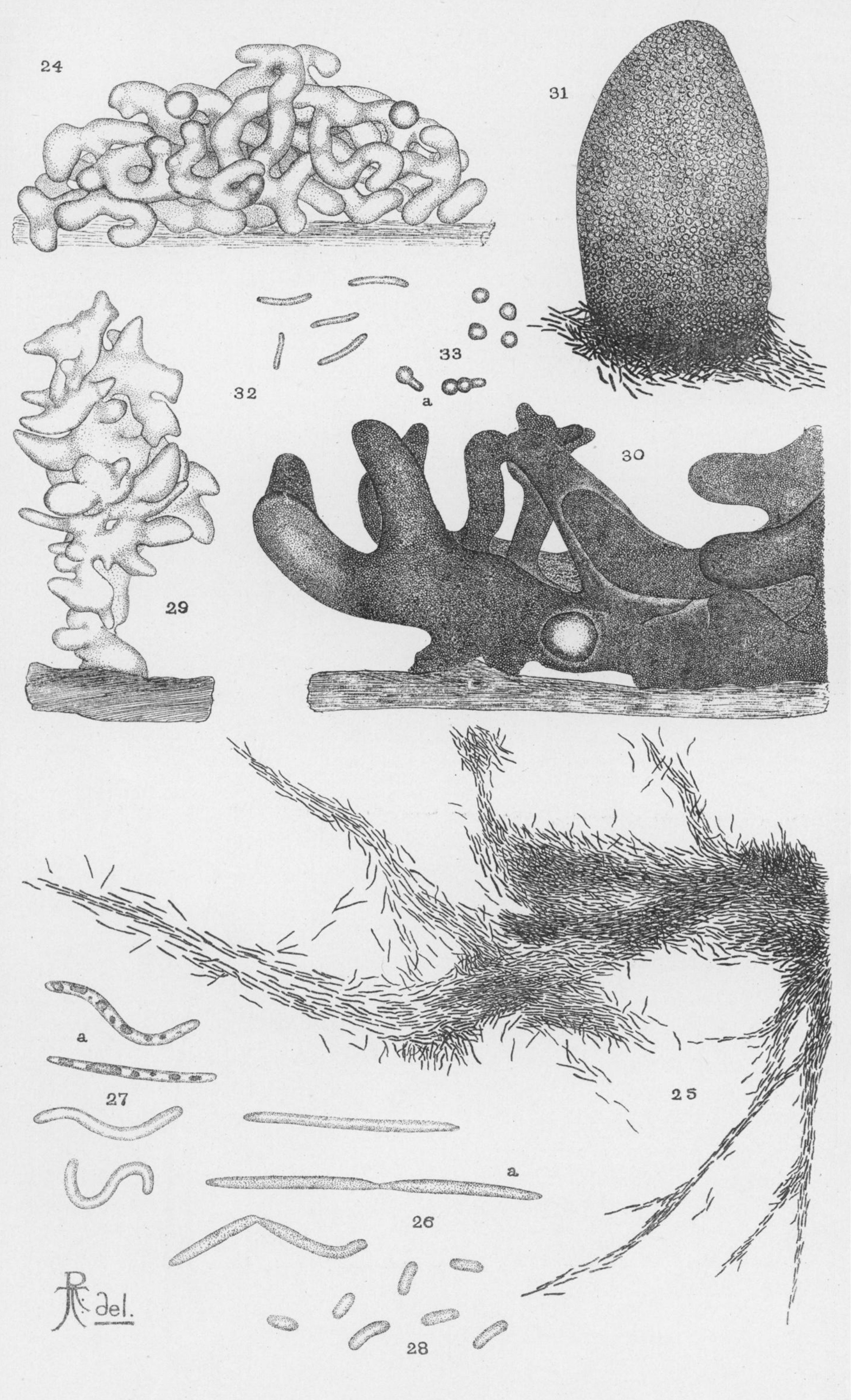
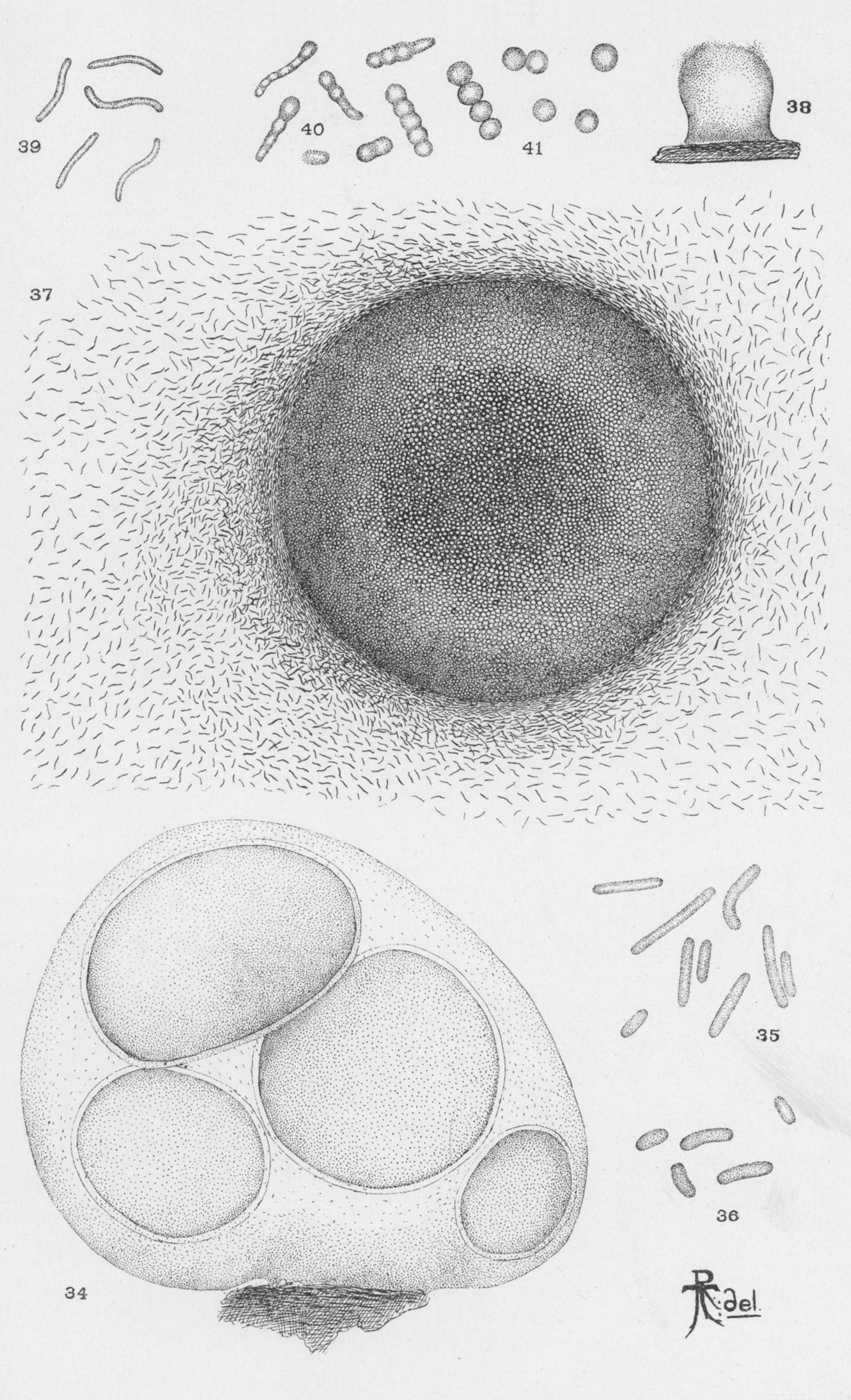
Various myxobacterial species as sketched by Roland Thaxter in 1892: Chondromyces crocatus (figs. 1–11), Stigmatella aurantiaca (figs. 12–19 and 25-28), Melittangium lichenicola (figs. 20–23), Archangium gephyra (fig. 24), Myxococcus coralloides (figs. 29-33), Polyangium vitellinum (figs. 34-36), and Myxococcus fulvus (figs. 37-41). Thaxter was the first taxonomist to recognize the bacterial nature of the myxobacteria. Previously, they had been misclassified as members of the fungi imperfecti.

It has been suggested that the last common ancestor of myxobacteria was an aerobe and that their anaerobic predecessors lived syntrophically with early eukaryotes.

== Clinical use ==
Metabolites secreted by Sorangium cellulosum known as epothilones have been noted to have antineoplastic activity. This has led to the development of analogs which mimic its activity. One such analog, known as Ixabepilone is a U.S. Food and Drug Administration approved chemotherapy agent for the treatment of metastatic breast cancer.

Myxobacteria are also known to produce gephyronic acid, an inhibitor of eukaryotic protein synthesis and a potential agent for cancer chemotherapy.

== Phylogeny ==
The currently accepted taxonomy is based on the List of Prokaryotic names with Standing in Nomenclature (LPSN) and National Center for Biotechnology Information (NCBI).

16S rRNA based LTP_10_2024

- Bradymonadia Bradymonadales
  - - Microvenatoraceae Wang, Chen & Du 2022
    - Bradymonadaceae Wang et al. 2015
  - Lujinxingiaceae Wang, Chen & Du 2022

- Myxococcia Myxococcales
  - Anaeromyxobacteraceae Yamamoto et al. 2014
  - - Vulgatibacteraceae Yamamoto et al. 2014
    - Myxococcaceae Jahn 1924

- Polyangiia
  - - Haliangiales
      Kofleriaceae Reichenbach 2007
      [incl. Haliangiaceae]
    - Nannocystales
      Nannocystaceae Reichenbach 2006
  - - Polyangiales
      - Sandaracinaceae Mohr et al. 2012
      - Polyangiaceae Jahn 1924

120 marker proteins based GTDB 10-RS226

- - - "Kuafubacteriia"
      - "Kuafubacteriales"
        "Kuafubacteriaceae" [WYAZ01]
    - Myxococcia
      - Myxococcales
        - - Vulgatibacteraceae
          - Anaeromyxobacteraceae
        - Myxococcaceae
  - - Bradymonadia
      - Bradymonadales
        Bradymonadaceae [incl. Lujinxingiaceae; Microvenatoraceae]
    - Polyangiia
      - - Haliangiales
          Haliangiaceae
        - Nannocystales
          Nannocystaceae
      - - Polyangiales
          - - "Houyibacteriaceae" [SG8-38]
            - Sandaracinaceae
          - Polyangiaceae

== See also ==
- List of bacterial orders
- List of bacteria genera
