= PomB =

PomB is a protein that is part of the stator in Na^{+} driven bacterial flagella. Na influx to torque generation in the polar flagellar motor of Vibrio alginolyticus. The stator complex is fixed-anchored around the rotor through a putative peptidoglycan-binding (PGB) domain in the periplasmic region of PomB.

== See also ==
- MotB - MotA and MotB make the stator
- MotA - MotA and MotB make the stator
- PomA - protein that is part of the stator in Na+
- Integral membrane protein a type of membrane protein
- Archaellum
- Cilium
- Ciliopathy
- Rotating locomotion in living systems
- Undulipodium
