= Motility protein A =

Identifiers
- Organism: Escherichia coli str. K-12
- Symbol: motA
- Alt. symbols: ECK1891; flaJ; JW1879
- Entrez: 947564
- Orthologs: NCBI: entry; OMA: entry
- RefSeq (Prot): NP_416404.1
- UniProt: P09348

Other data
- Chromosome: chromosome: 1.97 - 1.98 Mb
Search for
- Structures: Swiss-model
- Domains: InterPro

Motility protein A (MotA), is a bacterial protein that is encoded by the motA gene. It is a component of the flagellar motor. More specifically, MotA and MotB make the stator of a H^{+} driven bacterial flagella and surround the rotor as a ring of about 8–10 particles. MotA and MotB are integral membrane proteins. MotA has four transmembrane domains.

Both proteins are part of the H^{+} channel that makes possible the flux of protons and the motor's rotation.

In MotA mutants, the motor function is re-established if the MotA protein is expressed.

Though MotA and MotB are part of the proteins required for H^{+} mediated flagellar motility, they show a high degree of homology to the PomA and PomB proteins present in bacterial species utilizing Na^{+} ion fluxes to power flagella and studies have revealed that a 'pomA' mutant of Vibrio alginolyticus can regain motility by expression of MotA. As restoring motility of pomA mutants by heterologous expression of MotA does not change the ion used to power the flagellum of the transgenic Vibrio alginolyticus, MotA is not in itself an essential specificity factor in ion selectivity, though that does not exclude it being partially involved in determining ion specificity of the flagellar complex.

== See also ==
- MotB - MotA and MotB make the stator
- PomA - protein that is part of the stator in Na+
- PomB - protein that is part of the stator in Na+
- Integral membrane protein a type of membrane protein
- Archaellum
- Cilium
- Ciliopathy
- Rotating locomotion in living systems
- Undulipodium
