= PomA =

PomA is a protein that is part of the stator in Na^{+} driven bacterial flagella. It has a high degree of homology to MotA, and Rhodobacter sphaeroides MotA can functionally complement a non-motile Vibrio alginolyticus with a non-functional pomA gene.

== See also ==
- MotB - MotA and MotB make the stator
- MotA - MotA and MotB make the stator
- PomB - protein that is part of the stator in Na+
- Integral membrane protein a type of membrane protein
- Archaellum
- Cilium
- Ciliopathy
- Rotating locomotion in living systems
- Undulipodium
