= Motility protein B =

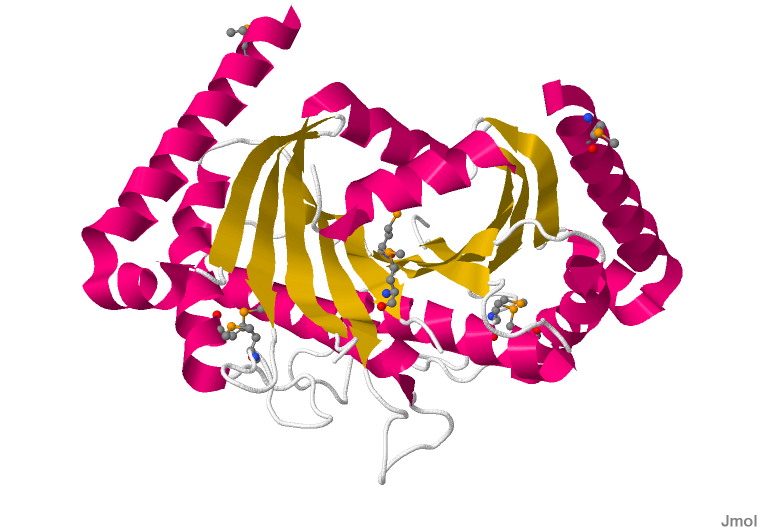
- Structure of the periplasmic domain of MotB from Salmonella.

Identifiers
- Organism: Escherichia coli
- Symbol: motB
- Entrez: 946402
- Orthologs: NCBI: entry; OMA: entry
- RefSeq (Prot): NP_416403
- UniProt: P0AF06

Other data
- Chromosome: chromosome: 1.97 - 1.97 Mb
Search for
- Structures: Swiss-model
- Domains: InterPro

Motility protein B also known as MotB is a bacterial protein that is encoded by the motB gene. It's a component of the flagellar motor. More specifically, MotA and MotB makes the stator of a flagellum and surround the rotor as a ring of about 8-10 particles. MotA and MotB are integral membrane proteins. While both MotA and MotB surround the MS ring, MotB also anchors MotA to cell wall peptidoglycan. These two proteins form pores that harvest energy for flagellar mechanical movement by proton motive force (PMF) across the membrane. Cellular metabolic processes such as the electron transport chain move protons outside the cell, creating more protons and more positive charge in the extracellular space. When the protons flow back into the cell through MotA and MotB along concentration and charge gradients, they release energy that is used for flagellar rotation. The speed of the flagellar motor is dependent on the magnitude of the PMF acting on MotA and MotB.

== See also ==
- MotA - MotA and MotB make the stator
- PomA - protein that is part of the stator in Na+
- PomB - protein that is part of the stator in Na+
- Integral membrane protein a type of membrane protein
- Archaellum
- Cilium
- Ciliopathy
- Rotating locomotion in living systems
- Undulipodium
