= Type II secretion system =

Bacterial system for secreting proteins

Bacterial type II and III secretion system protein

Identifiers
- Symbol: Secretin
- Pfam: PF00263
- InterPro: IPR004846
- TCDB: 3.A.5
- OPM superfamily: 348
- OPM protein: 5wln
- Membranome: 430
Available protein structures:
- PDB: IPR004846 PF00263 (ECOD; PDBsum)
- AlphaFold: IPR004846; PF00263

The type 2 secretion system (often referred to as the type II secretion system or by the initials T2SS) is a type of protein secretion machinery found in various species of Gram-negative bacteria, including many human pathogens such as Pseudomonas aeruginosa and Vibrio cholerae. The type II secretion system is one of six protein secretory systems commonly found in Gram-negative bacteria, along with the type I, type III, and type IV secretion systems, as well as the chaperone/usher pathway, the autotransporter pathway/type V secretion system, and the type VI secretion system (some bacteria also utilize the type VII secretion system). Like these other systems, the type II secretion system enables the transport of cytoplasmic proteins across the lipid bilayers that make up the cell membranes of Gram-negative bacteria. Secretion of proteins and effector molecules out of the cell plays a critical role in signaling other cells and in the invasion and parasitism of host cells.

== Overview ==
The type II secretion system is a membrane-bound protein complex found in Gram-negative bacteria that is used to secrete proteins found in the cytoplasm of the bacteria into the extracellular space outside of the cell. The type II secretion system is just one of many secretory systems found in Gram-negative bacteria and is used to secrete a variety of different proteins, including bacterial toxins and degradative enzymes such as proteases and lipases. These secreted proteins are generally associated with the breakdown of host tissues and therefore are often important in causing the symptoms associated with certain bacterial infections. Each bacterial cell may contain a number of type II secretion complexes, which are found embedded in the inner and outer membranes of the cell.

Along with other secretory systems such as the chaperone/usher pathway and the type IV secretion system, type II secretion is a two-step process. The first step involves the Sec and Tat secretory pathways, which are responsible for transporting proteins across the inner membrane into the periplasm. For instance, the Sec pathway is used to transport structural components of the type II secretion system into the periplasm where they can then assemble, while both the Sec and Tat pathways are used to transport secretory proteins into the periplasm. Once these secretory proteins are located in the periplasm, the second step can then take place, whereby they are secreted across the outer membrane into the extracellular milieu.

== Structure ==

Overall the type II secretion system is a large multiprotein machinery, made up of a number of distinct protein subunits known as the general secretory proteins (GSPs). The genes encoding these GSPs are usually found together in the genome in a single operon and many of these genes overlap. Each gene is named with a letter corresponding to the GSP that it encodes (for example the gspD gene encodes GspD) and studies indicate that between 12 and 15 of these genes are essential to the function of the type II secretion system. The GSPs are common among a number of different bacterial species and when they come together they form a complex that is structurally very similar to the type IV pili, an appendage that is also commonly found in gram negative bacteria. Overall the type II secretion system can be broken down into four main components. These are the outer membrane complex, the inner membrane complex, the secretion ATPase and the pseudopilus.

=== Outer membrane complex ===
The outer membrane complex is made up largely by the secretin GspD. Secretins are β-barrels that are found in membrane where they form channels that allow substances to move in or out of cells. In the type II secretion system GspD creates a pore in the outer membrane of the bacterial cell through which proteins can be secreted. As a result, GspD is essential for the correct function system because without it secretory proteins cannot exit the cell. GspD is transported into the periplasm via the Sec translocon and is then inserted into the outer membrane. This insertion is not spontaneous however and is often reliant upon the β-barrel assembly machinery which ensures β-barrel proteins are folded correctly before insertion into the membrane.

GspD is often found associated with the lipoprotein GspS. GspS is also transported into the periplasm using the Sec translocation machinery, at which point it is inserted into the inner layer of the outer membrane where it remains closely associated with GspD. It is thought that GspS plays an important role in the stabilization of the secretin GspD and helps prevent it from breaking down in the presence of highly degradative periplasmic enzymes.

The translocation process of GspD to the outer membrane differs between GspD homologs. Escherichia coli secretins GspDα and GspDβ show distinct translocation mechanisms in vitro. The GspDβ forms its multimer on the inner membrane and interacts with GspS (pilotin), which disassembles GspDβ into its monomers. The monomers are guided through the peptidoglycan layer by GspS and forms the GspDβ multimer on the outer membrane together with GspS, forming a GspDβ-GspS complex. GspDα however, can translocate to the outer membrane without the assistance of pilotin in the presence of D-methionine. In the case of GspDα, it forms its multimer on the inner membrane, where it exists in an unstable form shifting between two confirmations. Reduced cross-linking in the peptidoglycan, induced by D-methionine, causes the formation of pores in the peptidoglycan layer which allows GspDα to translocate to the outer membrane, where it exists in a more stable and connected confirmation.

=== Inner membrane complex ===
The inner membrane complex is made up of several different Gsp proteins which are embedded in the inner membrane. Like the outer membrane secretin GspD these proteins are transported into the periplasm via the Sec translocation pathway before being inserted into the inner membrane. Four different proteins make up the inner membrane complex; these are GspC, GspF, GspL and GspM.

Each of these individual subunits plays a slightly different role. GspC for instance has been shown to interact with GspD. This interaction helps gate the type II secretion system and only when this gate is open are secretory proteins able to enter the system and be pumped out of the cell. Importantly, when associated together, GspC, GspL and GspM help protect each other from proteolytic enzymes that would otherwise degrade them. Unlike the other proteins that make up the inner membrane complex GspF is a multipass transmembrane protein and it may play a role in binding the secretion ATPase. GspL is however known to form tight interactions with the secretion ATPase and these are needed to hold it in close association with the rest of the inner membrane complex.

=== Secretion ATPase ===
The secretion ATPase, GspE, is an ATPase which is found closely associated with the inner membrane complex on the cytoplasmic side of the inner membrane. GspE belongs to the type II/type IV secretion ATPase family. ATPases belonging to this family have a distinct hexameric structure. Each individual subunit of the hexamer has 3 main domains. These are 2 separate N-terminal domains called N1D and N2D which are separated by a short linker region and a single C-terminal domain termed the CTD. The CTD in turn is made up of 3 subdomains, one of which is a nucleotide binding domain. It is this nucleotide binding domain, which is present in of each of the 6 subunits of the hexamer, that is responsible for binding ATP. The other 2 domains that make up the CTD, a four helical domain and a metal binding domain, then help catalyze the hydrolysis of bound ATP. This ATP hydrolysis is used to power the assembly and disassembly of the pseudopillus which is what drives secretion via the type II secretion system. As a result, the system cannot function without GspE. The N-terminal domains N1D and N2D form the interactions with the inner membrane complex which help keep the secretion ATPase in close association with the rest of the type II secretion system. The N2D domain is not fully understood but observations show that it is the N1D which is responsible for forming the tight interactions seen with the inner membrane complex subunit GspL.

=== Pseudopilus ===
The pseudopilus is found in the periplasm but does not extend out through the secretin GspD into the extracellular milieu. Its name it derived from the fact that it is made up of a number of pilin like proteins or pseudopilins, known as GspG, GspH, GspI, GspJ and GspK. They are known as pseudopilins due to their similarity to the pilins (like PilA) that make up the type IV pili found in gram negative bacteria. Like their counterparts, the pseudopilins are initially produced in an immature form. These pre-pseudopilins consist of an N-terminal signal sequence that targets the proteins to the Sec translocon and a long C-terminal passenger domain which encodes the actual pseudopilin protein itself. Once the Sec machinery has transported the pre-pseudopilin across the inner membrane, but before the protein itself is released into the periplasm, the N-terminal signal sequence is cleaved at a conserved stretch of positively charged amino acid residues. This cleavage is catalysed by the signal peptidase GspO and the end result is the removal of the N-terminal signal sequence and the formation of a mature pseudopilin. GspO is inserted in the inner membrane and is often closely associated with the type II secretion system machinery. Mature pilins and pseudopilins have a lollipop-shaped structure, made up of a long hydrophobic tail and a globular hydrophilic head domain. Once in the periplasm in their mature state, the pseudopilins will then often be inserted into the outer leaflet of the inner membrane via their hydrophobic tails.

The major pseudopilin present in the pseudopilus is GspG. The pseudopilus forms when the individual pseudopilin subunits polymerize together. In this reaction the hydrophobic tails of different pseudopilins mesh together leaving their globular hydrophilic heads exposed. These long hydrophobic tails are able to aggregate together like this due to strong hydrophobic interactions and the end result is that the pseudopilus steadily grows. The assembly and disassembly of these pseudopilus subunits is powered by the secretion ATPase GspE. It is thought that this constant extension and retraction of the pseudopilus causes it to act like a piston and push secretory proteins out through the outer membrane secretin. When the pseudopilus then retracts new secretory proteins can then enter the system and the process will repeat. This movement of the pseudopilus is similar to the movement displayed by type IV pili which is known to enable twitching motility.

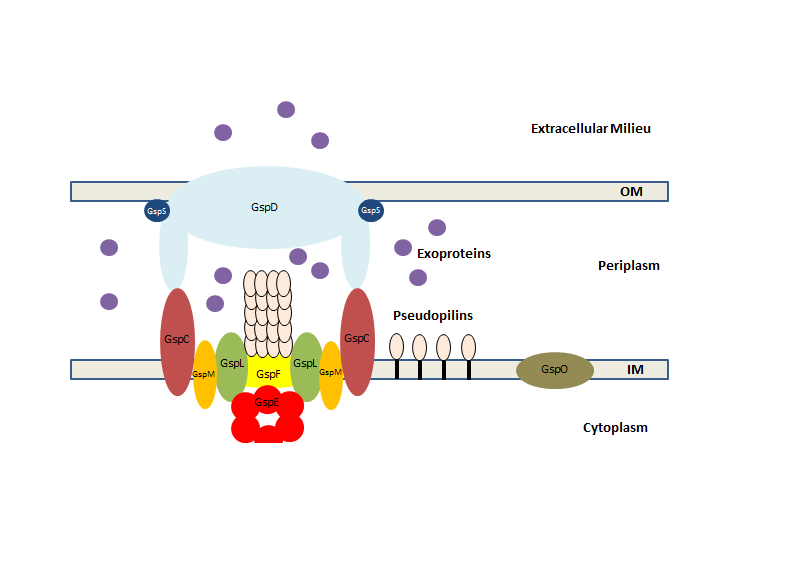
Diagram showing the type II secretion system

== Mechanism ==
Secretion of proteins via the type II secretion system occurs in a very specific way and is largely uniform among different species of bacteria. This mechanism can be broken down into several steps:

1. Exoproteins, or proteins that are to be secreted, are first transported across the inner membrane and into the periplasm via the Sec translocation machinery. These exoproteins will exist here in the periplasm secretion until the type II secretion system is activated.
2. Pre-pseudopilins are also transported from the cytoplasm into the periplasm via the Sec translocation machinery. Once in the periplasm they are cleaved by the pre-pilin peptidase GspO and converted into mature pseudopilins. The mature pseudopilins can then insert themselves into the inner membrane where they will exist until pseudopilus assembly occurs.
3. The secretion ATPase GspE will then bind and hydrolyze ATP and the energy produced is used to power the formation of the pseudopilus. GspE is located in the cytoplasm but remains associated with the inner membrane complex via interactions with both GspL and GspF.
4. When activated, the exoproteins previously transported into the periplasm are able to enter the secretion machinery. It is not fully understood how these exoproteins are selected for, but it is believed the interaction between GspC and GspD plays an important role.
5. The assembly of the pseudopilus then forces the exoproteins out through the secretin GspD and into the extracellular milieu. This secretin forms a hydrophilic channel in the outer membrane which allows the proteins to exit the cell.
6. Once outside of the cell the secreted exoproteins can then carry out their intended effects. Some of these for instance may be involved in signalling and others may act as virulence factors that help promote infection.

It is believed that quorum sensing plays a key role in controlling the activation of the type II secretion system and the initiation of exoprotein release. Specifically quorum sensing helps regulate the transcription of the genes encoding these exoproteins and ensures that they are only produced when other like bacteria are nearby and environmental conditions are conducive to survival and infection.

== See also ==
- Type IV filament
