= Type IV filament =

Family of cell projections including T2SS and T4P

The type IV filament (TFF or T4F) is a superfamily of fibrous protein structures assembled in Prokaryotes by machineries that include a set of four evolutionarily related proteins: the eponymous type IV pilin, a prepilin peptidase, an AAA+ ATPase, and an integral cytoplasmic membrane platform.

The TFF superfamily seems to have originated in the last universal common ancestor, from where it diversified into archaella, different type IV pili subtypes, and type II secretion systems.
