= Type VII secretion system =

Type VII secretion systems are bacterial secretion systems first observed in the phyla Actinomycetota and Bacillota. Bacteria use such systems to transport, or secrete, proteins into the environment. The bacterial genus Mycobacterium uses type VII secretion systems (T7SS) to secrete proteins across their cell envelope. The first T7SS system discovered was the ESX-1 System.

T7SS has been studied as a virulence factor associated with the ESX-1 system in Mycobacterium tuberculosis. These secretion systems are often found in gram-positive bacteria. Type VII secretion systems are necessary in Mycobacterium because of their impermeable membrane. The RD1 locus or Gene for Type VII secretion can create a lytic effect through ESX-1 transport.

== Structure ==
Cryogenic electron microscopy was used to determine that a complex of two identical subunits made from four proteins forms the structure of the type VII secretion system in Mycobacterium smegmatis. T7SS forms a six-sided complex that allows for nearly 165 membrane attachments. This shows how complex the secretion system is. The MDa complex of the Type VII secretion system is found embedded in the inner membrane.

The T7SS structure in Mycobacteria is 28.5 nm in width and 20 nm in height. This secretion system is composed of the following components: inner EccB5, outer EccB5, EccC5, inner EccD5, outer EccD5, EccE5 and MycP5. These components make the 2.32-MDa complex. This complex is connected to an inner membrane by 165 transmembrane helices. The membrane is composed of a trimer of dimers. The dimers are made up of one copy of MycP5, EccB5, EccC5, EccE5, and two copies of EccD5. The MycP5 structure is what stabilizes the complex. Without the MycP5 complex, EccB5 copies cannot make the stable triangular scaffold. In the membrane EccD5 create barrels that are hypothetically filled with lipids. EccC is the only component of the T7SS that is present in all species that contain a type VII secretion system.

== Mechanism ==
The core machinery of the Type VII secretion system is found in the inner membrane. Once this core machinery is assembled the Type VII secretion system exports alpha helical protein residues using ATP-ase. Type VII secretion systems use proteins from the ESX-1 system of secretion proteins. T7SS uses unique proteins as compared to other secretion systems.

== Species distribution ==
Secretion systems are commonly found in gram-positive bacteria and Mycobacterium. There is also a system referred to as a T7SS in gram negative bacteria.

In gram negative bacteria a Type VII 'like" secretion system has been observed. It is known as the chaperone-usher fimbriae. This system helps gram negative bacteria colonize, form biofilms, and causes an increase in pathogenicity in the bacteria that utilize it. These systems are observable when genes for a fimbrial usher protein (which is integral to the formation of a pilus in gram negative bacteria), a chaperone protein, and the building blocks of fimbriae are found together.

The Type VII secretion system, however, was first observed in firmicutes and actinobacteria, specifically Mycobacterium tuberculosis. The type VII secretion system plays an important role in interbacterial competition, nutrient acquisition, and virulence in Firmicutes (which are spore-forming bacteria). This type of secretion system has also been observed to play a role in the virulence and cytotoxicity of Streptococcus species.

This system uses different proteins in order to function in varying species. The system alters itself and produces variants within each new species. These system variants are identified based on EssC- C terminus and other associated effectors. Variants have been observed in the following species: 4 variants in group B streptococcus and Staphylococcus aureus, and 7 variants within Listeria monocytogenes. This type of secretion system also provides essential cell functions pathways with which to proceed. Mycobacteria have a cell membranes that are impenetrable, T7SS allow for substrates to pass through, making the Type VII Secretion system (also known as ESX) essential for mycobacterial growth and virulence.

== Role in virulence ==
T7SS plays a role in the virulence of mycobacterium. Disruption in the genes that encode T7SS called the RD1 locus results in the loss of function of secretion apparatus. The genes necessary for ESX-1 transport have also been found outside of the RD1 locus. This means that multiple genes are required for protein transport and disruption of these genes results in the loss of function in the secretion systems. The ESX-1 system secretes polypeptides which causes a lytic effect though the specific polypeptide is not known. The extended RD1 (extRD1) region expresses membrane lytic activity in mycobacteria. The extRD1 genes are necessary for haemolysis activity. Genetic changes to the ESX-1 system result in the loss of a secretion activity. In infection models this leads to a loss of virulence.
