= MOTB =

MOTB or MotB can refer to:

- Neverwinter Nights 2: Mask of the Betrayer, a 2007 video game
- Motility protein B, a bacterial protein
  - motB, the gene that encodes the protein
- Museum of the Bible, a history museum in Washington, D.C., U.S.
- Mark of the beast, in Christianity
- Mutiny on the Bounty (band)
