= PilZ domain =

PilZ
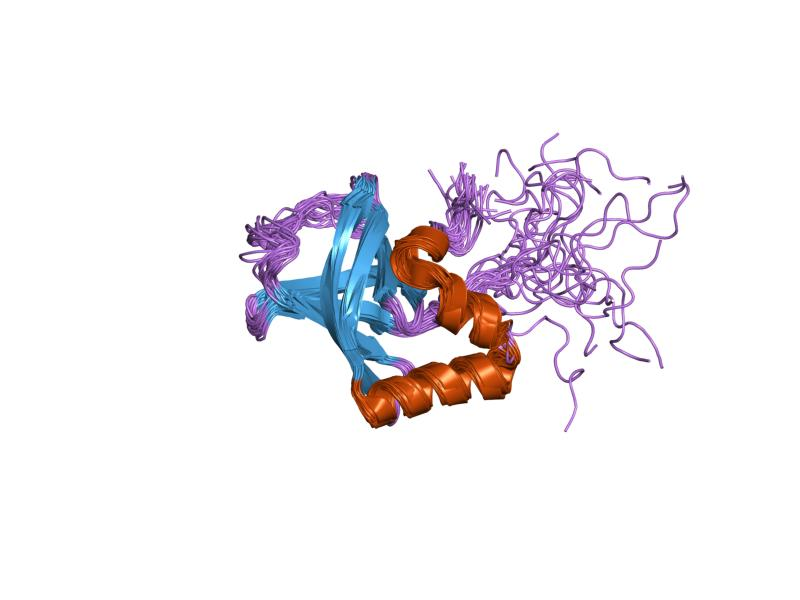
- the solution NMR structure of the protein of unknown function vca0042 from vibrio cholerae o1

Identifiers
- Symbol: PilZ
- Pfam: PF07238
- InterPro: IPR009875
Available protein structures:
- PDB: IPR009875 PF07238 (ECOD; PDBsum)
- AlphaFold: IPR009875; PF07238

The PilZ protein family is named after the type IV pilus control protein first identified in Pseudomonas aeruginosa, expressed as part of the pil operon. It has a cytoplasmic location and is essential for type IV fimbrial, or pilus, biogenesis. PilZ is a c-di-GMP binding domain and PilZ domain-containing proteins represent the best studied class of c-di-GMP effectors. C-di-GMP, cyclic diguanosine monophosphate, the second messenger in cells, is widespread in and unique to the bacterial kingdom. Elevated intracellular levels of c-di-GMP generally cause bacteria to change from a motile single-cell state to a sessile, adhesive surface-attached multicellular state called biofilm.

Proteins which contain PilZ are known to interact with the flagellar switch-complex proteins FliG and FliM and this is mediated via the c-di-GMP-PliZ complex. This interaction results in a reduction of torque-generation and induces counterclockwise motor bias that slows the motor and induces counterclockwise rotation, inhibiting chemotaxis.

Binding and mutagenesis studies of several PilZ domain proteins have shown that c-di-GMP binding depends on residues in RxxxR and D/NxSxxG sequence-motifs. The crystal structure, at 1.7 A, of a PilZ domain::c-di-GMP complex from Vibrio cholerae shows c-di-GMP contacting seven of nine strongly conserved residues. Binding of c-di-GMP causes a conformational switch whereby the C- and N-terminal domains are brought into close opposition forming a new allosteric interaction surface that spans these domains and the c-di-GMP at their interface.

The PilZ domain is also implicated in the bacterial pathogenicity of the Lyme disease spirochaete, Borrelia burgdorferi, through its binding partner c-di-GMP.
