= P fimbriae =

P fimbriae (also known as pyelonephritis-associated pili, P pili, or Pap) are chaperone-usher type (specifically of the π family) fimbrial appendages found on the surface of many Escherichia coli bacteria. The P fimbria is considered to be one of the most important virulence factor in uropathogenic E. coli and plays an important role in upper urinary tract infections. P fimbriae mediate adherence to host cells, a key event in the pathogenesis of urinary tract infections.

== Structure and expression ==
P fimbriae are large, linear structures projecting from the surface of the bacterial cell. With lengths of 1-2um, the pili can be larger than the diameter of the bacteria itself. The main body of the fimbriae is composed of approx. 1000 copies of the major fimbrial subunit protein PapA, forming a helical rod. The short fimbrial tip is made of the subunits PapK, PapE, PapF and the tip adhesin PapG, which mediates the binding.

Structure of the P fimbriae

The fimbria is assembled by a chaperone-usher system, and proteins required for the assembly are expressed by the Pap operon, which is located on pathogenicity islands. The genes of the Pap operon encode five structural proteins (PapA, PapK, PapE, PapF and PapG), four proteins involved in the transport and assembly (PapD, PapH, PapC, PapJ) and two proteins (PapB, PapI) regulating the operon expression.

== Role during infection ==
Adherence to host uroepithelial cells is a crucial step during the infection that allows uropathogenic E.coli to colonize the urinary tract and prevents bacterial removal during micturition. The binding of the P fimbriae to epithelial cells is mediated by the tip adhesin PapG. Four different alleles of PapG have been described, which bind to different glycolipid structures on host cells. In humans, especially variant papGII and papGIII have shown to be clinically relevant.

Variant PapGII binds preferentially to globoside (GbO4), found abundantly on human kidney epithelial cells. PapGII triggers a strong inflammatory response which leads to tissue damage. Most E. coli strains causing pyelonephritis, urinary-source bacteremia and urosepsis produce P pili with PapGII. PapGIII binds to the Forssmann antigen (GbO5) as well as isoreceptors present in the urinary tract of humans. E. coli strains carrying the papGIII gene are associated with lower urinary tract infections (cystitis) and asymptomatic bacteriuria. PapGI adhesins bind preferentially to globotriaosylceramide (GbO3), while the isoreceptors of PapGIV are unknown. E. coli carrying genes for PapGI and PapGIV are rarely found in E. coli causing infections in humans.

Frequency (in %) of variants papGII and papGIII in relation to clinical origin of E.coli isolates.
	fecal	asymptomatic bacteriuria	cystitis	pyelonephritis	urosepsis
papGII	15	20	20	60	70
papGIII	10	15	20	20	10
