= Mating bridge =

A mating bridge, also known as a conjugation or population bridge, is a connection between two bacterial cells that provides a passageway for DNA in bacterial conjugation.

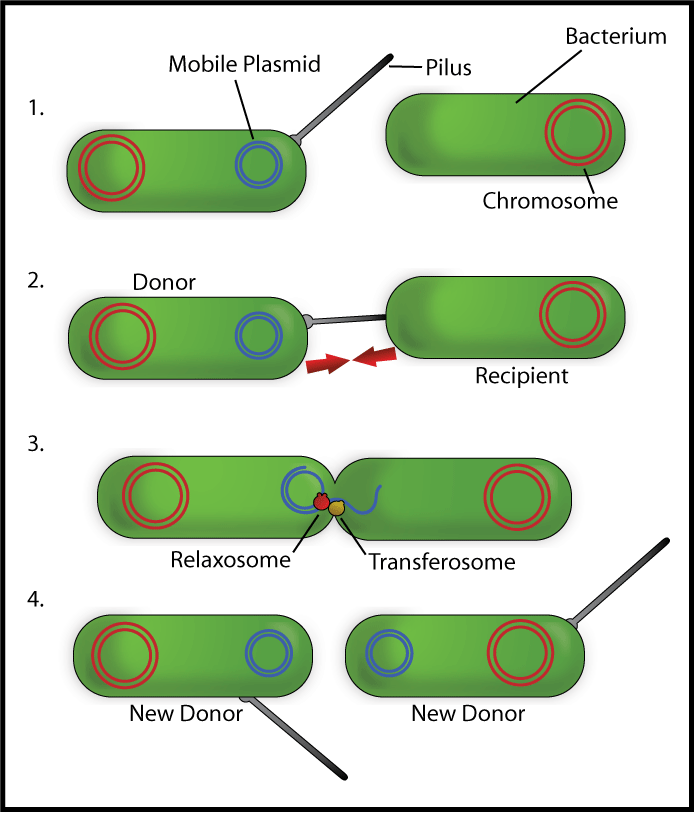
Bacterial Conjugation. Note that the sex pilus is a structure on the F^{+} cell whereas the mating bridge (not labeled) is the connection between the two bacteria.

A mating bridge is different from a sex pilus, which is a structure made by an F^{+} strain bacterium in bacterial conjugation. The pili (plural) act as attachment sites that promote the binding of bacteria to each other. In this way, an F^{+} strain makes physical contact with an F^{−} strain. Once contact is made, the pili shorten and thereby draw the donor and recipient cells closer together. A conjugation bridge is then formed between the two cells, which provides a passageway for DNA transfer.
