= Chaperone-usher fimbriae =

Chaperone-usher fimbriae (CU) are linear, unbranching, outer-membrane pili secreted by gram-negative bacteria through the chaperone-usher system rather than through type IV secretion or extracellular nucleation systems. These fimbriae are built up out of modular pilus subunits, which are transported into the periplasm in a Sec dependent manner. Chaperone-usher secreted fimbriae are important pathogenicity factors facilitating host colonisation, localisation and biofilm formation in clinically important species such as uropathogenic Escherichia coli and Pseudomonas aeruginosa.

== Structure ==
=== Overall ===
All chaperone/usher systems are found within gene clusters consisting of at least an usher, a chaperone and one or more fimbriae subunits. Overall the system includes periplasmic chaperones, periplasmic and extracellular pilus subunits, dimeric usher outer membrane pore and associated Sec machinery. The Pilus subunits polymerise via a non-covalent interaction to form the mature pilus which consists of an adhesive tip, helical body and an usher bound base. The P-pilus (pap) system is one of the best characterised and is shown below.

A schematic overview of the pap chaperone-usher system showing all subunits and their organisation. PapD is the chaperone; PapC is the usher; PapA and the remaining subunits form the fimbria itself

=== Usher structure and function ===
The usher forms the outer-membrane pore and functions in vivo as a dimer, though only one of the ushers is active at any one time. The usher pore (PapC) is formed by a 24 stranded beta barrel with 4 additional domains: N-terminal domain (NTD), Plug domain, and two C-terminal domains (CTD1 and CTD2 respectively). The NTD and CTDs function to bring chaperone/subunit complexes to the growing pilus and facilitate translocation across the pore. The plug domain acts to stop premature formation of a pilus and can either be located inside the pore or on the periplasmic side of the membrane. In the active dimeric usher one of the usher has the plug located periplasmically and the other has it located inside the translocation pore.

=== Chaperone structure and function ===
The periplasmic chaperone (PapD) has a 'boomerang' structure formed by an immunoglobulin (Ig) like fold with an essential C-terminal extension (G1). This fold is formed by 13 β strands (A1-G1) and 4 short α helices. Chaperones belong to one of two families based on the length of the loop connecting the beta strands F1 and G1. Long looped chaperones are FGL and short looped chaperones are FGS. The chaperone functions to stop aggregation and degradation of pilus subunits by binding their interfacing regions and facilitating correct protein folding before bringing them to the usher/fimbriae complex.

=== Pilin subunit structure and function ===
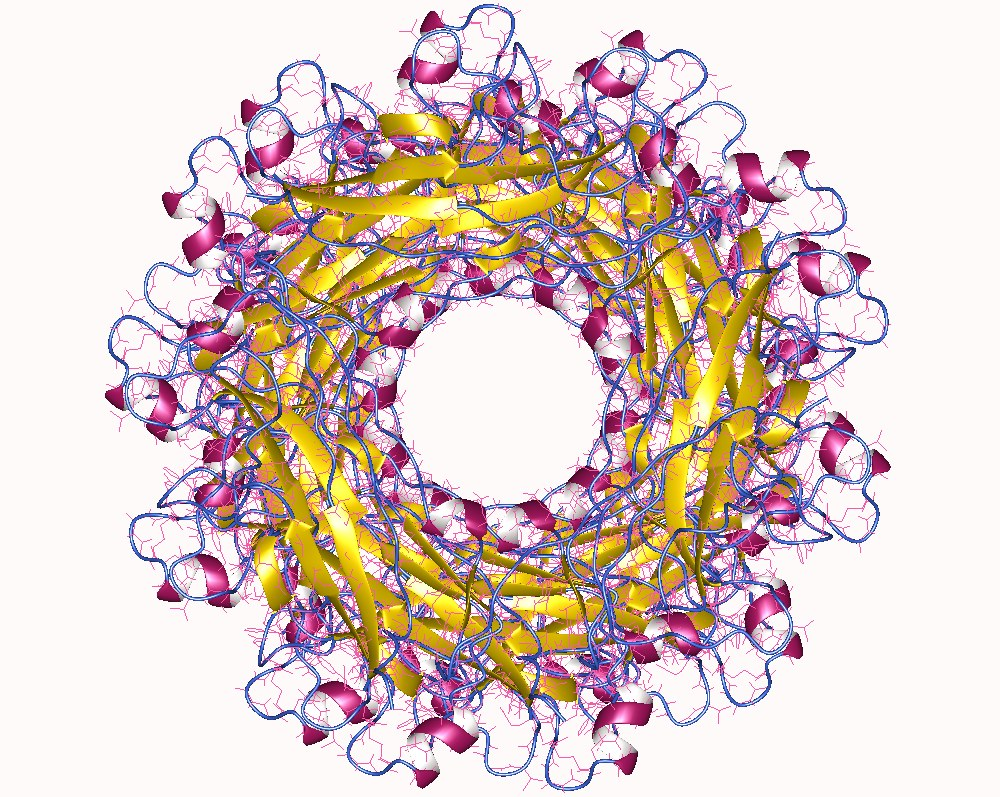
PAP pilin major protein, PapA homo13mer, top view, E.Coli.

The pilus subunit structure also has an Ig-like fold but with an essential N-terminal extension rather than a C-terminal extension. Because this N-terminal extension is the same β strand that normally completes the Ig fold, a large hydrophobic cleft is formed in the mature subunit (P1-P5), this cleft is both essential to pilus biogenesis but also necessitates a chaperone to stabilise the structure. Particular subunits may have additional domains e.g. papG has an adhesive lectin domain. In vivo pilus subunits function to form the main body of the helical pilus (approximately 3.28 subunits per turn), and the adhesive head.

== Biogenesis ==
Pilus biogenesis proceeds via the strand complementation mechanism, the mechanism functions as a direct consequence of the structures of both the chaperones and pilus subunits. Both the G1 extension of the chaperone and the N-terminal extension of the pilus subunits can bind to the hydrophobic P1-P5 cleft. When the G1 is bound it binds in a parallel conformation stabilising the subunit structure but doesn't form a true Ig fold (which is anti-parallel). It also only binds the cleft from sites P1-P4 leaving the P5 pocket exposed. When another subunit binds the hydrophobic cleft it binds in a P5-P2 anti-parallel fashion creating the most energetically favourable conformation of a true Ig-fold.

When a chaperone/subunit complex is brought to the growing usher/pilus complex (note that a chaperone/subunit complex forms the base of this) the NTD and CTDs of the usher dimer bring and hold the chaperone/subunit complex to the pilus base. Here the N-terminal extension of the subunit interacts with the free P5 pocket of the pilus. This binding causes a residue by residue 'unzipping' of the chaperone's G1 strand with concurrent 'zipping' of the N-terminal extension of the chaperone/subunit complex, unknown as the zip in-zip out mechanism.

Once the chaperone has been displaced it diffuses back to the sec machinery to bind another emerging pilus subunit. The usher using is CTDs then translocates the longer pilus across the translocation pore by one residue until the chaperone is in close association with the usher. This translocation is coupled with a slight rotation giving the pilus its helical structure. This growth proceeds until a terminating subunit binds the pilus (if one exists), terminating subunits lack the P5 pocket and thus almost irreversibly bind their chaperone. Since the usher can only translocate pilus subunits and not chaperone/subunit complexes, and the fact that the chaperone can't be energetically out-competed by another subunit (due to lack of P5) this terminating subunit anchors the pilus to the outer membrane and stop any further pilus growth.

== Nomenclature and Classification ==
Historically classification of fimbriae was made based on their appearance under the microscope creating 4 classes: Afimbrial, type 1 fimbriae, bundle forming (type IV) pilus and curli. However this type of classification doesn't give any measure of relatedness and thus has been superseded by a phylogenetic system.

In chaperone/usher fimbriae there are broadly two types of classification: Based on the type of usher present, or based on the type of chaperone present. Using the usher as the base of classification forms 5 clades: alpha, beta, gamma, pi and sigma, and four sub clades: gamma 1-4. The naming of the beta and gamma clades are simply alphabetical, whereas the others are named by a defining feature: alpha for alternative chaperone/usher family; pi for P-pilus (pyelonephritis associated); and sigma for spore coat pilus from Myxococcus xanthus.

As stated previously there are two types of chaperone; FGL and FGS, and this is the basis of chaperone classification. All FGL chaperones are associated with afimbrial secretion and all FGS chaperones are associated with fimbrial secretion. All FGL chaperones are found in sub-clade gamma-3, all other clades and sub-clades are FGS.

== Pathogenicity ==
Chaperone/usher fimbriae have many roles, in many stages of pathogenicity in several species. The most well understood are roles in adhesion, innate immune evasion and localisation. Adhesion is facilitated by the lectin domain at the tip of chaperone/usher fimbriae, this domain of FimH is well understood. FimH is the first subunit of the type I pilus (γ-1 clade) in species such as UPEC and binds to D-mannosylated residues in the bladder, allowing pathogen adhesion and colonisation. Immune evasion is also facilitated by the tip adhesin, for example the binding of Decay accelerating factor (DAF) by gamma3 clade fimbriae inhibit effective complement activation. Localisation could be performed by sequential expression of different chaperone/usher systems. Most species of pathogenic bacteria express more than one type of chaperone/usher system, for example in Pseudomonas aeruginosa there are five different systems. UPEC expresses both the type 1 fimbriae and the P-pilus (pap) which it expresses sequentially possibly to facilitate migration from the bladder (type I fimbriae) to the kidney (pap).

This importance in pathogenicity makes the chaperone/usher system an attractive target for novel drug therapies. By targeting pathogenicity instead of the organism (in the case of conventional antibiotics) the strong selective pressure for evolution of resistance is removed. In the case of UPEC there have been some success in stopping pilus formation in clinical trials and the development of an effective vaccine in mice and cynomolgus monkeys based on FimCH complex.
