= Pilin =

Pilin refers to proteins that create pilus structures in bacteria. These structures can be used for the exchange of genetic material, or as a cell adhesion mechanism. Although not all bacteria have pili or fimbriae, bacterial pathogens often use their fimbriae to attach to host cells. In Gram-negative bacteria, where pili are more common, individual pilin molecules are linked by noncovalent protein-protein interactions, while Gram-positive bacteria often have polymerized LPXTG pilin.

== Type IV pilin ==
Pilin in Type IV pili
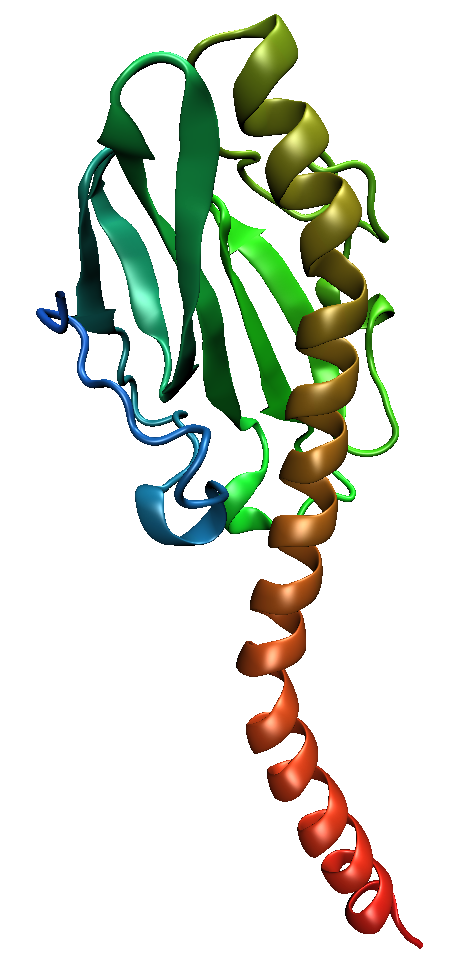
- Pilin protein from Neisseria gonorrhoeae, a parasitic bacterium that requires functional pili for pathogenesis.

Identifiers
- Symbol: Pili
- Pfam: PF00114
- InterPro: IPR001082
- PROSITE: PDOC00342
- SCOP2: 1paj / SCOPe / SUPFAM
- OPM superfamily: 68
- OPM protein: 2hil
Available protein structures:
- PDB: IPR001082 PF00114 (ECOD; PDBsum)
- AlphaFold: IPR001082; PF00114

Type IV pilin proteins are α+β proteins characterized by a very long N-terminal alpha helix. The assembly of these pili relies on interactions between the N-terminal helices of the individual monomers. The pilus structure sequesters the helices in the center of the fiber lining a central pore, while antiparallel beta sheets occupy the exterior of the fiber.

=== Role of ComP pilin in bacterial transformation ===
Genetic transformation is the process by which a recipient bacterial cell takes up DNA from a neighboring cell and integrates this DNA into the recipient's genome by homologous recombination. In Neisseria meningitidis, DNA transformation requires the presence of short DNA uptake sequences (DUSs) which are 9-10mers residing in both non-coding and coding regions of the donor DNA. Specific recognition of DUSs is mediated by a type IV pilin, ComP. Menningococcal type IV pili bind DNA through the minor pilin ComP via an electropositive stripe that is predicted to be exposed on the filament's surface. ComP displays an exquisite binding preference for selective DUSs. The distribution of DUSs within the N. meningitidis genome favors certain genes, suggesting that there is a bias for genes involved in genomic maintenance and repair.

== Chaperone-usher pilin ==
The Cup family is known for its use of a chaperone and at least an usher. They exhibit an Ig fold.

=== Saf, N-terminal extension ===
Saf-Nte_pilin
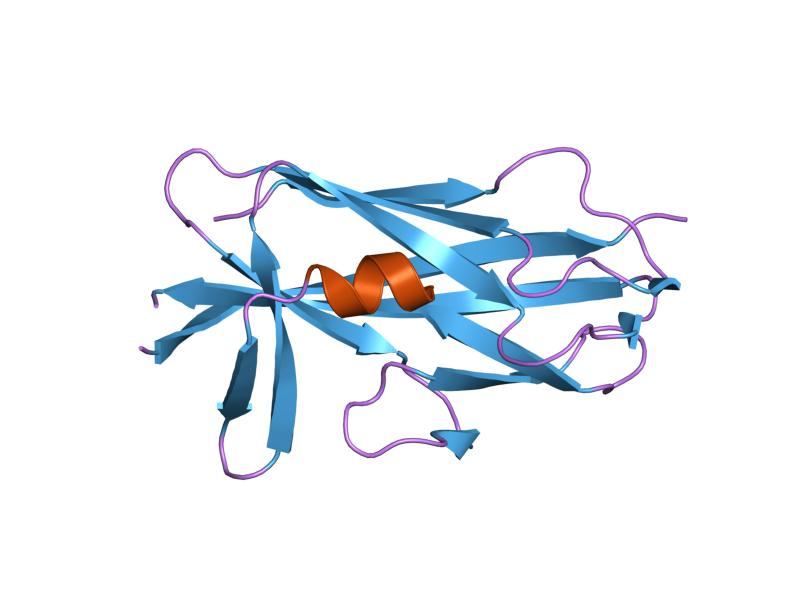
- Salmonella enterica SafA pilin in complex with a 19-residue SafA Nte peptide (f17a mutant)

Identifiers
- Symbol: Saf-Nte_pilin
- Pfam: PF09460
- InterPro: IPR018569
Available protein structures:
- PDB: IPR018569 PF09460 (ECOD; PDBsum)
- AlphaFold: IPR018569; PF09460

The Saf pilin N-terminal extension protein domain helps the pili to form, via a complex mechanism named the chaperone/usher pathway. It is found in all c-u pilins.

This protein domain is very important for such bacteria, as without pili formation, they could not infect the host. Saf is a Salmonella operon containing a c-u pilus system.

=== Function ===
This protein domain, has an important function in forming pili. These are virulence factors crucial for cell adhesion to the host and biofilm formation with successful infection.

=== Structure ===
This protein domain consists of the adjacent Saf-Nte and Saf-pilin chains of the pilus-forming complex. They are Chaperone/usher (CU) pili, and have an N-terminal extension (Nte) of around 10-20 amino acids. Salmonella Saf pili, which are assembled by FGl chaperones. The structure has been well conserved, as they contain a set of alternating hydrophobic residues that form an essential part of the subunit–subunit interaction.

=== Mechanism ===
The mechanism for the assembly reaction is termed donor strand exchange DSE which Pilus assembly in Gram-negative bacteria involves a Donor-strand exchange mechanism between the C- and the N-termini of this domain. The C-terminal subunit forms an incomplete Ig-fold which is then complemented by the 10-18 residue N terminus of another.

The N terminus sequences contain a motif of alternating hydrophobic residues that occupy the P2 to P5 binding pockets in the groove of the first pilus subunit.

== LPXTG pilin ==
LPXTG pilin is common in gram-positive cocci. They are named for a C-terminal motif used by the sortase. There is also a LPXTGase.

=== Development of molecular tools ===
LPXTG Pili in Gram-positive bacteria contain spontaneously formed isopeptide bonds. These bonds provide enhanced mechanical and proteolytic stability to the pilin protein. Recently, the pilin protein from Streptococcus pyogenes has been split into two fragments to develop a new molecular tool called the isopeptag. The isopeptag is a short peptide that can be attached to a protein of interest and can bind its binding partner through a spontaneously formed isopeptide bond. This new peptide tag can allow scientists to target and isolate their proteins of interest through a permanent covalent bond.

== See also ==
- Prepilin peptidase – Enzyme responsible for maturing type 4 pilins
