= Uptake signal sequence =

Uptake signal sequences (USS) are the short DNA sequences preferentially taken up by competent bacteria of the family Pasteurellaceae (e.g., Haemophilus influenzae). Similar sequences, called DNA uptake sequences (DUS), are found in species of the family Neisseriaceae (including Neisseria meningitidis and Neisseria gonorrhoeae).

== Neisseria meningitidis ==
Genetic transformation is the process by which a recipient bacterial cell takes up naked DNA from its environment and integrates this DNA into the recipient's genome by recombination. In N. meningitidis, DNA transformation requires the presence of short DUS (10-12 mers residing in coding and intergenic regions) of the donor DNA. Specific recognition of DUSs is mediated by a type IV pilin. Davidsen et al. reported that in N. meningitidis DUSs occur at a significantly higher density in genes involved in DNA repair and recombination (as well as in restriction-modification and replication) than in other annotated gene groups. These authors proposed that the over-representation of DUS in DNA repair and recombination genes may reflect the benefit of maintaining the integrity of the DNA repair and recombination machinery by preferentially taking up genome maintenance genes that could replace their damaged counterparts in the recipient cell's genome. Uptake of such genes could provide a mechanism for facilitating recovery from DNA damage after genotoxic stress.
