= Sonja-Verena Albers =

German microbiologist and academic

- Education: University of Groningen; University of Würzburg; Max Planck Institute of Biochemistry
- Scientific career
- Workplaces: University of Groningen; University of Freiburg
- Thesis: Sugar transport in the thermoacidophilic archaeon Sulfolobus solfataricus (2001)

Sonja-Verena Albers is a German microbiologist who is a professor at the University of Freiburg. Her research focuses on the cell biology of the archaea Sulfolobus acidocaldarius and Haloferax volcanii. She was elected Fellow of the American Society for Microbiology in 2023.

== Early life and education ==
Albers attended high school in Hamburg. She studied biology at the University of Würzburg, during which time she completed an internship at the Max Planck Institute of Biochemistry and became interested in Archaea. In Munich, she met a researcher from the Netherlands who studied Archaea, and their research interested her so much she moved to the University of Groningen. She completed her doctoral research in molecular microbiology at the University of Groningen, where she studied sugar transport in Sulfolobus solfataricus. After graduating she was made a Dutch Research Council postdoctoral researcher.

== Research and career ==
In 2006, Albers was awarded a Dutch Research Council VIDI grant to establish her own group at the University of Groningen. She moved to the Max Planck Institute for Terrestrial Microbiology in 2008, where her research interests moved to understanding the archaea cell envelope. In 2014 she was made a professor of microbiology at the University of Freiburg.

Albers has investigated the structure-property relationships of archaea and the molecular mechanisms that underpin the transmission of environmental cues to its motility structure. Archaea, one of the three domains of life, are single-cell life forms without a nucleus. They adapt to extreme living conditions (e.g. hot sulphur springs, salty lakes), are found in a variety of environments around the world. Albers' research uncovered the structure of proteins used by archaea to decide which direction to swim. She has studied fossils of archaea, which provide evidence of at least 3.5 billion years of life on Earth.

Albers used cryogenic electron microscopy to unravel the structure of archaea thread. Her work showed that the subunits of threads are interconnected via donor strand complementation, they have evolved differently from one another.

== Awards and honours ==
- 2019 Elected Member of the European Molecular Biology Organization
- 2023 Elected Fellow of the American Society for Microbiology

== Selected publications ==
- Albers, Sonja; Meyer, Benjamin (2011). "The archaeal cell envelope". Nature Reviews Microbiology. 9 (6): 414–426. doi:10.1038/nrmicro2576. PMID 21572458. Wikidata Q34185088.
- Jing Zhang; Rouillon, Christophe; Kerou, Melina; et al. (2012). "Structure and Mechanism of the CMR Complex for CRISPR-Mediated Antiviral Immunity". Molecular Cell. 45 (3): 303–13. doi:10.1016/j.molcel.2011.12.013. PMC 3381847. PMID 22227115. Wikidata Q27676627.
- John A Leigh; Albers, Sonja; Haruyuki Atomi; Allers, Thorsten (2011). "Model organisms for genetics in the domain Archaea: methanogens, halophiles, Thermococcales and Sulfolobales". FEMS Microbiology Reviews. 35 (4): 577–608. doi:10.1111/j.1574-6976.2011.00265.x. PMID 21265868. Wikidata Q37832278.
