= Rotating locomotion in living systems =

Rotational self-propulsion of organisms

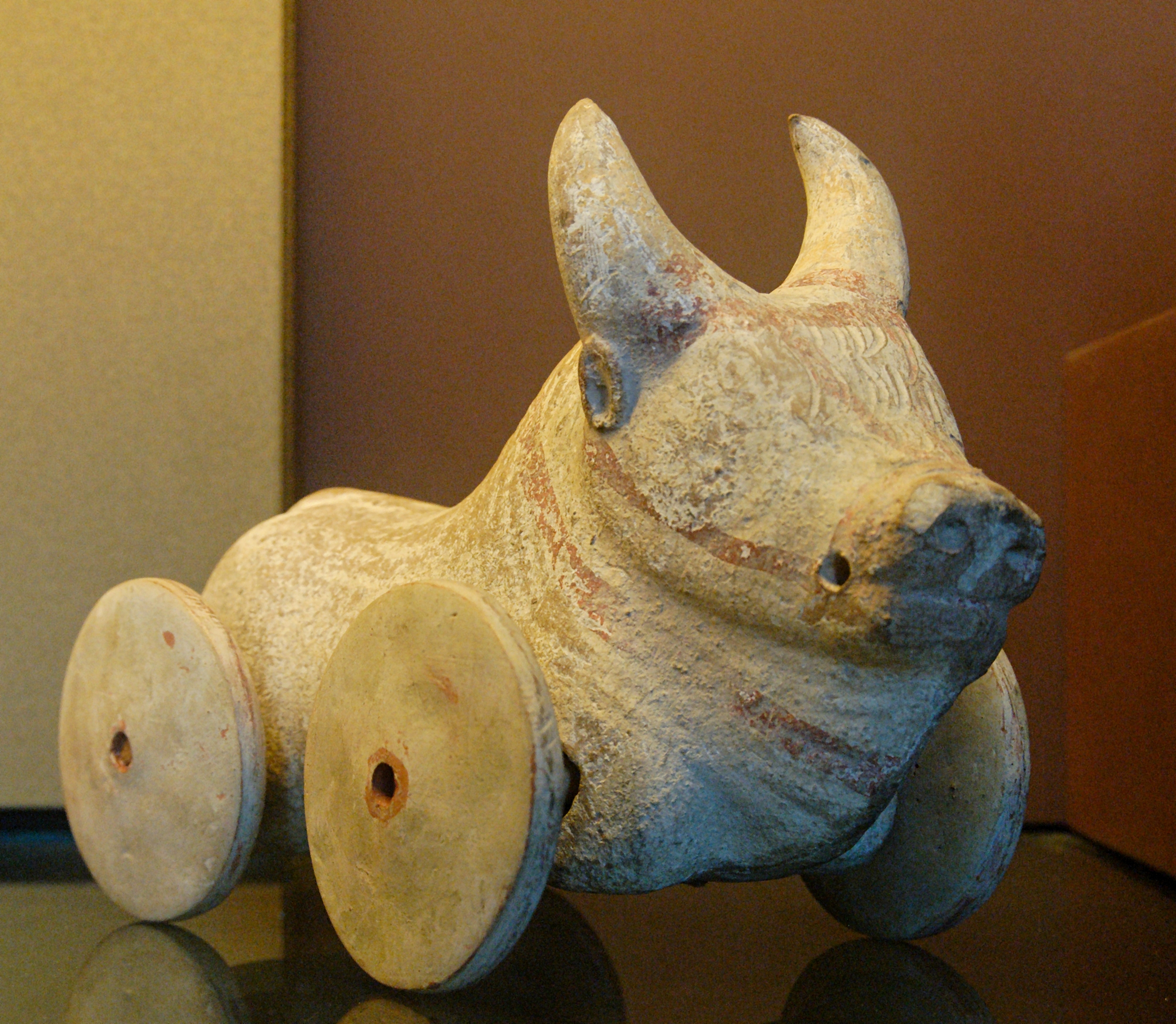
A wheeled buffalo figurine—probably a children's toy—from Magna Graecia

Although several organisms are capable of rolling locomotion, no organisms are known to use true wheels or propellers to locomote, with the exception of the corkscrew-like flagella of many prokaryotes. Biologists have offered several explanations for the apparent absence of biological wheels, and wheeled creatures have appeared often in speculative fiction.

Given the ubiquity of wheels in human technology, and the existence of biological analogues of many other technologies (such as wings and lenses), the lack of wheels in nature has seemed, to many scientists, to demand explanation—and the phenomenon is broadly explained by two factors: first, there are several developmental and evolutionary obstacles to the advent of a wheel by natural selection, and secondly, wheels have several drawbacks relative to other means of propulsion (such as walking, running, or slithering) in natural environments, which would tend to preclude their evolution. This environment-specific disadvantage has also led humans in certain regions to abandon wheels at least once in history.

== Known instances of rotation in biology ==
There exist two distinct modes of locomotion using rotation: first, simple rolling; and second, the use of wheels or propellers, which spin on an axle or shaft, relative to a fixed body. While many creatures employ the former mode, the latter is restricted to microscopic, single-celled organisms.

=== Rolling ===
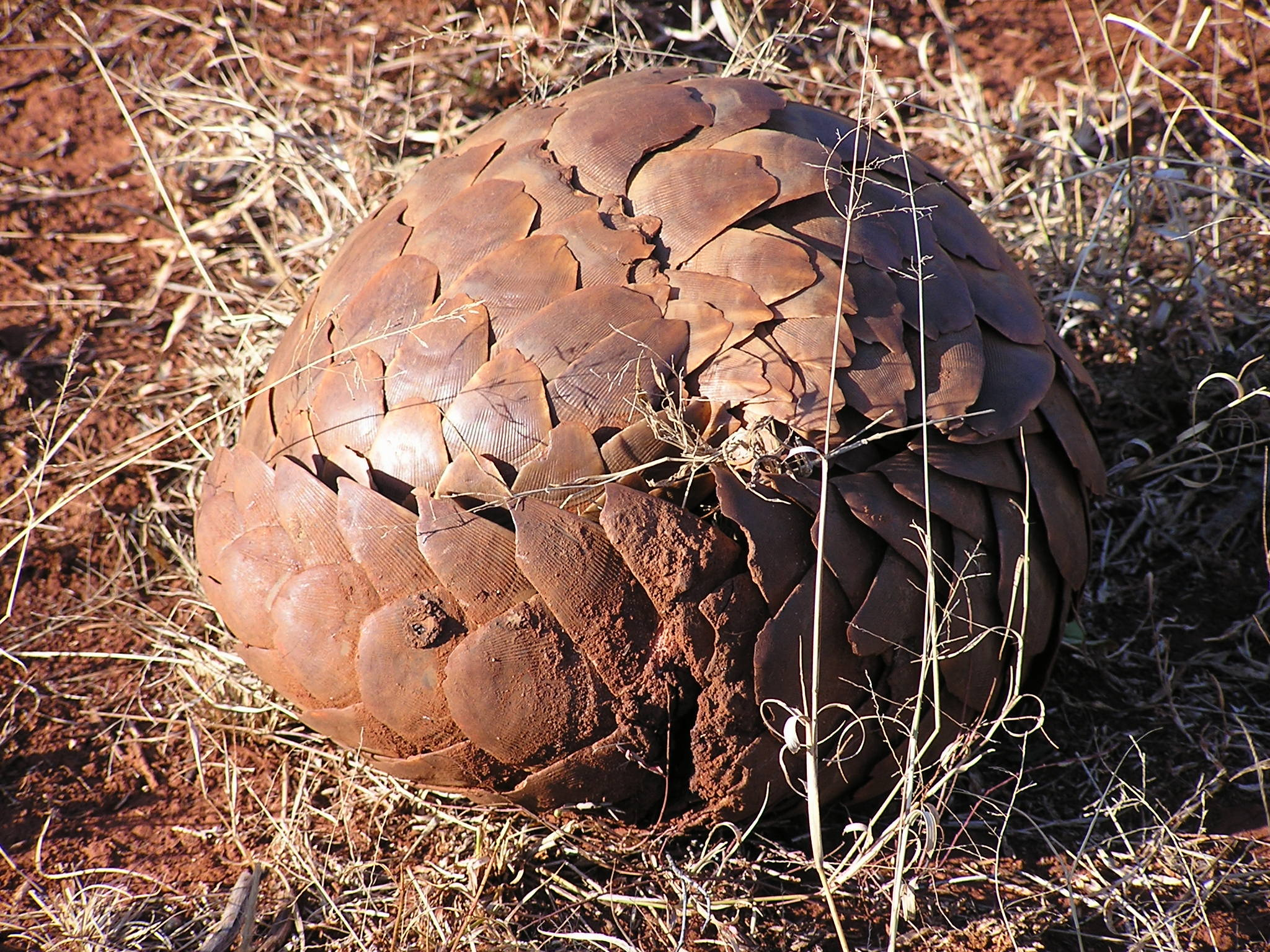
The pangolin Manis temminckii in a defensive posture, in which it can roll

Some organisms use rolling as a means of locomotion. These examples do not constitute the use of a wheel, as the organism rotates as a whole, rather than employing separate parts which rotate independently.

Several species of elongate organisms form their bodies into a loop to roll, including certain caterpillars (which do so to escape danger), tiger beetle larvae, myriapods, mantis shrimp, Armadillidiidae, and Mount Lyell salamanders. Other species adopt more spherical postures, primarily to protect their bodies from predators; this posture has been seen in pangolins, wheel spiders, hedgehogs, armadillos, armadillo girdled lizards, isopods, and fossilized trilobites. Pangolins and wheel spiders have been observed to purposely roll away from predators. These species may roll passively (under the influence of gravity or wind) or actively, typically by altering their shape to generate a propulsive force.

Tumbleweeds, which are the above-ground portions of certain plants, separate from their root structure and roll in the wind to distribute their seeds. These plants are found especially in open plain environments. The most well-known of these include Kali tragus (also known as Salsola tragus), or prickly Russian thistle, which arrived in North America in the late 19th century, and gained a reputation as a noxious weed. Fungi of the genus Bovista are known to use the same strategy to disperse their spores.

Rotifers are a phylum of microscopic but multi-celled animals, typically found in freshwater environments. Although the Latin name rotifer means 'wheel-bearer', these organisms do not have any rotating structures, but rather a ring of rhythmically beating cilia used for feeding and propulsion.

Keratinocytes, a type of skin cell, migrate with a rolling motion during the process of wound healing. These cells serve to form a barrier against pathogens and moisture loss through wounded tissue.

Dung beetles form spherical balls of animal excrement, which they roll with their bodies, generally by walking backwards and pushing the ball with their rear legs. Phylogenetic analysis indicates that this rolling behavior evolved independently several times. The behavior of these beetles was noted in ancient Egyptian culture, which imparted sacred significance to their activities. Although it is the dung ball that rolls rather than the beetle itself, the beetles face many of the same mechanical difficulties that rolling organisms contend with.

=== Free rotation ===
==== Macroscopic ====
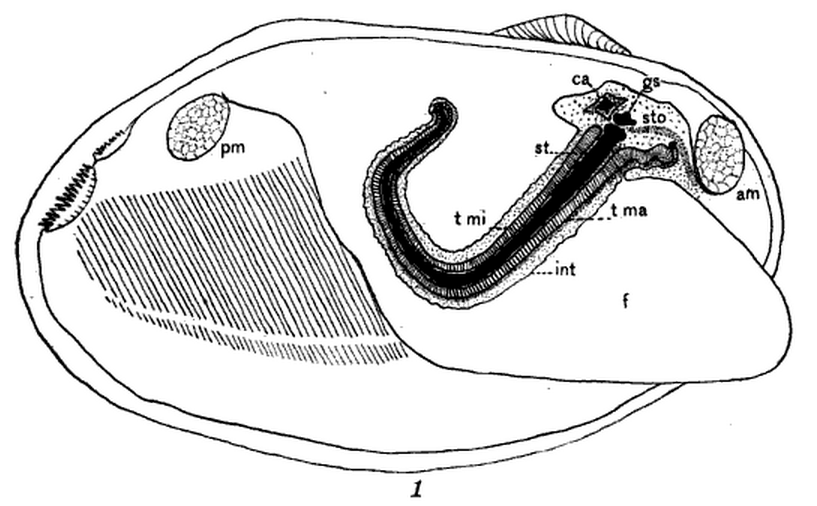
Mussel of the genus Anodonta, with style ("st") shown in black

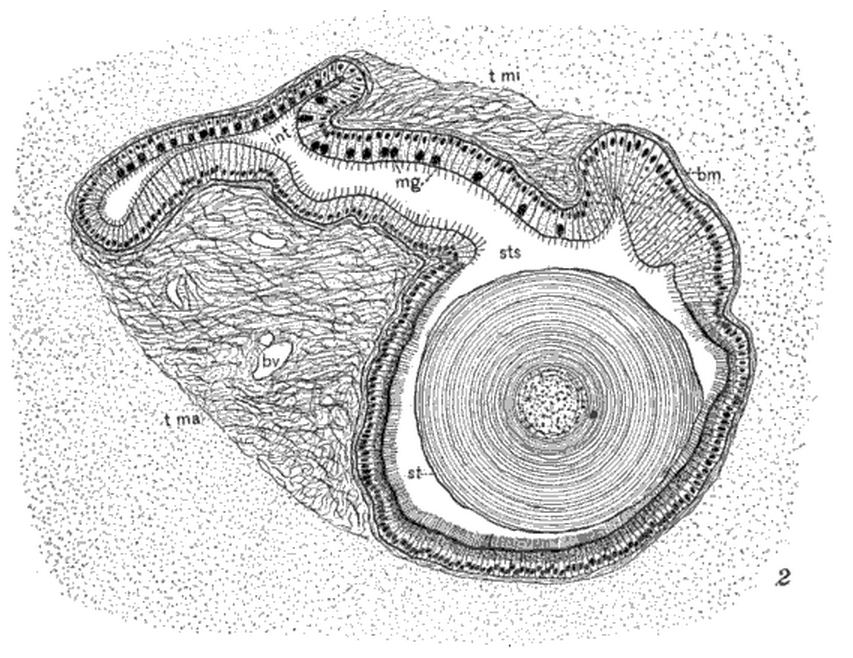
Lampsilis mussel, with style ("st") in cross-section

Among animals, there exists a single known example of an apparently freely rotating structure, though it is used for digestion rather than propulsion: the crystalline style of certain bivalves and gastropods. The style consists of a transparent glycoprotein rod which is continuously formed in a cilia-lined sac and extends into the stomach. The cilia rotate the rod, so that it becomes wrapped in strands of mucus. As the rod slowly dissolves in the stomach, it releases digestive enzymes. Estimates of the speed of rotation of the style in vivo vary significantly, and it is unclear if the style is rotated continuously or intermittently.

==== Microscopic ====
There are two known examples of molecular-scale rotating structures used by living cells. The first, ATP synthase, is a transmembrane enzyme used in the process of energy storage and transfer in all known organisms. The electron transport chain (ETC) establishes a proton gradient across the cell membrane in prokaryotes and the mitochondrial membrane in eukaryotes, such that there is a buildup of protons outside the cell (or in the intermembrane space of mitochondria). This allows for the energetically-favorable transport of protons across the membrane into the cytoplasm (or mitochondrial matrix) through special subunits of ATP synthase, whose subsequent rotation powers the conversion of adenosine diphosphate (ADP) to adenosine triphosphate (ATP)—the energy storage molecule—via the addition of one inorganic phosphate (P_{i}). The mechanism of rotation bears some similarity to the flagellar motors discussed below. ATP synthase is thought to have arisen by modular evolution, in which two subunits with their own functions have become associated and gained a new functionality.

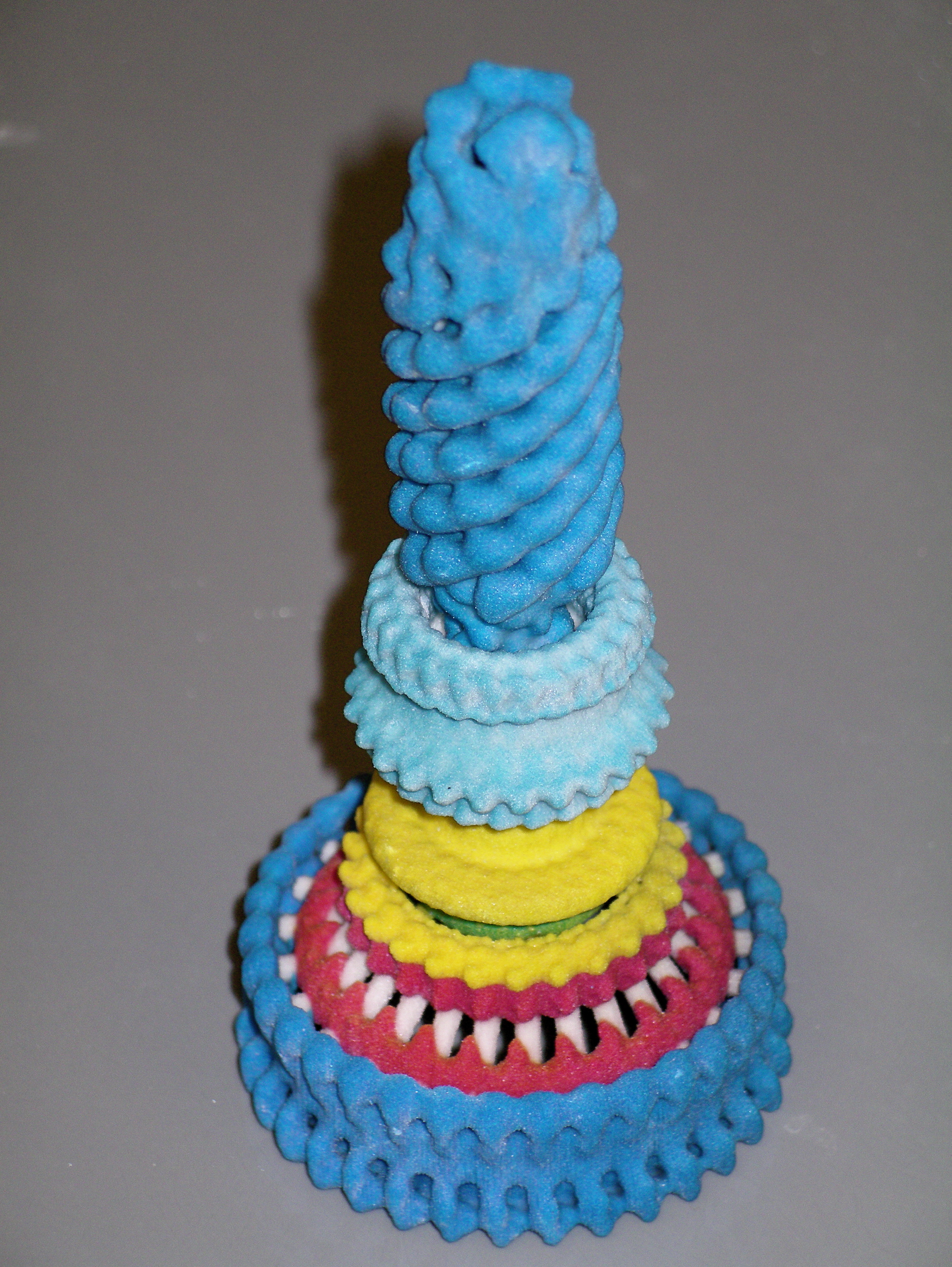
Model of the base of a bacterial flagellum, a true biological example of a freely rotating structure

The only known example of a biological "wheel" or "propeller"—a system capable of providing continuous propulsive torque about a fixed body—is the flagellum, a corkscrew-like tail used by single-celled prokaryotes for propulsion. The bacterial flagellum is the best known example. About half of all known bacteria have at least one flagellum; thus, given the ubiquity of bacteria, rotation may in fact be the most common form of locomotion used by living systems—though its use is restricted to the microscopic environment.

At the base of the bacterial flagellum, where it enters the cell membrane, a motor protein acts as a rotary engine. The engine is powered by proton motive force, i.e. by the flow of protons (hydrogen ions) across the bacterial cell membrane due to a concentration gradient set up by the cell's metabolism. (In species of the genus Vibrio, there are two kinds of flagella, lateral and polar, and some are driven by a sodium ion pump rather than a proton pump.) Flagella are quite efficient, allowing bacteria to move at speeds of up to 60 cell lengths per second. The rotary motor at the base of the flagellum is similar in structure to ATP synthase. Spirillum bacteria have helical bodies with flagella at either end, and they spin about the central axis of their bodies as they move through the water.

Archaea, a group of prokaryotes separate from bacteria, also feature flagella—known as archaella—driven by rotary motor proteins, which are structurally and evolutionarily distinct from bacterial flagella: whereas bacterial flagella evolved from the bacterial Type III secretion system, archaella appear to have evolved from type IV pili.

Some eukaryotic cells, such as the protist Euglena and animal sperm, possess a convergent, evolutionarily distinct flagellum-like structure known as a cilium or undulipodium. Unlike bacterial flagella however, these structures do not rotate at the base; rather, they bend in such a way that the tip whips in a circle.

Navicula, a type of diatom, may locomote using a band of free-flowing mucilage strands, in the manner of a tracked vehicle.

== Biological barriers to wheeled organisms ==
The absence of wheels in nature is frequently attributed to constraints imposed by biology: natural selection constrains the evolutionary paths available to species, and the processes by which multicellular organisms grow and develop may not permit the construction of a functioning wheel.

=== Evolutionary constraints ===
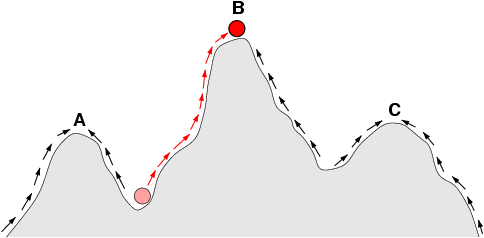
Illustration of a fitness landscape, indicating genetic flow of populations toward local optima A, B, and C. Potentially beneficial changes that require descent into a fitness "valley" are typically foreclosed by natural selection.

The processes of evolution can help explain why wheeled locomotion has not evolved in multicellular organisms, as a complex structure or system will not evolve if its incomplete form does not serve to propagate the organism's genes.

Adaptations are produced incrementally through natural selection, so major phenotypic changes will not usually spread within populations if they decrease the fitness of individuals. Although changes that do not affect fitness can spread through genetic drift, and detrimental changes can spread under some circumstances, large changes that require multiple steps will occur only if the intermediate stages increase fitness. Richard Dawkins describes the matter: "The wheel may be one of those cases where the engineering solution can be seen in plain view, yet be unattainable in evolution because it lies [on] the other side of a deep valley, cutting unbridgeably across the massif of Mount Improbable." In such a fitness landscape, wheels might sit on a highly favorable "peak", but the valley around that peak may be too deep or wide for the gene pool to migrate across by genetic drift or natural selection. Stephen Jay Gould notes that biological adaptation is limited to working with available components, commenting that "wheels work well, but animals are debarred from building them by structural constraints inherited as an evolutionary legacy".

Natural selection therefore explains why wheels are an unlikely solution to the problem of locomotion: a partially evolved wheel, missing one or more key features, would probably not impart an advantage to an organism. The exception to this is the flagellum, the only known example of a freely rotating propulsive system in biology; in the evolution of flagella, individual components were recruited from older structures, where they performed tasks unrelated to propulsion. The basal body that is now the rotary motor, for instance, might have evolved from a structure used by the bacterium to inject toxins into other cells. This recruitment of previously evolved structures to serve new functions is called exaptation.

Molecular biologist Robin Holliday has written that the absence of biological wheels argues against creationist or intelligent design accounts of the diversity of life, because an intelligent creator—free of the limitations imposed by evolution—would be expected to deploy wheels wherever they would be of use.

=== Developmental and anatomical constraints ===
Using human manufacturing processes, wheeled systems of varying complexity have proven fairly simple to construct, and issues of power transmission and friction have proven tractable. It is not clear, however, that the vastly different processes of embryonic development are suited to—or even capable of—producing a functioning wheel, for reasons described below. (Note: Although evolutionary and developmental constraints may preclude the possibility of a wheel as part of an organism, they do not preclude the use of foreign objects as "wheels", either instinctively (as in the case of the dung beetles discussed above), or through intelligently directed tool use (as in human technology).)

The greatest anatomical impediment to wheeled multicellular organisms is the interface between the static and rotating components of the wheel. In either a passive or driven case, (Note: Wheels can be considered to fall into two types: passive and driven. A passive wheel simply rolls freely over a surface, reducing friction when compared with dragging. A driven wheel is powered, and transmits energy to the surface to generate motion.) the wheel (and possibly axle) must be able to rotate freely relative to the rest of the machine or organism. Unlike animal joints, which have a limited range of motion, a wheel must be able to rotate through an arbitrary angle without ever needing to be "unwound". As such, wheels cannot be permanently attached to the rest of the machine or organism that uses them. There are several functional problems created by this requirement, though these may be partly surmountable.

==== Power transmission to driven wheels ====
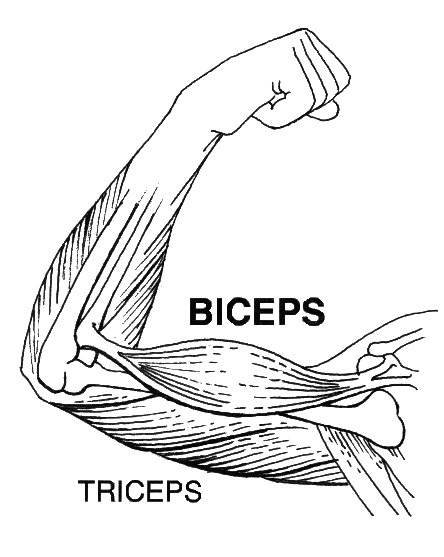
Skeletal muscle, attached at each end to bone

In the case of a driven wheel, a torque must be applied to generate the locomotive force. In human technology, this torque is generally provided by a motor, of which there are many types, including electric, piston-driven, turbine-driven, pneumatic, and hydraulic (torque may also be provided by human power, as in the case of a bicycle). In animals, motion is typically achieved by the use of skeletal muscles, which derive their energy from the metabolism of nutrients from food. Because these muscles are attached to both of the components that must move relative to each other, they are not capable of directly driving a wheel, and can only do so through a linkage. In addition, large animals cannot produce high accelerations, as inertia increases rapidly with body size.

==== Friction ====
Reducing friction is vital for minimizing wear on mechanical components and preventing overheating. As the relative speed of the components rises, and as the contact force between them increases, the importance of friction mitigation increases. Various types of bearing and/or lubricant may be used to reduce friction at the interface between two components. In biological joints such as the human knee, friction is reduced by means of cartilage with a very low friction coefficient, as well as lubricating synovial fluid, which has very low viscosity. Gerhard Scholtz of Humboldt University of Berlin asserts that a similar secreted lubricant or dead cellular material could allow a biological wheel to rotate freely.

==== Nutrient and waste transfer ====
Another potential problem that arises at the interface between wheel and axle (or axle and body) is the limited ability of an organism to transfer materials across this interface. If the tissues that make up a wheel are living, they will need to be supplied with oxygen and nutrients and have wastes removed to sustain metabolism. A typical animal circulatory system, composed of blood vessels, would not be able to provide transportation across the interface. In the absence of blood vessels, oxygen, nutrients, and waste products would need to diffuse across the interface, a process that would be greatly limited by the available partial pressure and surface area, in accordance with Fick's law of diffusion. For large multicellular animals, diffusion would be insufficient. Alternatively, a wheel could be composed of excreted, nonliving material such as keratin (of which hair and nails are composed).

== Disadvantages of wheels ==
In certain environments and situations, wheels incur mechanical and other disadvantages relative to limbed locomotion. These disadvantages suggest that, even barring the biological constraints discussed above, the absence of wheels in multicellular life may not be the "missed opportunity" of biology that it first seems. In fact, given the mechanical disadvantages and restricted usefulness of wheels when compared with limbs, the central question can be reversed: not "Why does nature not produce wheels?", but rather, "Why do human vehicles not make more use of limbs?" The use of wheels rather than limbs in most engineered vehicles can likely be attributed to the complexity of design required to construct and control limbs (see robot locomotion), rather than to a consistent functional advantage of wheels over limbs.

=== Efficiency ===
==== Rolling resistance ====
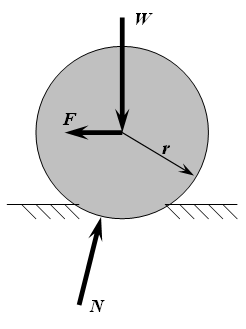
A hard wheel rolling on—and deforming—a soft surface, resulting in a reaction force N, with a component opposing the motion. (W is the weight of the wheel plus the supported portion of the vehicle; F is a propulsive force; r is the wheel radius.)

Although stiff wheels are more energy-efficient than other means of locomotion when traveling over hard, level terrain (such as paved roads), wheels are not especially efficient on soft terrain such as soil, because they are vulnerable to rolling resistance. In rolling resistance, a vehicle loses energy to the deformation of its wheels and the surface on which they are rolling. Smaller wheels are especially susceptible to this effect. Softer surfaces deform more and recover less than firm surfaces, resulting in greater resistance. Rolling resistance on medium to hard soil can be five to eight times greater than on concrete, and on sand it can be ten to fifteen times greater. While wheels deform the surface along their entire path, limbs induce only a small, localized deformation around the region of foot contact.

Rolling resistance led to wheels being abandoned throughout a large region at least once in history. During the time of the Roman Empire, wheeled chariots were common in the Middle East and North Africa. Yet when the Empire collapsed and its roads fell into disrepair, wheels fell out of favor with the local populations, who turned to camels to transport goods in the sandy desert climate. In his book Hen's Teeth and Horse's Toes, Stephen Jay Gould explains this curiosity of history, asserting that, in the absence of maintained roads, camels required less manpower and water than a wheeled cart pulled by oxen.

==== Efficiency of aquatic locomotion ====
When moving through a fluid, rotating systems carry an efficiency advantage only at extremely low Reynolds numbers (i.e. viscosity-dominated flows) such as those experienced by bacterial flagella, whereas oscillating systems have the advantage at higher (inertia-dominated) Reynolds numbers. Whereas ship propellers typically have efficiencies around 60% and aircraft propellers up to around 80% (achieving 88% in the human-powered Gossamer Condor), much higher efficiencies, in the range of 96–98%, can be achieved with an oscillating flexible foil like a fish tail or bird wing.

=== Traction ===
Wheels are prone to slipping—an inability to generate traction—on loose or slippery terrain. Slipping wastes energy and can potentially lead to a loss of control or becoming stuck, as with an automobile on mud or snow. This limitation of wheels can be seen in the realm of human technology: in an example of biologically inspired engineering, the forest machinery company Timberjack tested tree harvesters with six legs from 1999 to 2011. These walking machines allowed access to terrain too challenging for wheeled vehicles to navigate.

Tracked vehicles suffer less from slipping than wheeled vehicles, owing to their larger contact area with the ground—but they are less efficient and more mechanically complex.

=== Obstacle navigation ===
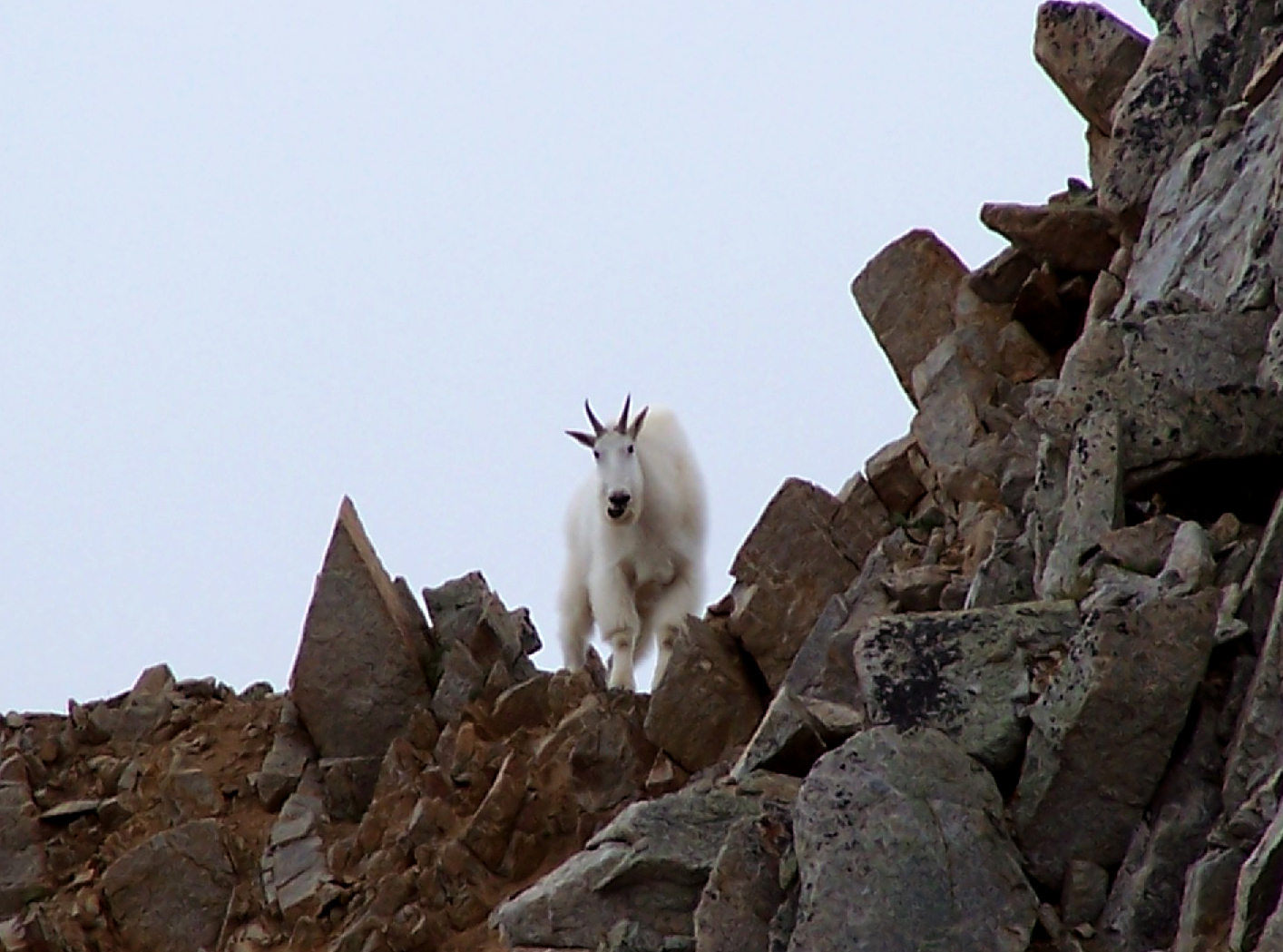
A mountain goat navigating a rocky landscape. Mountain goats illustrate the versatility of legs in challenging terrain.

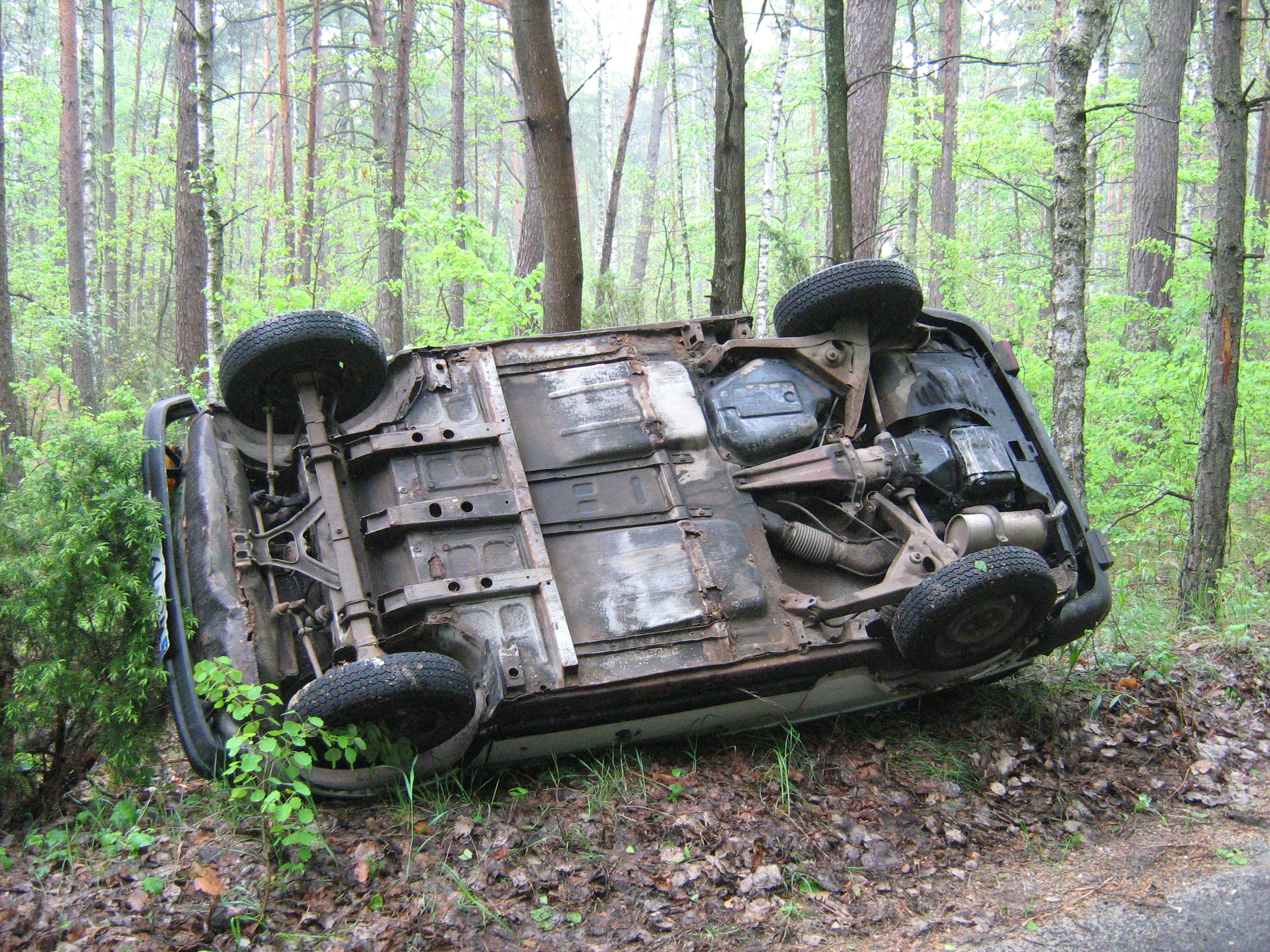
An overturned car. Without articulation, a vehicle in this position cannot right itself.

Work by vehicle engineer Mieczysław G. Bekker implies that the distribution of irregularities in natural terrains is log-normal; that is, small obstacles are far more common than larger ones. Thus, obstacle navigation is a challenge for locomotion in natural terrains at all size scales. The primary means of obstacle navigation are to go around obstacles and to go over them; each has its attendant challenges.

==== Going around ====
Anatomist Michael LaBarbera of the University of Chicago illustrates the poor maneuverability of wheels by comparing the turning radii of walking and wheelchair-using humans. As Jared Diamond points out, most biological examples of rolling are found in wide open, hard-packed terrain, including the use of rolling by dung beetles and tumbleweeds.

==== Going over ====
Wheels are poor at dealing with vertical obstacles, especially obstacles on the same scale as the wheel itself, and may be unable to climb vertical obstacles taller than about 40% of the wheel height. Because of this limitation, wheels intended for rough terrain require a larger diameter.

In addition, without articulation, a wheeled vehicle can become stuck on top of an obstacle, with the obstacle between the wheels, preventing them from contacting the ground. Limbs, in contrast, are useful for climbing and are equipped to deal with uneven terrain.

With unarticulated wheels, climbing obstacles will cause the body of a vehicle to tilt. If the vehicle's center of mass moves outside of the wheelbase (side to side) or axle track (front to back), the vehicle will be statically unstable, and will tend to tip over. At speed, a vehicle can become dynamically unstable—that is, it can be tipped over by an obstacle smaller than its static stability limit, or by excessive acceleration or tight turning. Suspension systems often mitigate the tendency of wheeled vehicles to overturn, but unlike fully articulated limbs, they do not provide any ability to recover from an overturned position.

=== Versatility ===
Limbs used by animals for terrestrial locomotion are frequently also used for other purposes, such as grasping, manipulating, climbing, branch-swinging, swimming, digging, jumping, throwing, striking, and grooming. Without articulation, wheels cannot perform these functions.

== In fiction and legend ==
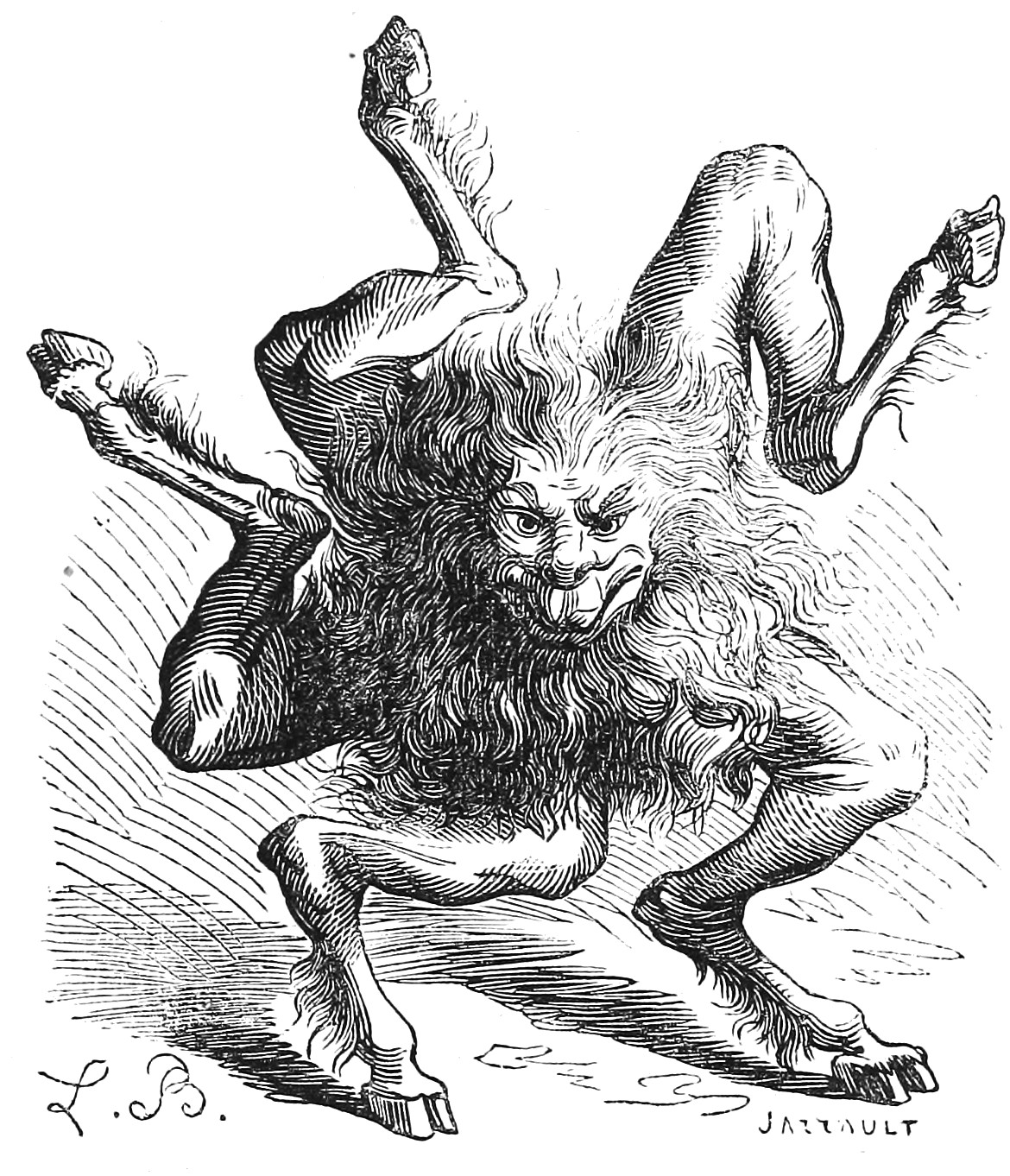
The demon Buer, from the 1863 edition of Dictionnaire Infernal

Legends and speculative fiction reveal a longstanding human fascination with rolling and wheeled creatures. Such creatures appear in mythologies from Europe, Japan, the United States, and Australia. Wheeled animal figurines were produced by pre-modern civilizations including those of pre-Columbian Mexico and archaic Greece.

=== Rolling creatures ===
The hoop snake, a creature of legend in the United States and Australia, is said to grasp its tail in its mouth and roll like a wheel towards its prey. Japanese culture includes a similar mythical creature, the Tsuchinoko. Buer, a demon mentioned in the 16th-century grimoire Pseudomonarchia Daemonum, was described and illustrated in Collin de Plancy's Dictionnaire Infernal as having radially-arranged arms on which it rolled.

The Dutch graphic artist M. C. Escher illustrated a rolling creature of his own invention in a 1951 lithograph. Rolling creatures are also featured in works by comic author Carl Barks, science fiction writers Fredric Brown, George R. R. Martin, and Joan Slonczewski, and in the Sonic the Hedgehog video game series.

=== Wheeled creatures ===
Toy animals with wheels dating from the Pre-Columbian era were uncovered by archaeologists in Veracruz, Mexico, in the 1940s. The indigenous peoples of this region did not use wheels for transportation prior to the arrival of Europeans.

Several 20th-century writers explored possibilities of wheeled creatures. L. Frank Baum's 1907 children's novel Ozma of Oz features humanoid creatures with wheels instead of hands and feet, called Wheelers. Their wheels are composed of keratin, which has been suggested by biologists as a means of avoiding nutrient and waste transfer problems with living wheels. Despite moving quickly on open terrain, the Wheelers are stymied by obstacles in their path that do not hinder creatures with limbs.

In the latter half of the 20th century, wheeled or wheel-using creatures featured in works by fantasy and science fiction writers including Clifford D. Simak, Piers Anthony, David Brin, K. A. Applegate, Philip Pullman, and writing partners Ian Stewart and Jack Cohen. Some of these works address the developmental and biomechanical constraints on wheeled creatures: Brin's creatures suffer from arthritic axles, and Pullman's Mulefa are not born with wheels, but roll on seed pods with which they coevolved.

== See also ==
- Biomimicry, which includes biologically inspired engineering
- Projectile use by living systems, another adaptation commonly associated with human technology
- Issus, one of many genera of planthoppers which use gear mechanisms to synchronize their legs while jumping
