= Prepilin peptidase =

Enzyme responsible for maturing type 4 pilins

Identifiers
- EC no.: 3.4.23.43
- CAS no.: 202833-59-8

Databases
- IntEnz: IntEnz view
- BRENDA: BRENDA entry
- ExPASy: NiceZyme view
- KEGG: KEGG entry
- MetaCyc: metabolic pathway
- PRIAM: profile
- PDB structures: RCSB PDB PDBe PDBsum
Search
- PMC: articles
- PubMed: articles
- NCBI: proteins

Type IV leader peptidase family (A24)

Identifiers
- Symbol: Peptidase_A24
- Pfam: PF01478
- InterPro: IPR000045
Available protein structures:
- Pfam: structures / ECOD
- PDB: RCSB PDB; PDBe; PDBj
- PDBsum: structure summary

Prepilin peptidase (EC 3.4.23.43) is an enzyme found in Type IV filament systems responsible for the maturation of the pilin. This enzyme catalyses the following chemical reaction

Typically cleaves a -Gly-Phe- bond to release an N-terminal, basic peptide of 5-8 residues from type IV prepilin, and then N-methylates the new N-terminal amino group, the methyl donor being S-adenosyl-L-methionine.

This enzyme is present on the surface of many species of bacteria. All known enzymes with this activity are of the MEROPS family A24.
