= Fimbrial usher protein =

Fimbrial Usher protein
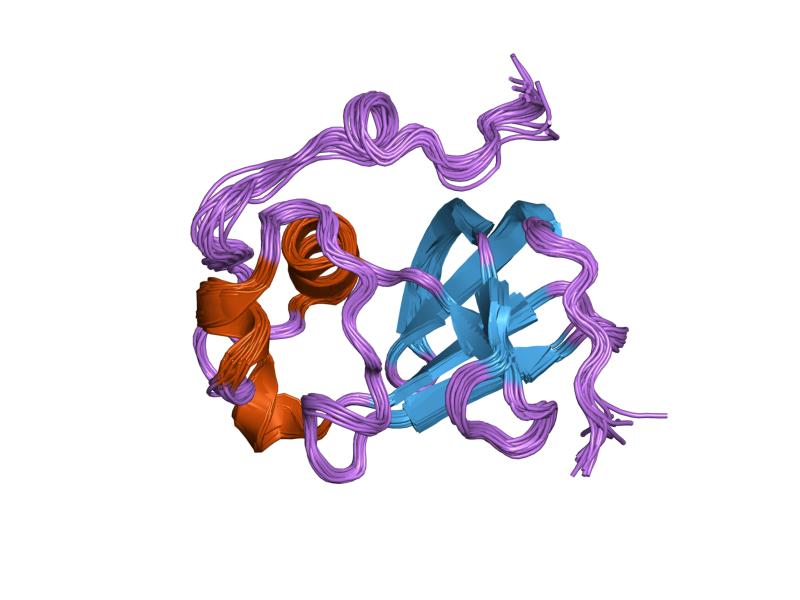
- Structure of the type 1 pilus assembly platform FimD(25-139).

Identifiers
- Symbol: Usher
- Pfam: PF00577
- InterPro: IPR000015
- PROSITE: PDOC00886
- TCDB: 1.B.11
- OPM superfamily: 187
- OPM protein: 4j3o
Available protein structures:
- PDB: IPR000015 PF00577 (ECOD; PDBsum)
- AlphaFold: IPR000015; PF00577

The fimbrial usher protein is involved in biogenesis of the pilus in Gram-negative bacteria. The biogenesis of some fimbriae (or pili) requires a two-component assembly and transport system which is composed of a periplasmic chaperone and a pore-forming outer membrane protein which has been termed a molecular 'usher'; this is the chaperone-usher pathway.

The usher protein has a molecular weight ranging from 86 to 100 kDa and is composed of a membrane-spanning 24-stranded beta barrel domain, reminiscent of porins, and of four periplasmic soluble domains: an N-terminal one of about 120 residues (NTD), a 'middle' domain of about 80 residues located as a soluble insertion within the beta barrel region of the sequence (plug domain) and two IG-like domains (each about 80 residues long) at the C-terminus (CTD1 and CTD2). Although the degree of sequence similarity of these proteins is not very high they share a number of characteristics. One of these is the presence of two pairs of disulfide bond-forming cysteines, the first one located in the NTD and the second in CTD2. The best conserved region of the sequence corresponds to the plug domain.
