= Pilus =

Proteinaceous hair-like appendage on the surface of bacteria

Schematic drawing of bacterial conjugation. 1- Donor cell produces pilus. 2- Pilus attaches to recipient cell, brings the two cells together. 3- The mobile plasmid is nicked and a single strand of DNA is then transferred to the recipient cell. 4- Both cells recircularize their plasmids, synthesize second strands, and reproduce pili; both cells are now viable donors.

A pilus (Latin for 'hair'; pl.: pili) is a hair-like cell-surface appendage found on many bacteria and archaea. The terms pilus and fimbria (Latin for 'fringe'; plural: fimbriae) can be used interchangeably, although some researchers reserve the term pilus for the appendage required for bacterial conjugation. All conjugative pili are primarily composed of pilin – fibrous proteins, which are oligomeric.

Dozens of these structures can exist on the bacterial and archaeal surface. Some bacteriophages (bacterial viruses) attach to receptors on bacterial pili at the start of their reproductive cycle.

Pili are antigenic. They are also fragile and constantly replaced, sometimes with pili of different composition, resulting in altered antigenicity. Specific host responses to old pili structures are not effective on the new structure. Recombination between genes of some (but not all) pili code for variable (V) and constant (C) regions of the pili (similar to immunoglobulin diversity). As the primary antigenic determinants, virulence factors and impunity factors on the cell surface of a number of species of gram-negative and some gram-positive bacteria, including Enterobacteriaceae, Pseudomonadaceae, and Neisseriaceae, there has been much interest in the study of pili as an organelle of adhesion and as a vaccine component. The first detailed study of pili was done by Brinton and co-workers who demonstrated the existence of two distinct phases within one bacterial strain: pileated (p+) and non-pileated)

== Types by function ==
A few names are given to different types of pili by their function. The classification does not always overlap with the structural or evolutionary-based types, as convergent evolution occurs.

=== Conjugative pili ===
Conjugative pili allow for the transfer of DNA between bacteria, in the process of bacterial conjugation. They are sometimes called "sex pili", in analogy to sexual reproduction, because they allow for the exchange of genes via the formation of "mating pairs". Perhaps the most well-studied is the F-pilus of Escherichia coli, encoded by the F sex factor.

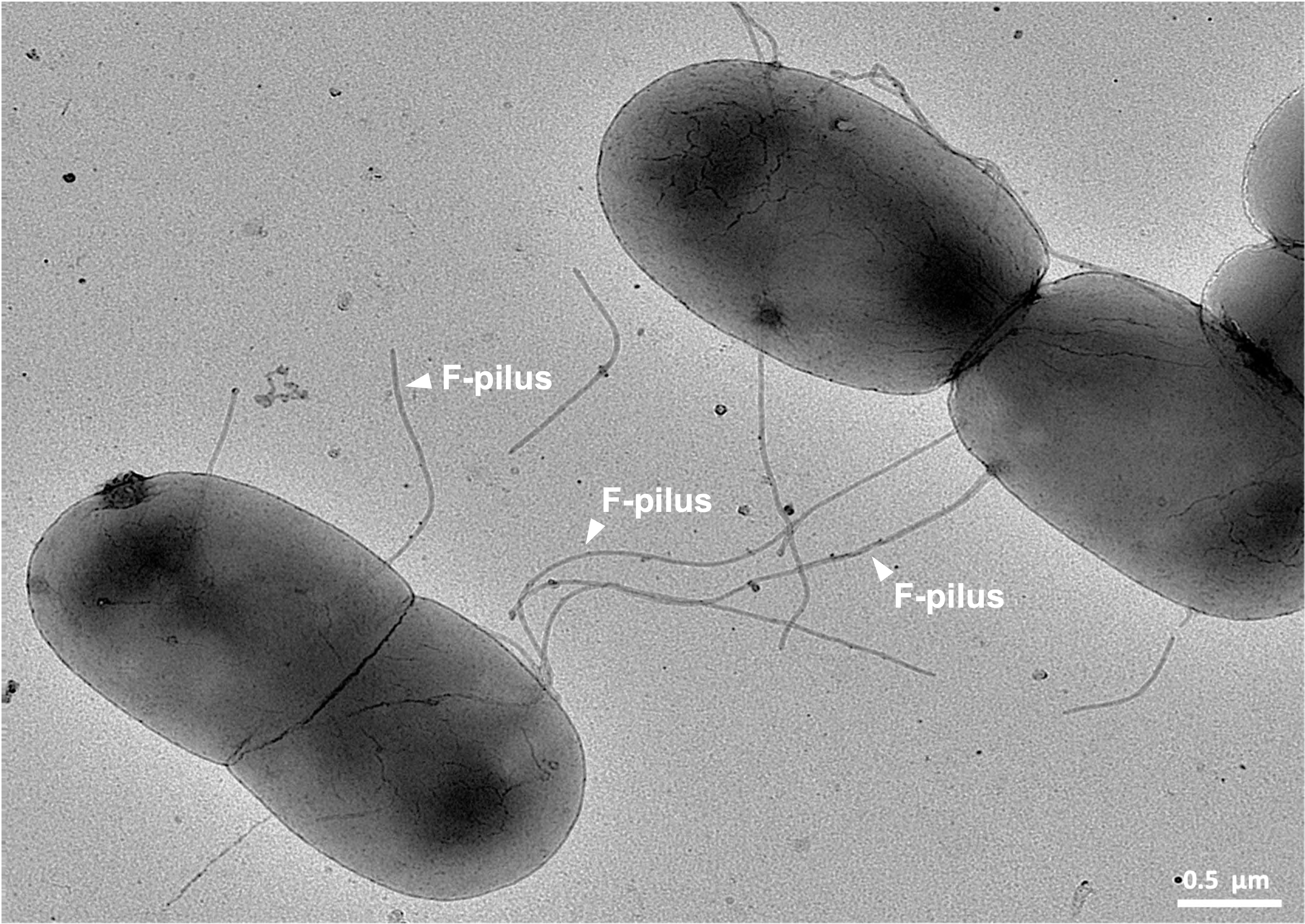
Escherichia coli undergoing conjugation. Bacteria produce long extracellular appendages called sex pili, which connect two neighbouring cells and serve as a physical conduit for transfer of DNA. Adapted from

A sex pilus is typically 6 to 7 nm in diameter. During conjugation, a pilus emerging from the donor bacterium ensnares the recipient bacterium, draws it in close, and eventually triggers the formation of a mating bridge, which establishes direct contact and the formation of a controlled pore that allows transfer of DNA from the donor to the recipient. Typically, the DNA transferred consists of the genes required to make and transfer pili (often encoded on a plasmid), and so is a kind of selfish DNA; however, other pieces of DNA are often co-transferred and this can result in dissemination of genetic traits throughout a bacterial population, such as antibiotic resistance. The connection established by the F-pilus is extremely mechanically and thermochemically resistant thanks to the robust properties of the F-pilus, which ensures successful gene transfer in a variety of environments. Not all bacteria can make conjugative pili, but conjugation can occur between bacteria of different species.

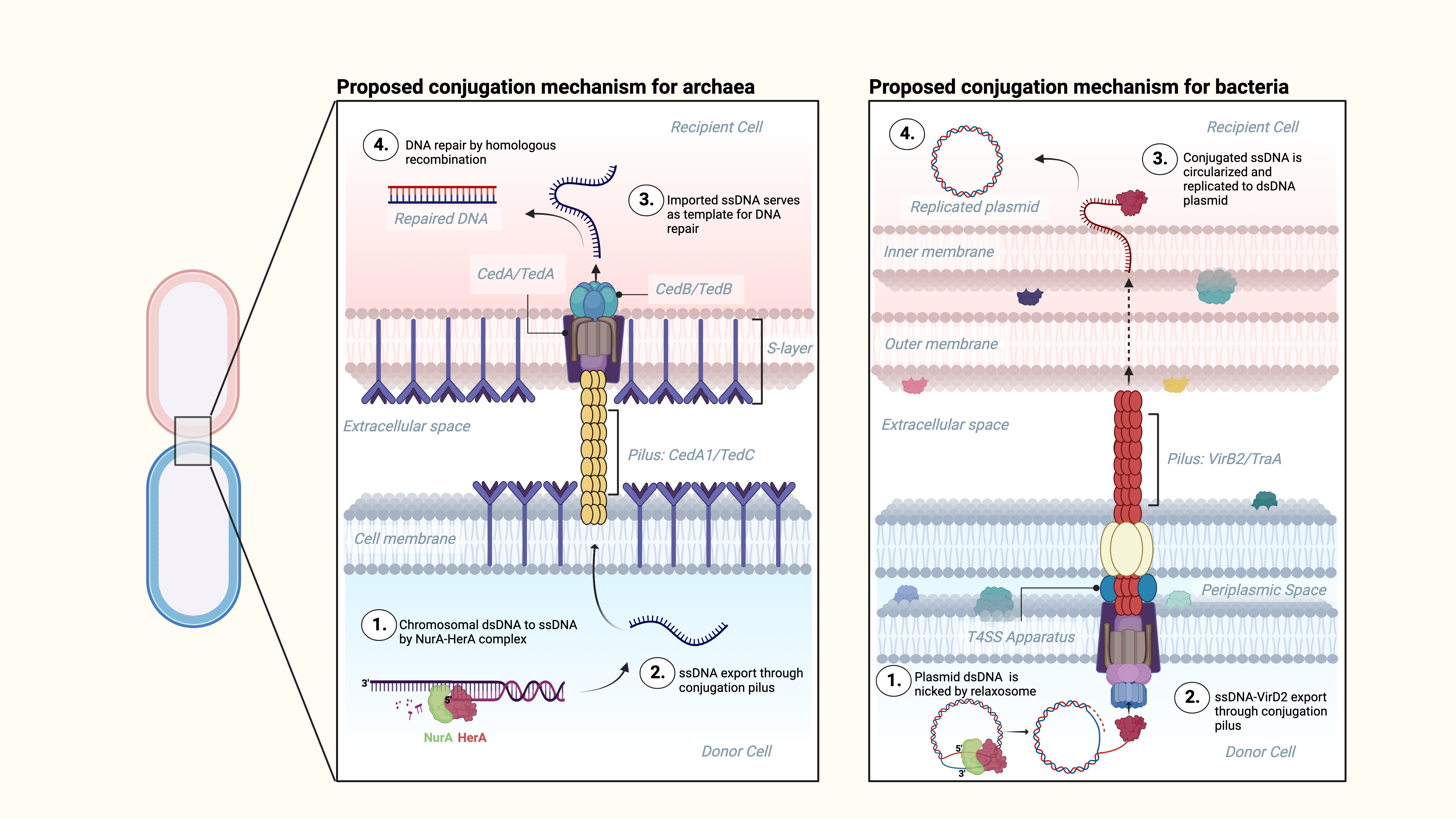
Proposed conjugation mechanisms between donor and recipient cells in archaea (left) and bacteria (right). The schematic shows how ssDNA substrates are generated by the HerA-NurA machinery in the donor archaeal cells and by the plasmid-encoded relaxosome in bacteria. The figure is reproduced from

Hyperthermophilic archaea encode pili structurally similar to the bacterial conjugative pili. However, unlike in bacteria, where conjugation apparatus typically mediates the transfer of mobile genetic elements, such as plasmids or transposons, the conjugative machinery of hyperthermophilic archaea, called Ced (Crenarchaeal system for exchange of DNA) and Ted (Thermoproteales system for exchange of DNA), appears to be responsible for the transfer of cellular DNA between members of the same species. It has been suggested that in these archaea the conjugation machinery has been fully domesticated for promoting DNA repair through homologous recombination rather than spread of mobile genetic elements.

=== Fimbriae ===
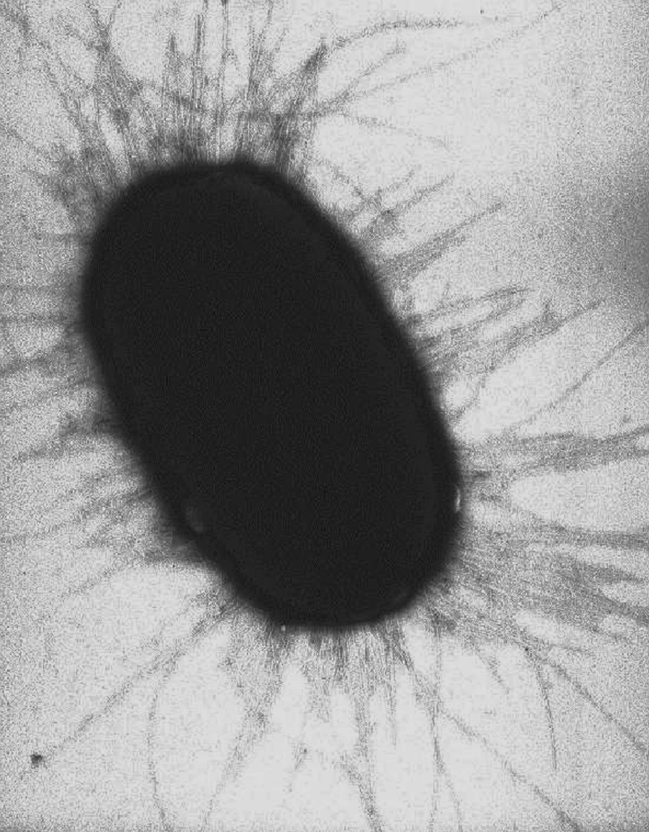
Escherichia coli.

Fimbria (Latin for 'fringe', pl.: fimbriae) is a term used for a short pilus, an appendage that is used to attach the bacterium to a surface, sometimes also called an "attachment pilus" or adhesive pilus. The term "fimbria" can refer to many different (structural) types of pilus. Indeed, many different types of pili have been used for adhesion, a case of convergent evolution. The Gene Ontology system does not treat fimbriae as a distinct type of appendage, using the generic pilus (GO:0009289) type instead.

This appendage ranges from 3–10 nanometers in diameter and can be as much as several micrometers long. Fimbriae are used by bacteria to adhere to one another and to adhere to animal cells and some inanimate objects. A bacterium can have as many as 1,000 fimbriae. Fimbriae are only visible with the use of an electron microscope. They may be straight or flexible.

Fimbriae possess adhesins which attach them to some sort of substratum so that the bacteria can withstand shear forces and obtain nutrients. For example, E. coli uses them to attach to mannose receptors.

Some aerobic bacteria form a very thin layer at the surface of a broth culture. This layer, called a pellicle, consists of many aerobic bacteria that adhere to the surface by their fimbriae. Thus, fimbriae allow the aerobic bacteria to remain both on the broth, from which they take nutrients, and near the air.

Fimbriae are required for the formation of biofilm, as they attach bacteria to host surfaces for colonization during infection. Fimbriae are either located at the poles of a cell or are evenly spread over its entire surface.

This term was also used in a lax sense to refer to all pili, by those who use "pilus" to specifically refer to sex pili.

== Types by assembling system or structure ==
=== Transfer ===
The Tra (transfer) family includes all known sex pili (as of 2010). They are related to the type IV secretion system (T4SS). They can be classified into the F-like type (after the F-pilus) and the P-like type. Like their secretion counterparts, the pilus injects material, DNA in this case, into another cell.

=== Type IV pili ===
Type IV Pilus Twitching Motility 1. Pre-PilA is made in the cytoplasm and moves into the inner membrane. 2. Pre-PilA is inserted into the inner membrane. 3. PilD, a peptidase, removes a leader sequence, thus making the Pre-PilA shorter and into PilA, the main building-block protein of Pili. 4. PilF, a NTP-Binding protein that provides energy for Type IV Pili Assembly. 5. The secretin protein, PilQ, found on the outer membrane of the cell is necessary for the development/extension of the pilus. PilC is the first proteins to form the pilus and are responsible for overall attachment of the pilus. 6. Once the Type IV Pilus attaches or interacts with what it needs to, it begins to retract. This occurs with the PilT beginning to degrade the last parts of the PilA in the pilus. The mechanism of PilT is very similar to PilF. 7. Degradation of the pilus into the components to be utilized and synthesized into PilA again.

Type IVa pilus machine architectural model

Some pili, called type IV pili (T4P), generate motile forces. The external ends of the pili adhere to a solid substrate, either the surface to which the bacterium is attached or to other bacteria. Then, when the pili contract, they pull the bacterium forward like a grappling hook. Movement produced by type IV pili is typically jerky, so it is called twitching motility, as opposed to other forms of bacterial motility such as that produced by flagella. However, some bacteria, for example Myxococcus xanthus, exhibit gliding motility. Bacterial type IV pili are similar in structure to the component proteins of archaella (archaeal flagella), and both are related to the Type II secretion system (T2SS); they are unified by the group of Type IV filament systems. Besides archaella, many archaea produce adhesive type 4 pili, which enable archaeal cells to adhere to different substrates. The N-terminal alpha-helical portions of the archaeal type 4 pilins and archaellins are homologous to the corresponding regions of bacterial T4P; however, the C-terminal beta-strand-rich domains appear to be unrelated in bacterial and archaeal pilins.

Genetic transformation is the process by which a recipient bacterial cell takes up DNA from a neighboring cell and integrates this DNA into its genome by homologous recombination. In Neisseria meningitidis (also called meningococcus), DNA transformation requires the presence of short DNA uptake sequences (DUSs) which are 9–10 monomers residing in coding regions of the donor DNA. Specific recognition of DUSs is mediated by a type IV pilin. Menningococcal type IV pili bind DNA through the minor pilin ComP via an electropositive stripe that is predicted to be exposed on the filament's surface. ComP displays an exquisite binding preference for selective DUSs. The distribution of DUSs within the N. meningitidis genome favors certain genes, suggesting that there is a bias for genes involved in genomic maintenance and repair. Bacteria of the Pasteurellaceae family, such as Haemophilus influenzae, possess uptake signal sequences in their DNA that are not related to those of Neisseriaceae but also mediate efficient transformation.

This family was originally identified as the "type IV fimbriae" by their appearance under the microscope. This classification survived as it happens to correspond to a clade. It has been shown that some archaeal type IV pilins can exist in four different conformations, yielding two pili with dramatically different structures. Remarkably, the two pili were produced by the same secretion machinery. However, which of the two pili is formed appears to depend on the growth conditions, suggesting that the two pili are functionally distinct.

=== Type 1 fimbriae ===
Another type are called type 1 fimbriae. They contain FimH adhesins at the "tips". The chaperone-usher pathway is responsible for moving many types of fimbriae out of the cell, including type 1 fimbriae and the P fimbriae.

=== Curli ===
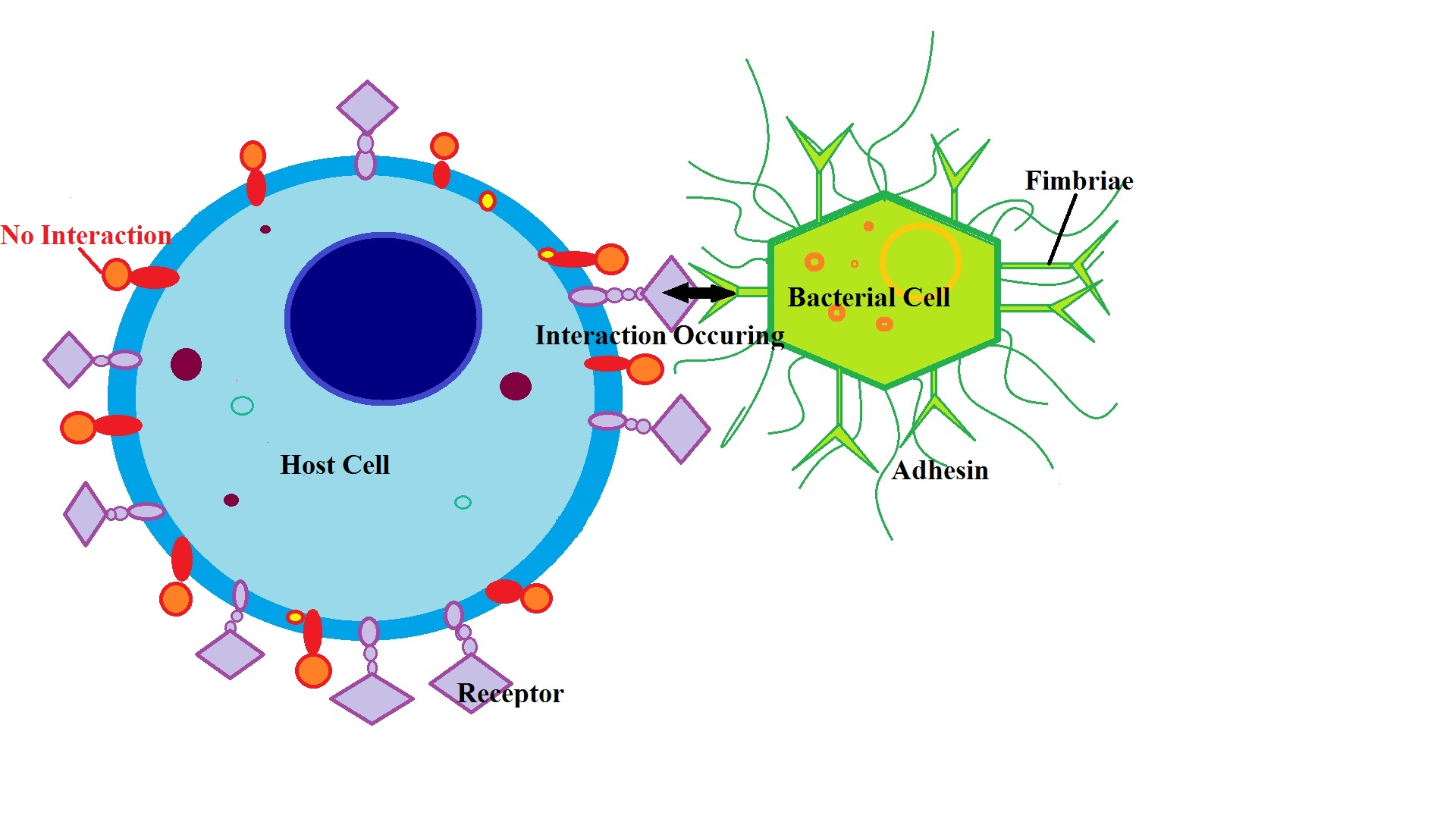
This figure depicts fimbriae adhesion. In this process the fimbriae of a bacterial cell (right) adhere to specific proteins, called receptors, found on the outer membrane of a host cell (left). They do this by a specific interaction between the receptors of the host cell and the perfectly matched adhesions found on the bacteria's fimbriae. This process of bacteria adhering to a host cell can result in the colonization of that host cell as more and more bacteria collect around it, and is integral to the continued survival of the bacteria, enabling them to infect tissues and entire organs.

"Gram-negative bacteria assemble functional amyloid surface fibers called curli." Curli are a type of fimbriae. Curli are composed of proteins called curlins. Some of the genes involved are CsgA, CsgB, CsgC, CsgD, CsgE, CsgF, and CsgG.

== Virulence ==
Pili are responsible for virulence in the pathogenic strains of many bacteria, including E. coli, Vibrio cholerae, and many strains of Streptococcus. This is because the presence of pili greatly enhances bacteria's ability to bind to body tissues, which then increases replication rates and ability to interact with the host organism. If a species of bacteria has multiple strains but only some are pathogenic, it is likely that the pathogenic strains will have pili while the nonpathogenic strains do not.

The development of attachment pili may then result in the development of further virulence traits. Fimbriae are one of the primary mechanisms of virulence for E. coli, Bordetella pertussis, Staphylococcus and Streptococcus bacteria. Their presence greatly enhances the bacteria's ability to attach to the host and cause disease. Nonpathogenic strains of V. cholerae first evolved pili, allowing them to bind to human tissues and form microcolonies. These pili then served as binding sites for the lysogenic bacteriophage that carries the disease-causing toxin. The gene for this toxin, once incorporated into the bacterium's genome, is expressed when the gene coding for the pilus is expressed (hence the name "toxin mediated pilus").

== See also ==
- Bacterial nanowires
- Flagellum
- Sortase
- P fimbriae
- PilZ domain
