= Archaellum =

Structure on the cell surface of many archaea that allows for swimming motility

The archaellum (pl.: archaella; formerly archaeal flagellum) is a unique structure on the cell surface of many archaea that allows for swimming motility. The archaellum consists of a rigid helical filament that is attached to the cell membrane by a molecular motor. This molecular motor – composed of cytosolic, membrane, and pseudo-periplasmic proteins – is responsible for the assembly of the filament and, once assembled, for its rotation. The rotation of the filament propels archaeal cells in liquid medium, in a manner similar to the propeller of a boat. The bacterial analog of the archaellum is the flagellum, which is also responsible for their swimming motility and can also be compared to a rotating corkscrew. Although the movement of archaella and flagella is sometimes described as "whip-like", this is incorrect, as only cilia from Eukaryotes move in this manner. Indeed, even "flagellum" (a word derived from the Latin for "whip") is a misnomer, as bacterial flagella also work as propeller-like structures.

Early studies on "archaeal flagella" identified several differences between archaella and flagella, although those differences were dismissed as a possible adaptation of archaella to the extreme ecological environments where archaea were at the time known to inhabit. When the first genomes of archaeal organisms were sequenced, it became obvious that archaea do not code for any of the proteins that are part of the flagellum, thus establishing that the motility system of archaea is fundamentally different from that of bacteria. In order to highlight the difference between these two organelles, the name archaellum was proposed in 2012 following studies that showed it to be evolutionarily and structurally different from the bacterial flagella and eukaryotic cilia.

Archaella are evolutionarily and structurally related to type IV filament systems (TFF). The TFF family seems to have originated in the last universal common ancestor, from where it diversified into archaella, Type IV Pili, Type II Secretion Systems, and the Tad pili.

== History ==
The first observations of what is now known to be the archaellum possibly occurred more than 100 years ago, even before the identification of the archaea. Archaea initially were identified in 1977 by Carl Woese and George E. Fox, and the three-domain of life (Eucarya, Archaea, and Bacteria) was proposed 10 years later. Also, during the 1970s, it was suggested for the first time that the proteins that compose the archaellum filament are distinct from those that assemble into the flagellum filament, although convincing data was still lacking. In the next decade, it became apparent that all archaella thus far studied possessed some "strange" features, such as the heavy presence of glycosylation in archaellins (that is, the monomers that form the archaella filament), a discovery helped by the cloning of the first archaellins. The "strangeness" of archaella was confirmed in the late 1990s, when the first genome sequences of archaeal species were published, namely those of Methanocaldococcus jannaschii in 1996, Archaeoglobus fulgidus in 1997, and Pyrococcus horikoshii in 1998. Although genes of archaellins were identified in all these three genomes, it was not possible to identify any gene homolog to those involved in flagella. Besides the evidence that the archaellum is not related to the flagellum, it was also during this time that the similarities between archaella and type iv pili (T4P) became clearer. One of the clearer evidences at the time was the observation that archaellins are synthesized in the cytoplasm as pre-proteins, with a signal peptide that needs to be cleaved prior to their insertion, presumably at the base of the growing archaellar filament. Flagellins, on the other hand, are not synthesized as pre-proteins; rather, these proteins are synthesized in a mature state, and they travel to the lumen of the flagellar filament (which is hollow) and assemble at its tip. Based on the similarities between archaella and type IV pili, in 1996 the first proposal for how archaella assemble was published. The next decade saw significant advances in the understanding of archaella. The enzyme responsible for the cleavage of the signal peptide was identified, and so were the other genes thought to be part of the archaella operon (now arl cluster). Interestingly, it was also during this period that the archaella from the euryarchaeon Halobacterium salinarum was shown to be powered by ATP hydrolysis. Although the similarities between T4P and archaella suggested that ATP hydrolysis could power this organelle, this discovery identified another major difference between archaella and flagella, as flagella are powered by a cation pump. This period of time also saw some of the initial research on chemotaxis in archaea, although the initial analyses of archaeal genomes had already suggested that these organisms possess a bacteria-like chemotaxis system. Despite having different motors, archaea and bacteria have remarkably similar chemotactic machineries.

During the 2010s, studies on the gene products of the arl operon established that many of the "accessory" proteins of the archaellum compose the motor of this organelle. At this time, it was possible to define a minimal set of components necessary for a mature and functional archaellum: the archaellin (either a single type or several), the prepilin peptidase which cleaves the signal peptide off from the pre-archaellin, and the proteins ArlC/D/E/F/G/H/I/J. In the phyla Crenarchaetoa, the genes for the proteins ArlC/D/E are not found; instead, archaellated members of this phylum code for ArlX, thought to have a similar function to ArlC/D/E. Based on all the evidence that had accumulated on the unique nature of archaella, in 2012 Ken Jarrell and Sonja-Verena Albers proposed that this organelle should not be called "archaeal flagella," but rather "archaella." Despite some initial criticism, the name is now widely accepted in the scientific community, and as of June 6, 2021, a PubMed search for the terms "archaella" or "archaellum" retrieves more results in recent years than the terms "archaeal flagella" or "archaeal flagellum."

Research of archaella continues, related to the basic biology of this organelle, to its ecological roles, and even investigating potential biotechnological applications. Some of the questions that remain open include: how is the expression of the arl operon regulated, what does the archaellum motor complex look like, and what is the role of some of the accessory components of the archaellum.

== Structure ==
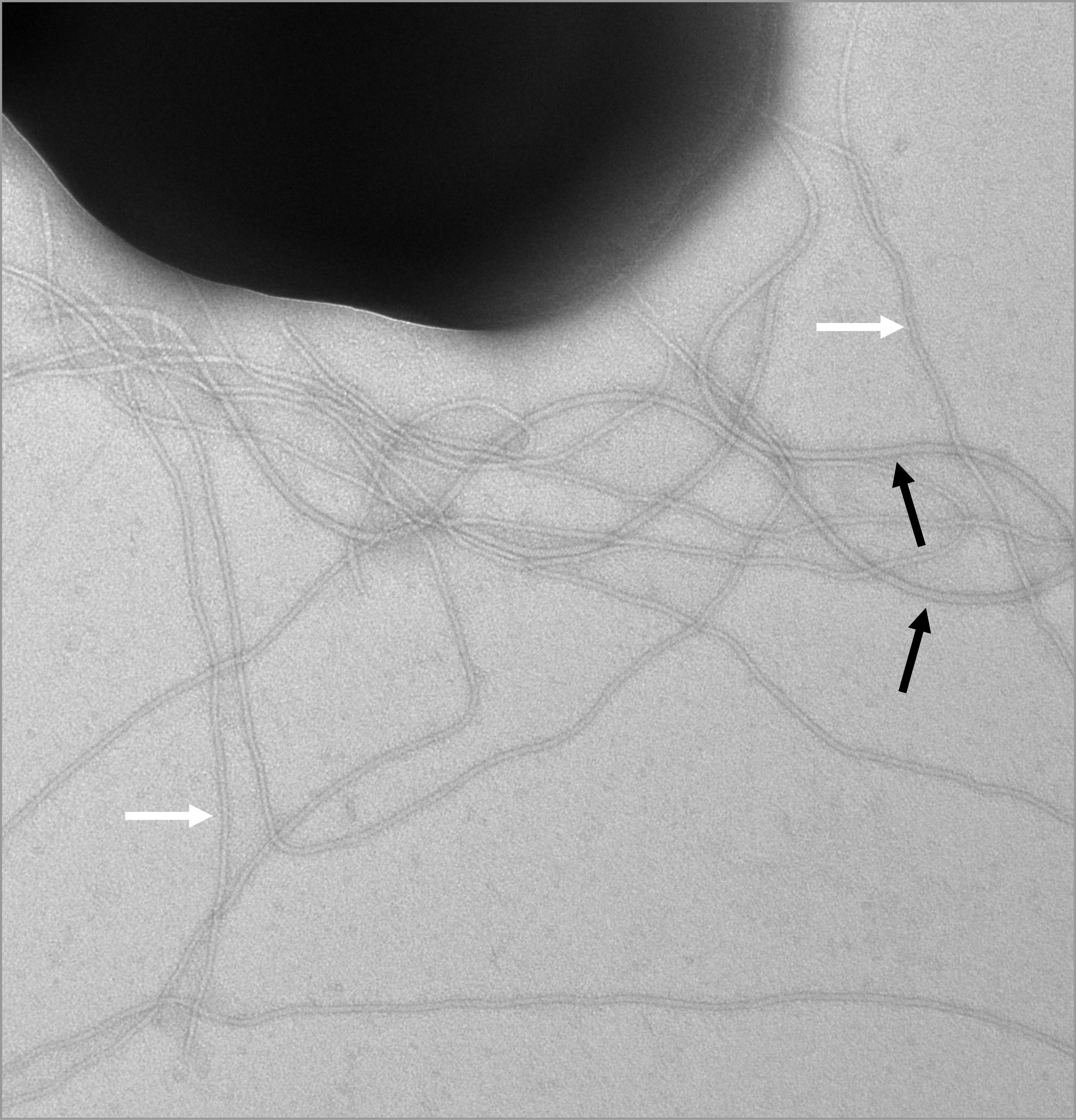
Electron micrographs of Sulfolobus acidocaldarius MW001 during normal growth. Indication of archaella (black arrows) and pili (white arrows). Negative staining with uranyl acetate.

=== Components ===
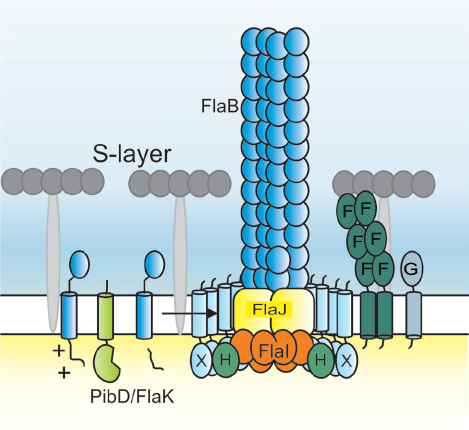
2015 model of the crenarchaeal archaellum.

Most proteins that make up the archaellum are encoded within one genetic locus. This genetic locus contains seven to 13 genes which encode proteins involved in either assembly or function of the archaellum. The genetic locus contains genes encoding archaellins (arlA and arlB) - the structural components of the filament - and motor components (arlI, arlJ, arlH). The locus furthermore encodes other accessory proteins (arlG, arlF, arlC, arlD, arlE and arlX). ArlX is only found in Crenarchaeota and ArlCDE (which can exist as individual proteins or as fusion proteins) in Euryarchaeotes. ArlX and ArlCDE are thought to have similar functions, and an unknown protein also is thought to fulfil the same function in Thaumarchaeota.

The archaellum operon used to be historically known as fla (from "flagellum"), but to avoid confusion with the bacterial flagellum and to be consistent with the remaining nomenclature (archaellum, archaellins), recently it has been proposed that it be renamed arl (archaellin-related genes). Consequently, the name of the genes is also different (e.g., flaJ is now arlJ). Therefore, in the specialized literature, both nomenclatures can be found, with the arl nomenclature being increasingly used since 2018.

Genetic analysis of different archaea revealed that each of these components is essential for assembly of the archaellum. The prepilin peptidase (called PibD in crenarchaeota and ArlK (formerly FlaK) in euryarchaeota) is essential for the maturation of the archaellins and generally is encoded elsewhere on the chromosome.

Functional characterization has been performed for ArlI, a Type II/IV secretion system ATPase super-family member and PibD/ArlK. ArlI forms a hexamer which hydrolyses ATP and most likely generates energy to assemble the archaellum and to power its rotation. PibD cleaves the N-terminus of the archaellins before they can be assembled. ArlH (PDB: 2DR3) has a RecA-like fold and inactive ATPase domains. This protein is a homolog of KaiC, a protein central for the regulation of the circadian rhythm in cyanobacteria. However, this function is not thought to be conserved; rather, ArlH also exhibits auto-phosphorylation, which seems to modulate its interaction with the ATPase ArlI. Despite arlH deletion resulting in loss of motility, rendering this protein essential for archaellation, its role in the archaellum motor remains unknown. ArlI and ArlH interact and, possibly together with the predicted membrane-protein ArlJ, form the central motor complex. In Crenarchaeota, this motor complex might be surrounded by a scaffold formed by a ring composed of ArlX. In Euryarchaeotes, cryo-electron tomograms suggest that ArlCDE form a structure underneath the motor, possibly in the order (from top to bottom) ArlJ-ArlI-ArlH-ArlCDE. ArlF and ArlG possibly form the stator of this complex, providing a static surface against which the rotor can move, and also anchoring the motor to the cell envelope, preventing the membrane from rupturing due to archaellar rotation. The structure of ArlCDE is unknown, but this complex (or variations thereof) have been shown to link the chemotaxis machinery and the archaellum in Haloferax volcanii.

=== Functional analogs ===
Despite the limited number of details presently available regarding the structure and assembly of archaellum, it has become increasingly evident from multiple studies that archaella play important roles in a variety of cellular processes in archaea. In spite of the structural dissimilarities with the bacterial flagellum, the main function thus far attributed for archaellum is swimming in liquid and semi-solid surfaces. Increasing biochemical and biophysical information has further consolidated the early observations of archaella mediated swimming in archaea. Like the bacterial flagellum, the archaellum also mediates surface attachment and cell-cell communication. However, unlike the bacterial flagellum, archaellum has not been shown to play a role in archaeal biofilm formation. In archaeal biofilms, the only proposed function is thus far during the dispersal phase of biofilm when archaeal cells escape the community using their archaellum to further initiate the next round of biofilm formation. Also, archaellum have been found to be able to have a metal-binding site.
