= Stator =

Stator may refer to:

== Engineering ==
In engineering, the stator is the stationary part of a rotary system, typically a motor/generator or fluid pump. For further information, see:

- Stator (electric machines), set of windings
- Stator (compressor), vanes to guide fluid flow
- Wicket gate (hydraulics), vanes that control water flow entering a turbine

== Biology ==
- Stator (beetle), a genus of seed beetles
