= Undulipodium =

Eukaryotic motile appendage that includes cilium and flagellum

An undulipodium or undulopodium (Greek: "swinging foot"; plural undulipodia) is a motile filamentous extension of eukaryotic cells, composed of a membrane protrusion held by a cytoskeletal structure called the axoneme. It is divided into cilia and flagella – which are differing terms for structurally identical organelles used on different types of cells, but are distinguished according to function and/or length, and usually corresponds to different waveforms of the organelles beating motion. The Gene Ontology database does not make a distinction between the two, referring to most undulipodia as "motile cilium", and to that in the sperm as sperm flagellum.

The name was coined to differentiate from the analogous structures present in prokaryotic cells, although "flagellum" would be a misnomer for the prokaryotic structure as they function more like propellers or corkscrews and, thus, do not "whip".

The usage of the term was early supported by Lynn Margulis, especially in support of endosymbiotic theory.

== Usage ==
In the 1980s, biologists such as Margulis advocated the use of the name "undulipodium", because of the apparent structural and functional differences between the cilia and flagella of prokaryotic and eukaryotic cells. They argued that the name "flagellum" should be restricted to prokaryotic organelles, such as bacterial flagella and spirochaete axial filaments. A distinction was drawn between "primary" cilia which function as sensory antennae, and ordinary cilia: it was argued that these were not undulipodia as they lacked a movement mechanism.

However, the term "undulipodium" is not generally endorsed by biologists, who argue that the original purpose of the name does not sufficiently differentiate the cilia and flagella of eukaryotes from those of prokaryotic cells. For example, the early concept was the trivial homology of the flagella of flagellates and the pseudopodia of amoebae. The consensus terminology is to use "cilium" and "flagellum" for all purposes.

== Gallery ==
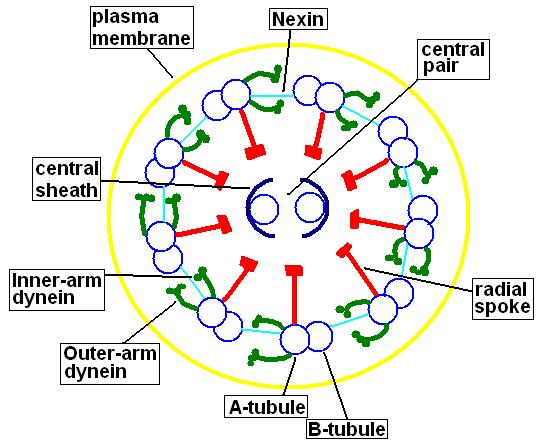
The axoneme, common structural motif of cilia and flagella.

Schematic of the cilium, with a cross section showing the axoneme.

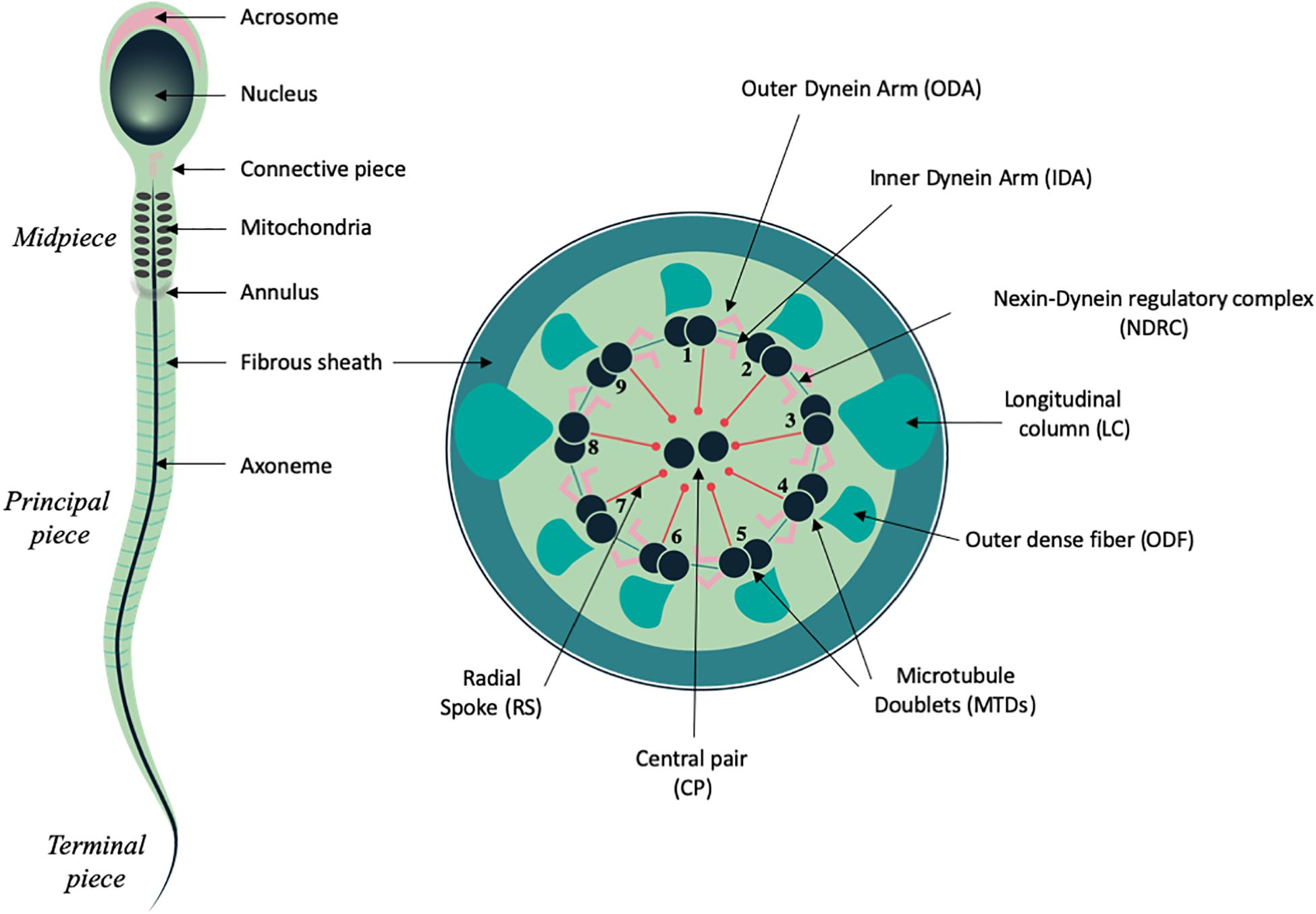
Schematic of mammalian spermatozoon and its flagellum.
