= A. communis =

A. communis may refer to:

- Abacetus communis, a ground beetle
- Aedes communis, the woodland snow pool mosquito, found in North America
- Afromyelois communis, a snout moth found in South Africa
- Agonopterix communis, a moth found in South Africa
- Alphitomorpha communis, a synonym of various powdery mildew fungi
- Alteromonas communis, a synonym of Marinomonas communis, a bacterium
- Amara communis, a species of beetle in the family Carabidae
- Amygdalus communis, a synonym for Prunus dulcis, the almond tree, a species of plant native to the Middle East
- Angochitina communis, a prehistoric chitinozoan
- Anicetus communis, a parasitic wasp species
- Anthoceros communis, a synonym of Phaeoceros carolinianus, a hornwort
- Anthomyia communis, a synonym of Euryomma peregrinum, a fly
- Apluda communis, a synonym of Apluda mutica, a plant found in Asia and islands in the Indian and Pacific Oceans
- Archimedes communis, a bryozoan
- Artocarpus communis, a synonym of Artocarpus altilis, the breadfruit tree
- Aspidoscelis communis, the Colima giant whiptail, a lizard found in Mexico
- Azoarcus communis, a bacterium

== See also ==
- Communis (disambiguation)
