= Thauera selenatis =

Scientific classification
- Domain: Bacteria
- Kingdom: Pseudomonadati
- Phylum: Pseudomonadota
- Class: Betaproteobacteria
- Order: Rhodocyclales
- Family: Zoogloeaceae
- Genus: Thauera
- Species: T. selenatis

Binomial name
- Thauera selenatis Macy et al. 1993

Type strain
- ATCC 55363, AX, AX39

Species of bacterium

Thauera selenatis is a gram-negative rod-shaped motile bacterium from the genus of Thauera with a single polar flagellum. Thauera selenatis has the ability to generate energy by respiring anaerobically with the enzyme selenate reductase.
