= Azonexus caeni =

Scientific classification
- Domain: Bacteria
- Kingdom: Pseudomonadati
- Phylum: Pseudomonadota
- Class: Betaproteobacteria
- Order: Rhodocyclales
- Family: Azonexaceae
- Genus: Azonexus
- Species: A. caeni

Binomial name
- Azonexus caeni Quan, Im & Lee, 2006

Species of bacterium

Azonexus caeni is a species of nitrogen-fixing bacteria. It is a root bacteria and together with Azonexus fungiphilus and Azonexus hydrophilus is one of the three species in the genus. It is Gram-negative, motile, non-spore-forming and slightly curved rod-shaped. Slu-05^{T} (=DSM 17719^{T}=KCTC 12530^{T}=CCBAU 10199^{T}) is the type strain.
