= Vincent Fischetti =

American bacteriologist and immunologist

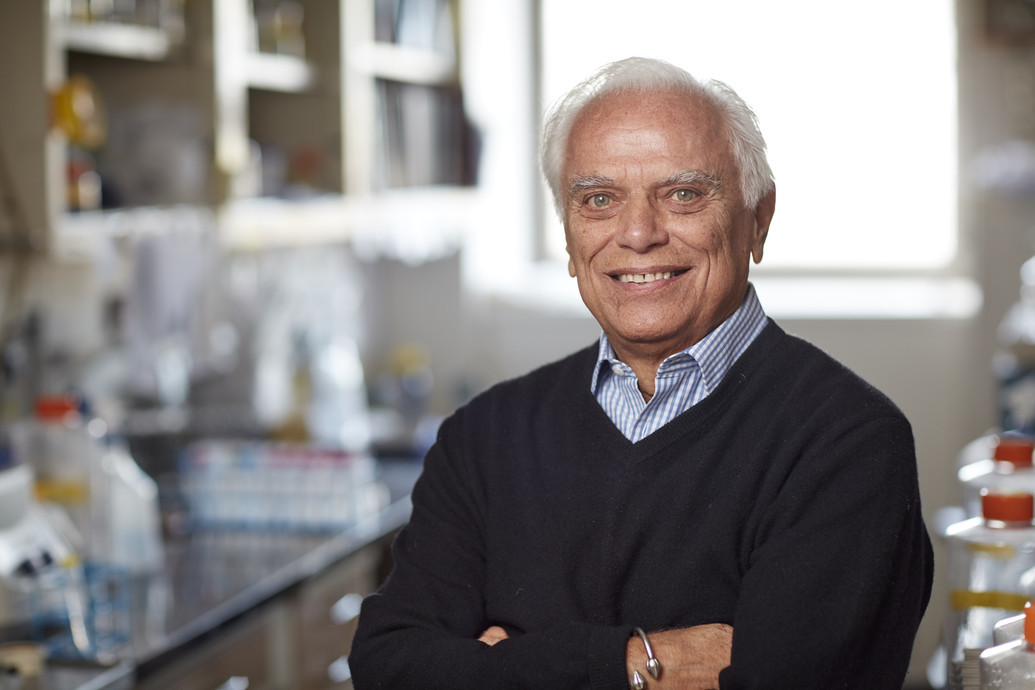
- Born: New York
- Citizenship: American
- Education: Wagner College (BS); Long Island University (MS); New York University School of Medicine (PHD)
- Known for: Phage Lysins as antimicrobials; Streptococcal M protein; Surface proteins on gram-positive bacteria; LPXTG anchor motif for surface proteins
- Awards: National Institutes of Health Merit Award, 1987 & 1997
- Scientific career
- Workplaces: Rockefeller University

Vincent A. Fischetti is an American microbiologist and immunologist, and Head of the Laboratory of Bacterial Pathogenesis and Immunology at Rockefeller University in New York City.

He is known for pioneering the use of phage lysins as therapeutics, and for being the first scientist to clone and sequence a surface protein on gram-positive bacteria, the M protein from Streptococcus pyogenes, determining its unique coiled-coil structure.

The Fischetti lab is the oldest continuous lab at Rockefeller, having been started in 1926, and was formerly headed by Homer Swift, Maclyn McCarty and Emil Gotschlich. Fischetti's primary areas of research are bacterial pathogenesis, bacterial genomics, immunology, virology, microbiology, and therapeutics.

== Research and contributions ==
Fischetti became an assistant professor at Rockefeller University in 1973, an associate professor 1978, and a full professor in 1990. During that time he served as the editor-in-chief of scientific journal, Infection and Immunity for 10 years and as section editor of the Journal of Immunology for 5 years.

In 1989, the journal Science published Fischetti's research on developing a Streptococcus pyogenes vaccine using an M-protein-based approach, which was effective at preventing general streptococcal infections in a mouse model. In the 1990s, the Fischetti lab was the first to clone and sequence the M protein, making it the first surface protein on gram-positive to be cloned and sequenced. This, combined with subsequent sequence research, (Note: Subsequent sequence data showed that the N-terminal region was the type-specific portion of the molecule and the C-terminal half was conserved among the many M proteins that are known. This latter information allowed for strains to be typed genetically based on the variability of the N-terminal sequence rather than the cumbersome and expensive serological typing scheme developed by Rebecca Lancefield.) had significant implications in vaccine development as well as streptococcal evolution.

His lab also discovered how surface proteins are anchored in the gram-positive bacterial cell wall, identifying the LPXTG sequence motif used as the anchoring signal. (Note: Specifically the LPSTG signal sequence used by the transpeptidase sortase) The lab discovered that this LPXTG motif was common among nearly all surface proteins on all gram-positive bacteria. This information is now critical for the development of anti-infectives and vaccines, and allows for the surface location of molecules on the bacterial cell to be predicted from sequence data. This helped lead to the identification of the anchor transpeptidase sortase by Olaf Schneewind, a former member of his lab.

By the late 1990s, Fischetti was exploring the impact of phage lysins, a novel form of antimicrobial ammunition produced by bacterial viruses, bacteriophage, as an alternative to antibiotics, and found it to be a novel solution to target specific antibiotic resistant bacteria. Other related research also explored the role of bacteriophage in disease and bacterial survival, showing that lysogenic bacteriophages are activated in vivo in the presence of a small molecule found in saliva. From his work on bacteriophage, Fischetti coined the term 'phages control the biosphere' in 2018.

In 2006, Fischetti was developing a lysin-based oral-nasal spray that can be delivered into the noses and mouths of hospital and nursing-home patients to prevent the impact of MRSA. Tests on mice infected with MRSA found their survival rate was significantly improved. One approach, a gram-negative lysin for Acinetobacter was licensed by Bioharmony Therapeutics, Inc in 2019. Other lysin patents were licensed by ContraFect, who used one to control staphylococcal infections.

Fischetti's work has also focused on the trigger for multiple sclerosis, and his lab alongside a lab at Weill Cornell observed that a gut-derived bacterial neurotoxin from Clostridium perfringens may be responsible for the MS trigger.

Some of Fischetti's popular research includes is 'aged eggnog made with raw eggs is safer than drinking it fresh'.

== Personal life ==
Fischetti grew up in West Hempstead, Long Island, NY, and enrolled at Wagner College on a pre-dental track, before majoring in bacteriology and public health. He graduated in 1962, and went on to receive his master's degree in microbiology from Long Island University in 1967 whilst working at the McCarthy lab at Rockefeller. He later received his Ph.D. degree in microbiology from New York University School of Medicine in 1970 under Alan Bernheimer. He later conducted postdoctoral research in the McCarty laboratory at Rockefeller University with John Zabriskie and Emil Gotschlich, focusing on streptococcal M protein, bacteriophage, and lysins. After receiving a Helen Hay Whitney Foundation fellowship, Fischetti spent a year at Albert Einstein College of Medicine under Barry Bloom, working on the isolation of cytokines, before returning to the McCarty lab at Rockefeller University to continue this work on M proteins. Being appointed Assistant Professor in 1974, his study of M protein was funded by the NIH for 37 years.

Fischetti is known for his role as the "father" of phage lysins as therapeutics, with his laboratory being the first to use phage lysins in animal models to prevent and treat infections. His studies on the M protein of Streptococcus pyogenes also revealed basic discoveries on the way surface proteins on gram-positive bacteria were anchored to the peptidoglycan. These findings had critical implications for vaccine development for gram-positive pathogens including streptococci and staphylococci.

Fischetti has co-edited the ASM book Gram-Positive Pathogens, now in its 3rd edition, and Streptococcus pyogenes: Basic Biology to Clinical Manifestations, in its 2nd edition. He is also a Fellow of the New York Academy of Sciences and the National Academy of Inventors with more than 40 notable patents.

== Technologies ==
Fischetti has also founded several biotech spinouts from his laboratory. These include M6 Pharmaceuticals in 1994, which developed mucosal anti-infective vaccines, and was reincarnated as Siga Technologies in 1995 and Astoria Biologica in 2021, a company developing therapies for Multiple Sclerosis. He has also been involved in the ContraFect Corporation, a biotech started by Robert Nowinski in 2008, which licensed the Fischetti laboratory lysin technology in 2009 and developed a Staphylococcal lysin to treat MRSA.
