= Zoogloea oleivorans =

Scientific classification
- Domain: Bacteria
- Kingdom: Pseudomonadati
- Phylum: Pseudomonadota
- Class: Betaproteobacteria
- Order: Rhodocyclales
- Family: Zoogloeaceae
- Genus: Zoogloea
- Species: Z. oleivorans

Binomial name
- Zoogloea oleivorans Farkas et al. 2015

Type strain
- DSM 28387,NCAIM B 02570

Species of bacterium

Zoogloea oleivorans is a gram-negative bacterium from the genus of Zoogloea. Its type strain was isolated from a filter for petroleum hydrocarbons from a site in Hungary.
