= Thauera butanivorans =

Scientific classification
- Domain: Bacteria
- Kingdom: Pseudomonadati
- Phylum: Pseudomonadota
- Class: Betaproteobacteria
- Order: Rhodocyclales
- Family: Zoogloeaceae
- Genus: Thauera
- Species: T. butanivorans

Binomial name
- Thauera butanivorans (ex Takahashi et al. 1980) Dubbels et al. 2009

Type strain
- Bu-B1211

Species of bacterium

Thauera butanivorans is a species of Gram-negative bacteria capable of growth on alkanes C2-C9, but not methane, as well as other organic substrates such as lactate, acetate, succinate and citrate. To grow on alkanes, this bacterium expresses a soluble di-iron monooxygenase closely related to soluble methane monooxygenase from methanotrophs.

It was originally described as Pseudomonas butanovora in 1980. Following 16S rRNA phylogenetic analysis, it was determined that P. butanovora belonged in the Thauera rRNA lineage, and is now referred to by its official name, Thauera butanivorans.
