= Propionivibrio pelophilus =

Scientific classification
- Domain: Bacteria
- Kingdom: Pseudomonadati
- Phylum: Pseudomonadota
- Class: Betaproteobacteria
- Order: Rhodocyclales
- Family: Rhodocyclaceae
- Genus: Propionivibrio
- Species: P. pelophilus

Binomial name
- Propionivibrio pelophilus Brune et al. 2002

Type strain
- asp66, CIP 106101, DSM 12018

Synonyms
- Propionibacter pelophilus

Species of bacterium

Propionivibrio pelophilus is a bacterium from the genus of Propionivibrio. Propionibacter pelophilus has been reclassified to Propionivibrio pelophilus.
