= Thauera phenylacetica =

Scientific classification
- Domain: Bacteria
- Kingdom: Pseudomonadati
- Phylum: Pseudomonadota
- Class: Betaproteobacteria
- Order: Rhodocyclales
- Family: Zoogloeaceae
- Genus: Thauera
- Species: T. phenylacetica

Binomial name
- Thauera phenylacetica Mechichi et al. 2002

Type strain
- B4P, CIP 110163, DSM 14743, Fuchs B4P, LMG 24873, LMG 26918

Species of bacterium

Thauera phenylacetica is a bacterium from the genus of Thauera.
