= Azospira restricta =

Scientific classification
- Domain: Bacteria
- Kingdom: Pseudomonadati
- Phylum: Pseudomonadota
- Class: Betaproteobacteria
- Order: Rhodocyclales
- Family: Rhodocyclaceae
- Genus: Azospira
- Species: A. restricta

Binomial name
- Azospira restricta Bae et al., 2007

Species of bacterium

Azospira restricta is a species of nitrogen-fixing bacteria. It is a root bacteria and together with Azospira oryzae they are the two species in the genus. It is Gram-negative, non-spore-forming, with straight to curved rod-shaped cells with a single polar flagellum. The type strain is SUA2T (=NRRL B-41660T=DSM 18626T=LMG 23819T).
