= Propionivibrio dicarboxylicus =

Scientific classification
- Domain: Bacteria
- Kingdom: Pseudomonadati
- Phylum: Pseudomonadota
- Class: Betaproteobacteria
- Order: Rhodocyclales
- Family: Rhodocyclaceae
- Genus: Propionivibrio
- Species: P. dicarboxylicus

Binomial name
- Propionivibrio dicarboxylicus Tanaka et al. 1991

Type strain
- CreMal1, DSM 5885, JCM 12339, JCM 7784

Species of bacterium

Propionivibrio dicarboxylicus is a gram negative, strictly anaerobic, non-spore-forming bacterium from the genus of Propionivibrio which was isolated from anaerobic mud from the Lake Kasumigaura in Japan.
