= Azoarcus olearius =

Scientific classification
- Domain: Bacteria
- Kingdom: Pseudomonadati
- Phylum: Pseudomonadota
- Class: Betaproteobacteria
- Order: Rhodocyclales
- Family: Zoogloeaceae
- Genus: Azoarcus
- Species: A. olearius

Binomial name
- Azoarcus olearius Chen et al., 2013

Species of bacterium

Azoarcus olearius is a species of bacteria. It is a nitrogen-fixing bacteria. Its cells are Gram-negative, motile and rod-shaped, surrounded by a thin capsule. Its type strain is DQS-4T (=BCRC 80407T =KCTC 23918T =LMG 26893T).
