= Thauera propionica =

Scientific classification
- Domain: Bacteria
- Kingdom: Pseudomonadati
- Phylum: Pseudomonadota
- Class: Betaproteobacteria
- Order: Rhodocyclales
- Family: Zoogloeaceae
- Genus: Thauera
- Species: T. propionica

Binomial name
- Thauera propionica Pal et al. 2018

Type strain
- KCTC 52820, VTCC-B-910017, strain KNDSS-Mac4

Species of bacterium

Thauera propionica is a Gram-negative and non-endospore-producing bacterium from the genus of Thauera which has been isolated from the Ganges river from Kanpur in India.
