= Rhodocyclus tenuis =

Scientific classification
- Domain: Bacteria
- Kingdom: Pseudomonadati
- Phylum: Pseudomonadota
- Class: Betaproteobacteria
- Order: Rhodocyclales
- Family: Rhodocyclaceae
- Genus: Rhodocyclus
- Species: R. tenuis

Binomial name
- Rhodocyclus tenuis Imhoff et al. 1984

Type strain
- ATCC 19134, ATCC 25093, CECT 5770, DSM 109, DSMZ 109, LMG 4367, LMG 7825, NBRC 102472, NCIMB 13340, Pfennig 2761, SMG 109

Synonyms
- Rhodospirillum tenue

Species of bacterium

Rhodocyclus tenuis is a bacterium from the genus Rhodocyclus. Rhodocyclus tenuis expresses the high potential iron-sulfur protein (HiPIP).
