= Dechloromonas agitata =

Scientific classification
- Domain: Bacteria
- Kingdom: Pseudomonadati
- Phylum: Pseudomonadota
- Class: Betaproteobacteria
- Order: Rhodocyclales
- Family: Azonexaceae
- Genus: Dechloromonas
- Species: D. agitata

Binomial name
- Dechloromonas agitata Achenbach et al. 2001

Type strain
- ATCC 700666; CKB; DSM 13637

Synonyms
- "Dechlorimonas agitatus" Bruce et al. 1999

Species of bacterium

Dechloromonas agitata is a dissimilatory perchlorate reducing bacterium (DRPB) that was isolated from paper mill waste. Strain CKB is a Gram negative, facultative anaerobe belonging to the Betaproteobacteria. The cells of strain CKB are highly motile and possess a single polar flagellum. D. agitata can couple the oxidation of several electron donors such as acetate, propionate, butyrate, lactate, succinate, fumarate, malate or yeast extract to electron acceptors such as oxygen, chlorate, perchlorate, ferrous iron, sulfide, and reduced humic substances like 2,6-anthrahydroquinone disulfonate. Unlike other perchlorate reducers, strain CKB cannot grow by nitrate reduction, which suggests that the pathways of nitrate and perchlorate reduction are distinct and unrelated, contrary to what previous research had shown.

== Biological perchlorate reduction by strain CKB ==
Strain CKB can reduce chlorate and perchlorate (collectively known as (per)chlorate) completely to chloride. The first step of the pathway involves the reduction of (per)chlorate to chlorite via the perchlorate reductase (Pcr) enzyme. Chlorite is then dismutated to molecular oxygen and chloride by the chlorite dismutase (Cld) enzyme. The produced oxygen can then be reduced to water by action of the enzyme cytochrome oxidase. The Cld enzyme, encoded by an 834 bp gene, is 277 amino acids long and includes a 26 amino acid leader peptide. Though expressed at basal levels under aerobic conditions, the cld gene was transcriptionally upregulated when strain CKB cells were grown in (per)chlorate. The Cld enzyme is of particular interest not only because it protects cells from toxic chlorite, but also because it is one of only a handful of systems capable of producing molecular oxygen.
