= Azoarcus indigens =

Scientific classification
- Domain: Bacteria
- Kingdom: Pseudomonadati
- Phylum: Pseudomonadota
- Class: Betaproteobacteria
- Order: Rhodocyclales
- Family: Zoogloeaceae
- Genus: Azoarcus
- Species: A. indigens

Binomial name
- Azoarcus indigens Reinhold-Hurek et al., 1993

Species of bacterium

Azoarcus indigens is a species of bacteria. It is a nitrogen-fixing bacteria associated with roots of Leptochloa fusca . Its cells are yellow-pigmented, straight to curved, gram-negative rods. Its type strain is VB32 (= LMG 9092).
