= Rhodocyclus purpureus =

Scientific classification
- Domain: Bacteria
- Kingdom: Pseudomonadati
- Phylum: Pseudomonadota
- Class: Betaproteobacteria
- Order: Rhodocyclales
- Family: Rhodocyclaceae
- Genus: Rhodocyclus
- Species: R. purpureus

Binomial name
- Rhodocyclus purpureus Pfennig, 1978

Species of bacterium

Rhodocyclus purpureus is a species of bacteria. Its cells are half-ring-shaped and ring-shaped before cell division; the half-rings being 0.6 to 0.7 μm wide and 2.5 to 3.0 μm long. Open or compact coils of variable length are also formed. It is facultatively aerobic and its type strain is “Ames” 6770 (= DSM 168).
