= Thauera aromatica =

Scientific classification
- Domain: Bacteria
- Kingdom: Pseudomonadati
- Phylum: Pseudomonadota
- Class: Betaproteobacteria
- Order: Rhodocyclales
- Family: Zoogloeaceae
- Genus: Thauera
- Species: T. aromatica

Binomial name
- Thauera aromatica Anders et al., 1995

Species of bacterium

Thauera aromatica is a species of bacteria. Its type strain is K 172^{T}.
