= Propionivibrio limicola =

Scientific classification
- Domain: Bacteria
- Kingdom: Pseudomonadati
- Phylum: Pseudomonadota
- Class: Betaproteobacteria
- Order: Rhodocyclales
- Family: Rhodocyclaceae
- Genus: Propionivibrio
- Species: P. limicola

Binomial name
- Propionivibrio limicola Brune et al. 2002

Type strain
- ATCC BAA-290, DSM 6832, GolChi1, JCM 12227

Species of bacterium

Propionivibrio limicola is a gram negative, oxidase- and catalase-negative anaerobic, fermentative, non-spore-forming, mesophilic, rod-shaped, motile bacterium from the genus of Propionivibrio which has the ability to degrade hydroaromatic compounds.
