= Thauera terpenica =

Scientific classification
- Domain: Bacteria
- Kingdom: Pseudomonadati
- Phylum: Pseudomonadota
- Class: Betaproteobacteria
- Order: Rhodocyclales
- Family: Zoogloeaceae
- Genus: Thauera
- Species: T. terpenica

Binomial name
- Thauera terpenica Foss and Harder 1999

Type strain
- 58Eu, CCUG 41527, CIP 105982, DSM 12139, Harder 58Eu

Species of bacterium

Thauera terpenica is a gram-negative mesophilic motile bacterium from the genus of Thauera.
