= Azospira oryzae =

Scientific classification
- Domain: Bacteria
- Kingdom: Pseudomonadati
- Phylum: Pseudomonadota
- Class: Betaproteobacteria
- Order: Rhodocyclales
- Family: Rhodocyclaceae
- Genus: Azospira
- Species: A. oryzae

Binomial name
- Azospira oryzae Reinhold-Hurek & Hurek, 2000

Species of bacterium

Azospira oryzae is a species of bacteria. It is a root bacteria, one of two species in the genus Azospira along with A. restricta.
