= Thauera mechernichensis =

Scientific classification
- Domain: Bacteria
- Kingdom: Pseudomonadati
- Phylum: Pseudomonadota
- Class: Betaproteobacteria
- Order: Rhodocyclales
- Family: Zoogloeaceae
- Genus: Thauera
- Species: T. mechernichensis

Binomial name
- Thauera mechernichensis Scholten et al. 1999

Type strain
- ATCC 700857, CCUG 48884, CIP 106978, DSM 12266, TL1

Species of bacterium

Thauera mechernichensis is a bacterium from the genus of Thauera which was isolated from a landfill leachate treatment plant.
