= Thauera chlorobenzoica =

Scientific classification
- Domain: Bacteria
- Kingdom: Pseudomonadati
- Phylum: Pseudomonadota
- Class: Betaproteobacteria
- Order: Rhodocyclales
- Family: Zoogloeaceae
- Genus: Thauera
- Species: T. chlorobenzoica

Binomial name
- Thauera chlorobenzoica Song et al. 2001

Type strain
- 3CB-1, ATCC 700723, CIP 107679, DSM 18012, KCTC 12933

Species of bacterium

Thauera chlorobenzoica is a species of bacterium from the genus Thauera. It was first described by Song et al. in 2001.
