= Azoarcus tolulyticus =

Scientific classification
- Domain: Bacteria
- Kingdom: Pseudomonadati
- Phylum: Pseudomonadota
- Class: Betaproteobacteria
- Order: Rhodocyclales
- Family: Zoogloeaceae
- Genus: Azoarcus
- Species: A. tolulyticus

Binomial name
- Azoarcus tolulyticus Zhou et al., 1995

Species of bacterium

Azoarcus tolulyticus is a species of bacteria. It is a nitrogen-fixing bacteria. It is notable for degrading toluene. Tol-4 is its type strain.
