= Azoarcus anaerobius =

Scientific classification
- Domain: Bacteria
- Kingdom: Pseudomonadati
- Phylum: Pseudomonadota
- Class: Betaproteobacteria
- Order: Rhodocyclales
- Family: Zoogloeaceae
- Genus: Azoarcus
- Species: A. anaerobius

Binomial name
- Azoarcus anaerobius Springer et al. 1998

Type strain
- DSM 12081, LuFRes1

Species of bacterium

Azoarcus anaerobius is a gram-negative, strictly anaerobic, catalase-negative, nitrate-reducing, rod-shaped bacterium from the genus Azoarcus.
