= Thauera aminoaromatica =

Scientific classification
- Domain: Bacteria
- Kingdom: Pseudomonadati
- Phylum: Pseudomonadota
- Class: Betaproteobacteria
- Order: Rhodocyclales
- Family: Zoogloeaceae
- Genus: Thauera
- Species: T. aminoaromatica

Binomial name
- Thauera aminoaromatica Mechichi et al. 2002

Type strain
- DSM 14742, Fuchs S2, LMG 26917

Species of bacterium

Thauera aminoaromatica is a Gram-negative, bacterium from the genus of Thauera. The complete genome of Thauera aminoaromatica is sequenced.
