= Rhodocyclus gelatinosus =

Scientific classification
- Domain: Bacteria
- Kingdom: Pseudomonadati
- Phylum: Pseudomonadota
- Class: Betaproteobacteria
- Order: Rhodocyclales
- Family: Rhodocyclaceae
- Genus: Rhodocyclus
- Species: R. gelatinosus

Binomial name
- Rhodocyclus gelatinosus Imhoff et al. 1984

Type strain
- ATCC 11169, ATCC 17011, ATH 2.2.1, BCRC 16415, CCRC 16415, CCTM 1912, CCUG 15841, CCUG 21977, CCUG 21990, CIP 107072, DSM 1709, HMSATH2.2.1, IAM 14808, IFO 16663, JCM 21318, KCTC 1373, LMG 4311, LMG 4438, NBRC 16663, NCIB 8290

Synonyms
- Rhodopseudomonas gelatinosa; Rubrivivax gelatinosus

Species of bacterium

Rhodocyclus gelatinosus is a gram-negative bacterium which has been transferred to Rubrivivax gelatinosus.
