= Thauera humireducens =

Scientific classification
- Domain: Bacteria
- Kingdom: Pseudomonadati
- Phylum: Pseudomonadota
- Class: Betaproteobacteria
- Order: Rhodocyclales
- Family: Zoogloeaceae
- Genus: Thauera
- Species: T. humireducens

Binomial name
- Thauera humireducens Yang et al. 2013

Type strain
- CCTCC M 2011497, KACC 16524, SgZ-1

Species of bacterium

Thauera humireducens is a gram-negative, non-spore-forming, humus-reducing, rod-shaped, bacterium from the genus of Thauera which was isolated from a microbial fuel cell.
