= Azoarcus buckelii =

Scientific classification
- Domain: Bacteria
- Kingdom: Pseudomonadati
- Phylum: Pseudomonadota
- Class: Betaproteobacteria
- Order: Rhodocyclales
- Family: Zoogloeaceae
- Genus: Azoarcus
- Species: A. buckelii

Binomial name
- Azoarcus buckelii Mechichi et al. 2002

Type strain
- DSM 14744, Fuchs U120, LMG 26916

Species of bacterium

Azoarcus buckelii is a bacterium from the genus Azoarcus.
