= Zoogloea ramigera =

Scientific classification
- Domain: Bacteria
- Kingdom: Pseudomonadati
- Phylum: Pseudomonadota
- Class: Betaproteobacteria
- Order: Rhodocyclales
- Family: Zoogloeaceae
- Genus: Zoogloea
- Species: Z. ramigera

Binomial name
- Zoogloea ramigera Itzigsohn 1868

Type strain
- ATCC 19544, CCUG 35205T, CCUG 35504, CIP 107119, Dondero 106, IAM 12136, IFO 15342, KCTC 2446, LMG 15100, LMG 17136, LMG 4432, NBRC 15342, NCIMB 10706, NCTC 13030, NRRL B-3691

Species of bacterium

Zoogloea ramigera is a gram-negative, aerobic bacterium from the genus of Zoogloea which occurs in organically enriched aqueous environments like activated sludges.
