= Azoarcus toluclasticus =

Scientific classification
- Domain: Bacteria
- Kingdom: Pseudomonadati
- Phylum: Pseudomonadota
- Class: Betaproteobacteria
- Order: Rhodocyclales
- Family: Zoogloeaceae
- Genus: Azoarcus
- Species: A. toluclasticus

Binomial name
- Azoarcus toluclasticus Song et al. 1999

Type strain
- ATCC 700605, MF63

Species of bacterium

Azoarcus toluclasticus is a gram negative bacterium from the genus Azoarcus.
