= Luciano Marraffini =

American microbiologist (born 1974)

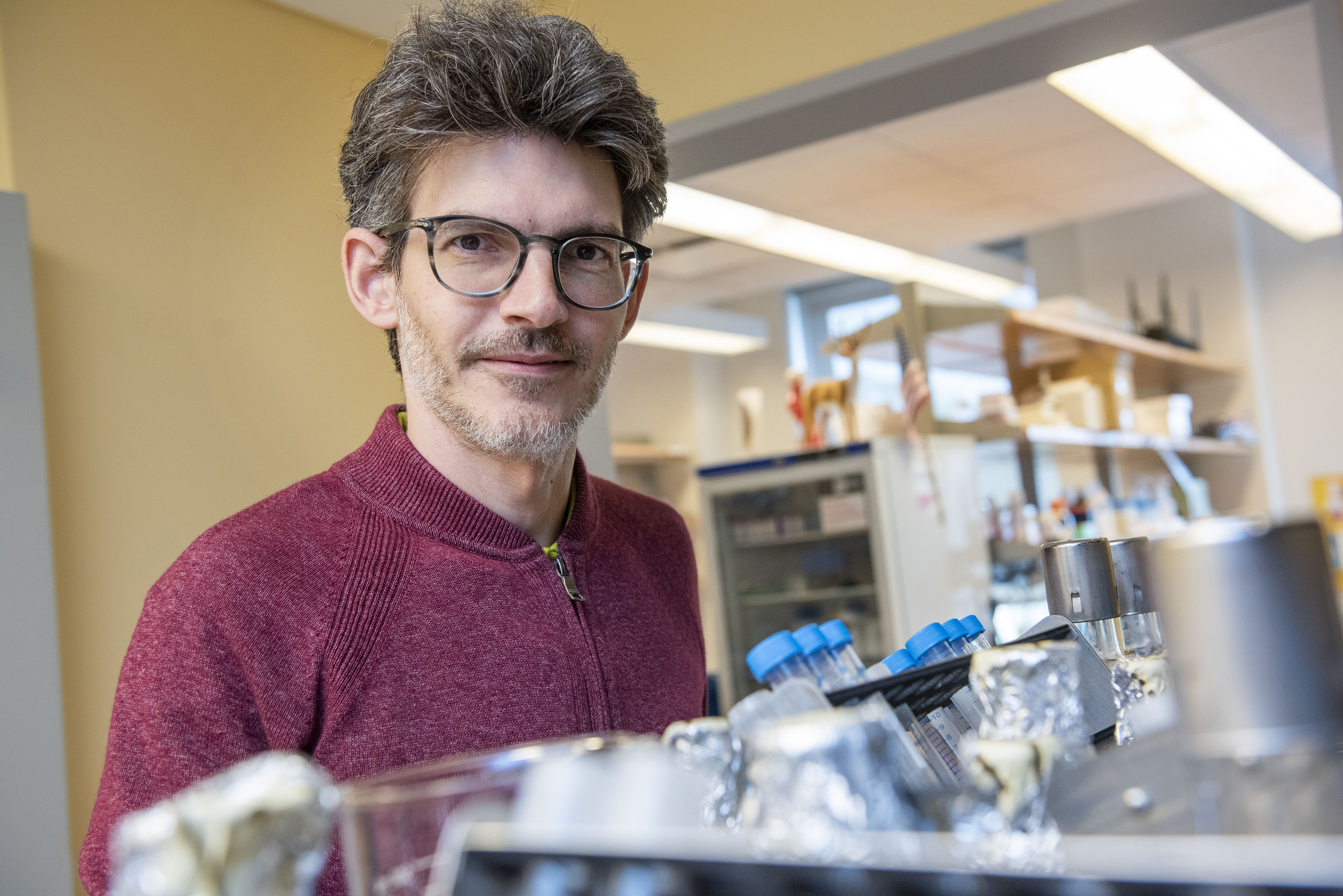
- Born: Luciano Angel Marraffini; July 17, 1974 (age 52); Rosario, Argentina
- Education: University of Rosario (Lic.); The University of Chicago (Ph.D.)
- Known for: CRISPR
- Awards: The Searle Scholars award (2011); The Hans Sigrist Prize (2015); The Earl and Thressa Stadtman Scholar Award (2016); National Institutes of Health Director's Pioneer Award (2017); Albany Medical Center Prize in Medicine and Biomedical Research (2017)
- Scientific career
- Fields: Microbiology; Biotechnology
- Workplaces: The Rockefeller University
- Thesis: Sortases, transpeptidases that anchor proteins to the envelope of Gram-positive bacteria (2007)
- Academic advisors: Olaf Schneewind
- Website: marraffini.rockefeller.edu

Luciano Angel Marraffini (born July 17, 1974) is an Argentine-American microbiologist. He is currently professor and head of the laboratory of bacteriology at The Rockefeller University. He is recognized for his work on CRISPR-Cas systems, being one of the first scientists to elucidate how these systems work at the molecular level.

== Early life and education ==
Marraffini was born and raised in Rosario, Argentina. He had two passions growing up: following his hometown soccer team Club Atlético Newell's Old Boys, and reading about science. Marraffini attended the Escuela Dante Alighieri high school and then entered the Facultad de Ciencias Bioquimicas y Farmaceuticas at the Universidad Nacional de Rosario to pursue a degree in Biotechnology. As an undergraduate he studied the biochemistry of plant ferredoxin-NADP⁺ reductases under the guidance of Dr. Eduardo Ceccarelli. Marraffini moved to Chicago for his doctoral studies with his wife and son. He earned a PhD from the University of Chicago investigating the biochemistry and biological role of sortase, a transpeptidase that links surface proteins to the envelope of Gram-positive bacteria, in the laboratory of Dr. Olaf Schneewind.. Currently, Marraffini lives with his wife and two children in New York City.

== Research ==
In 2008, Marraffini joined the laboratory of Erik J. Sontheimer at Northwestern University as a Jane Coffin Childs Memorial Fund for Medical Research Fellow. In the Sontheimer lab, Marraffini pioneered the study the molecular mechanisms of CRISPR-Cas systems. Using bacterial genetics, he determined that CRISPR-Cas immunity uses sequence-specific DNA destruction to neutralize invaders. This study was instrumental in understanding the molecular mechanisms of CRISPR immunity and in predicting the existence of RNA-programmable Cas nucleases, which are now widely used in gene editing.

In 2010, Marraffini joined the faculty of The Rockefeller University to continue studying CRISPR-Cas immunity. In 2012, he initiated a collaboration with Dr. Feng Zhang of the Broad Institute of MIT and Harvard that culminated in the development of the revolutionary CRISPR-Cas9 technologies to edit the genomes of bacteria and human cells. Currently, research in the Marraffini Lab focuses on the elucidation of the mechanisms of CRISPR-Cas immunity in bacteria.

== Awards and honors ==
For work in his own laboratory, he was honored with the Searle Scholars award in 2011, the NIH Director's New Innovator Award in 2012, the Hans Sigrist Prize from the University of Bern in 2015, the Earl and Thressa Stadtman Scholar Award from the American Society for Biochemistry and Molecular Biology (jointly with Georgios Skiniotis) in 2016, the NIH Director’s Pioneer Award, the Albany Medical Center Prize (jointly with Emmanuelle Charpentier, Jennifer Doudna, Francisco Mojica and Feng Zhang) in 2017, and the Vilcek Prize in Biomedical Science in 2024.

He was elected Fellow of the American Academy of Microbiology in 2017, Member of the National Academy of Sciences in 2019 and Member of the American Academy of Arts and Sciences in 2021. Marraffini was appointed investigator at the Howard Hughes Medical Institute (HHMI) in 2018 He received in 2025 a Carnegie Corporation of New York Great Immigrant Award
