= Zoogloea oryzae =

Scientific classification
- Domain: Bacteria
- Kingdom: Pseudomonadati
- Phylum: Pseudomonadota
- Class: Betaproteobacteria
- Order: Rhodocyclales
- Family: Zoogloeaceae
- Genus: Zoogloea
- Species: Z. oryzae

Binomial name
- Zoogloea oryzae Xie and Yokota 2006

Type strain
- A-7, CCTCC AB 2052005, IAM 15218, JCM 21672, NBRC 102407

Species of bacterium

Zoogloea oryzae is a nitrogen-fixing, catalase and oxidase-positiv, motile bacterium with a polar flagellum from the genus of Zoogloea which was isolated from the soil from a rice paddy field.
