= Zoogloea caeni =

Scientific classification
- Domain: Bacteria
- Kingdom: Pseudomonadati
- Phylum: Pseudomonadota
- Class: Betaproteobacteria
- Order: Rhodocyclales
- Family: Zoogloeaceae
- Genus: Zoogloea
- Species: Z. caeni

Binomial name
- Zoogloea caeni Shao et al. 2009

Type strain
- DSM 19389, EMB43, KCTC 22084

Species of bacterium

Zoogloea caeni is a gram-negative, catalase and oxidase-positive, facultatively aerobic, nitrogen-fixing, rod-shaped motile bacterium with a polar flagellum from the genus of Zoogloea which was isolated from activated sludge of a domestic wastewater treatment plant in Korea.
