= Transpeptidase =

Transpeptidase may refer to:

- DD-Transpeptidase, a bacterial enzyme that cross-links the peptidoglycan chains to form rigid cell walls
- Gamma-glutamyl transpeptidase, a liver enzyme
- D-Glutamyl transpeptidase
- A protein-sorting transpeptidase (e.g. sortase), that cleaves a C-terminal sorting signal from its target protein(s) and then covalently attaches the remainder to the cell surface.
