= Azoarcus toluvorans =

Scientific classification
- Domain: Bacteria
- Kingdom: Pseudomonadati
- Phylum: Pseudomonadota
- Class: Betaproteobacteria
- Order: Rhodocyclales
- Family: Zoogloeaceae
- Genus: Azoarcus
- Species: A. toluvorans

Binomial name
- Azoarcus toluvorans Song et al. 1999

Type strain
- ATCC 700604, DSM 15124, Td21

Species of bacterium

Azoarcus toluvorans is a bacterium from the genus Azoarcus.
