= Thauera linaloolentis =

Scientific classification
- Domain: Bacteria
- Kingdom: Pseudomonadati
- Phylum: Pseudomonadota
- Class: Betaproteobacteria
- Order: Rhodocyclales
- Family: Zoogloeaceae
- Genus: Thauera
- Species: T. linaloolentis

Binomial name
- Thauera linaloolentis Foss and Harder 1999

Type strain
- 47Lol, CCUG 41526, CIP 105981, DSM 12138, Harder 47Lol, IAM 15112, JCM 21573, NBRC 102519

Species of bacterium

Thauera linaloolentis is a gram-negative, mesophilic, motile bacterium from the genus of Thauera.

== Bibliography ==
- Robert Marmulla; Barbara Šafarić; Stephanie Markert; Thomas Schweder & Jens Harder (2016). "Linalool isomerase, a membrane-anchored enzyme in the anaerobic monoterpene degradation in Thauera linaloolentis 47Lol". BMC Biochemistry. 17: 6. doi:10.1186/s12858-016-0062-0. PMC 4791888. PMID 26979141.
