= Dechloromonas aromatica =

Scientific classification
- Domain: Bacteria
- Kingdom: Pseudomonadati
- Phylum: Pseudomonadota
- Class: Betaproteobacteria
- Order: Rhodocyclales
- Family: Azonexaceae
- Genus: Dechloromonas
- Species: D. aromatica

Binomial name
- Dechloromonas aromatica Cavalier-Smith 2002

Species of bacterium

Dechloromonas aromatica is a gram negative, facultative anaerobe bacterium from the genus Dechloromonas which was isolated of the Potomac River sludge in the mid-Atlantic coast of the United States and occurs in environment soil. Dechloromonas aromatica has the ability to degrade benzene anaerobically, reduce perchlorate and oxidize chlorobenzoate, toluene and xylene.
