= Zoogloea =

- Two strains of Zoogloea resiniphila. Wild type is on the left. The right is a strain unable to form floc.

Scientific classification
- Domain: Bacteria
- Kingdom: Pseudomonadati
- Phylum: Pseudomonadota
- Class: Betaproteobacteria
- Order: Rhodocyclales
- Family: Zoogloeaceae
- Genus: Zoogloea; Itzigsohn 1868

Type species
- Zoogloea ramigera

Species
- Zoogloea caeni Zoogloea oryzae Zoogloea ramigera Zoogloea resiniphila Zoogloea oleivorans

Genus of bacteria

Zoogloea, also known as zoöglœa or sewage fungus (though it is not a true fungus), is a genus of gram-negative, aerobic, rod-shaped bacterium that plays a role in wastewater treatment, the degradation of organic pollutants, and environmental bioremediation, from the family of Zoogloeaceae in the Rhodocyclales of the class Betaproteobacteria.

== Taxonomy and classification ==
The genus Zoogloea was first described in the 19th century but has undergone substantial taxonomic revisions. A pivotal study by Shin, Hiraishi, and Sugiyama utilized 16S rRNA gene sequencing to update the classification of the genus, thereby providing a clearer understanding of its diversity. This research allowed for better differentiation and classification of the various species within Zoogloea.

== Wastewater treatment ==
Zoogloea ramigera plays a role in sewage treatment plants by contributing to the breakdown of organic pollutants. It aids in the formation of biofilms, which offer protection under harsh environmental conditions. These biofilms are essential for the bacterium's effectiveness in bioremediation applications, as they enhance the bacterium’s ability to degrade organic pollutants in wastewater. By breaking down organic materials, Zoogloea helps purify wastewater, preventing the reintroduction of harmful pollutants into the environment.

== Bioremediation ==
Zoogloea oleivorans ability to degrade toluene, a toxic industrial pollutant. This capability significantly enhances its potential in environmental cleanups, particularly in bioremediation projects aimed at contaminated water, air, and other environments. Studies on this species have demonstrated its effectiveness in removing aromatic hydrocarbon pollutants under microaerobic conditions, further supporting its use in bioremediation.
