= Zoogloea resiniphila =

- Two strains of Zoogloea resiniphila. Wild type is on the left. The right is a strain unable to form floc.

Scientific classification
- Domain: Bacteria
- Kingdom: Pseudomonadati
- Phylum: Pseudomonadota
- Class: Betaproteobacteria
- Order: Rhodocyclales
- Family: Zoogloeaceae
- Genus: Zoogloea
- Species: Z. resiniphila

Binomial name
- Zoogloea resiniphila Mohn et al. 1999

Type strain
- ATCC 700687, CCUG 51656, CIP 106709, Dha-35, IAM 15294, JCM 21744, KCTC 12438

Species of bacterium

Zoogloea resiniphila is a bacterium from the genus of Zoogloea.
