= Dechloromonas denitrificans =

Scientific classification
- Domain: Bacteria
- Kingdom: Pseudomonadati
- Phylum: Pseudomonadota
- Class: Betaproteobacteria
- Order: Rhodocyclales
- Family: Azonexaceae
- Genus: Dechloromonas
- Species: D. denitrificans

Binomial name
- Dechloromonas denitrificans Horn et al. 2005

Type strain
- ATCC BAA-841, CIP 109443, DSM 15892, ED1

Species of bacterium

Dechloromonas denitrificans is a gram negative, N_{2}O-producing motile bacterium with a polar flagellum from the genus Dechloromonas which was isolated from the earthworm Aporrectodea caliginosa. Colonies of Dechloromonas denitrificans are yellowish colored.
