= Dechloromonas hortensis =

Scientific classification
- Domain: Bacteria
- Kingdom: Pseudomonadati
- Phylum: Pseudomonadota
- Class: Betaproteobacteria
- Order: Rhodocyclales
- Family: Azonexaceae
- Genus: Dechloromonas
- Species: D. hortensis

Binomial name
- Dechloromonas hortensis Wolterink et al. 2005

Type strain
- ATCC BAA-776, DSM 15637, MA-1

Species of bacterium

Dechloromonas hortensis is a gram negative, facultatively anaerobic, (per)chlorate-reducing, motile bacterium from the genus Dechloromonas.
