= Angelika Gründling =

Austrian microbiologist

- Born: 1972 (age 53–54)
- Education: University of Vienna
- Scientific career
- Workplaces: Imperial College London; University of Chicago; Harvard Medical School

Angelika Gründling (born 1972) is an Austrian microbiologist who is Professor of Molecular Microbiology at Imperial College London. Her research considers Staphylococcus aureus, nucleotide signalling and cell wall biosynthesis. She was elected a Fellow of the European Academy of Microbiology in 2018.

== Early life and education ==
Gründling completed her undergraduate studies at the University of Vienna. She conducted doctoral research with Ry Young at Texas A&M University. She moved to Harvard Medical School, where she studied the mobility of Listeria monocytogenes supported by an Erwin Schrödinger postdoctoral fellowship. There she investigated the motility of the flagellum in bacterial pathogen Listeria monocytogenes. Gründling moved to the Schneewind laboratory at the University of Chicago, where she investigated the cell wall of Staphylococcus aureus. As a postdoctoral researcher, she discovered the enzyme needed to make lipoteichoic acid, lipoteichoic acid synthase.

== Research and career ==
In 2007, Gründling joined Imperial College London, where she was promoted to Professor in 2015. Her group study the mechanisms that underpin the growth of Gram-positive bacterial pathogens. She studies the synthesis of cell walls and various pathways for nucleotide signalling in Staphylococcus aureus and Listeria monocytogenes.

She studied membrane function at Harvard Medical School. In particular, Gründling was interested in the mechanisms that underpin the growth of the bacterial membrane. Bacteria are composted of a phospholipid bilayer, mainly composed of phosphatidylglycerol, the enzymes of which have barely been characterised. She used genetic methods to unravel the mechanisms behind lipid transfer within the membrane and to identify the proteins required for membrane construction.

== Awards and honours ==
- 2009 American Society for Microbiology - Young Investigator Award
- 2010 Fellow of the Higher Education Academy
- 2014 Fellow of the Royal Society of Biology
- 2018 Fellow of the European Academy of Microbiology

== Selected publications ==
- Rebecca M Corrigan; James C Abbott; Heike Burhenne; Volkhard Kaever; Angelika Gründling (1 September 2011). "c-di-AMP is a new second messenger in Staphylococcus aureus with a role in controlling cell size and envelope stress". PLOS Pathogens. 7 (9) e1002217. doi:10.1371/JOURNAL.PPAT.1002217. ISSN 1553-7366. PMC 3164647. PMID 21909268.
- Matthew G Percy; Angelika Gründling (5 May 2014). "Lipoteichoic acid synthesis and function in gram-positive bacteria". Annual Review of Microbiology. 68: 81–100. doi:10.1146/ANNUREV-MICRO-091213-112949. ISSN 0066-4227. PMID 24819367.
- Rebecca M Corrigan; Angelika Gründling (1 July 2013). "Cyclic di-AMP: another second messenger enters the fray" (PDF). Nature Reviews Microbiology. 11 (8): 513–524. doi:10.1038/NRMICRO3069. ISSN 1740-1534. PMID 23812326.
