= 3,4-Dehydroadipyl-CoA semialdehyde dehydrogenase (NADP+) =

Class of enzymes

3,4-Dehydroadipyl-CoA semialdehyde dehydrogenase (NADP^{+})

Identifiers
- EC no.: 1.2.1.77

Databases
- IntEnz: IntEnz view
- BRENDA: BRENDA entry
- ExPASy: NiceZyme view
- KEGG: KEGG entry
- MetaCyc: metabolic pathway
- PRIAM: profile
- PDB structures: RCSB PDB PDBe PDBsum
Search
- PMC: articles
- PubMed: articles
- NCBI: proteins

3,4-Dehydroadipyl-CoA semialdehyde dehydrogenase (NADP^{+}) (EC 1.2.1.77, BoxD, 3,4-dehydroadipyl-CoA semialdehyde dehydrogenase) is an enzyme with systematic name 3,4-didehydroadipyl-CoA semialdehyde:NADP+ oxidoreductase. This enzyme catalyses the following chemical reaction

3,4-didehydroadipyl-CoA semialdehyde + NADP^{+} + H2O $\rightleftharpoons$ 3,4-didehydroadipyl-CoA + NADPH + H^{+}

This enzyme catalyses a step in the aerobic benzoyl-coenzyme A catabolic pathway in Azoarcus evansii and Burkholderia xenovorans.
