= Azoarcus communis =

Scientific classification
- Domain: Bacteria
- Kingdom: Pseudomonadati
- Phylum: Pseudomonadota
- Class: Betaproteobacteria
- Order: Rhodocyclales
- Family: Zoogloeaceae
- Genus: Azoarcus
- Species: A. communis

Binomial name
- Azoarcus communis Reinhold-Hurek et al., 1993

Species of bacterium

Azoarcus communis is a species of bacteria. It is a nitrogen-fixing bacteria. Its cells are yellow-pigmented, straight to curved, gram-negative rods. Its type strain is LMG 5514.
