= Exosortase =

Family of integral membrane proteins

Transmembrane exosortase (Exosortase_EpsH)

Identifiers
- Symbol: Exosortase_EpsH
- Pfam: PF09721
Available protein structures:
- PDB: PF09721 (ECOD; PDBsum)
- AlphaFold: PF09721

Exosortase refers to a family of integral membrane proteins that occur in Gram-negative bacteria that recognizes and cleaves the carboxyl-terminal sorting signal PEP-CTERM. The name derives from a predicted role analogous to sortase, despite the lack of any detectable sequence homology, and a strong association of exosortase genes with exopolysaccharide or extracellular polymeric substance biosynthesis loci. Many archaea have an archaeosortase, homologous to exosortases rather than to sortases. Archaeosortase A recognizes the signal PGF-CTERM, found at the C-terminus of some archaeal S-layer proteins. Following processing by archaeosortase A, the PGF-CTERM region is gone, and a prenyl-derived lipid anchor is present at the C-terminus instead.

Exosortase has not itself been characterized biochemically. However, site-directed mutagenesis work on archaeosortase A, an archaeal homolog of exosortases, strongly supports the notion of a Cys active site and convergent evolution with sortase family transpeptidases. In 2018, a study on Zoogloea resiniphila, a bacterium found in activated sludge wastewater treatment plants, showed that PEP-CTERM proteins (and by implication, exosortase as well) are essential to floc formation in some systems. More recently, Parrett, et al. {{PMID:40358234}} showed that cyanoexosortase B, the lone exosortase in the filamentous Cyanobacterium Nostoc punctiforme, is required both for a colony gliding behavior and for completion of the biosynthesis of the UV-absorbing pigment scytonemin. Both processes depend on PEP-CTERM proteins.
