= Benzoyl-CoA-dihydrodiol lyase =

Identifiers
- EC no.: 4.1.2.44

Databases
- IntEnz: IntEnz view
- BRENDA: BRENDA entry
- ExPASy: NiceZyme view
- KEGG: KEGG entry
- MetaCyc: metabolic pathway
- PRIAM: profile
- PDB structures: RCSB PDB PDBe PDBsum
Search
- PMC: articles
- PubMed: articles
- NCBI: proteins

Benzoyl-CoA-dihydrodiol lyase (EC 4.1.2.44, 2,3-dihydro-2,3-dihydroxybenzoyl-CoA lyase/hydrolase (deformylating), BoxC, dihydrodiol transforming enzyme, benzoyl-CoA oxidation component C) is an enzyme with systematic name 2,3-dihydro-2,3-dihydroxybenzoyl-CoA 3,4-didehydroadipyl-CoA semialdehyde-lyase (formate-forming). This enzyme catalyses the following chemical reaction

2,3-dihydro-2,3-dihydroxybenzoyl-CoA + H_{2}O $\rightleftharpoons$ 3,4-didehydroadipyl-CoA semialdehyde + formate

The enzyme is involved in the aerobic benzoyl-CoA catabolic pathway in Azoarcus evansii.
