= Benzoyl-CoA 2,3-dioxygenase =

Identifiers
- EC no.: 1.14.12.21

Databases
- IntEnz: IntEnz view
- BRENDA: BRENDA entry
- ExPASy: NiceZyme view
- KEGG: KEGG entry
- MetaCyc: metabolic pathway
- PRIAM: profile
- PDB structures: RCSB PDB PDBe PDBsum
Search
- PMC: articles
- PubMed: articles
- NCBI: proteins

Benzoyl-CoA 2,3-dioxygenase (EC 1.14.12.21, benzoyl-CoA dioxygenase/reductase, BoxBA, BoxA/BoxB system) is an enzyme with systematic name benzoyl-CoA,NADPH:oxygen oxidoreductase (2,3-hydroxylating). This enzyme catalyses the following chemical reaction

benzoyl-CoA + NADPH + H^{+} + O_{2} $\rightleftharpoons$ 2,3-dihydro-2,3-dihydroxybenzoyl-CoA + NADP^{+}

Benzoyl-CoA 2,3-dioxygenase is involved in aerobic benzoate metabolism in Azoarcus evansii.
