= Quadricoccus =

Quadricoccus may refer to:

- Quadricoccus (alga), a genus of algae in the order Chlorellales
- Quadricoccus (bacterium), a genus of bacteria in the order Rhodocyclales
