= Ferribacterium limneticum =

Scientific classification
- Domain: Bacteria
- Kingdom: Pseudomonadati
- Phylum: Pseudomonadota
- Class: Betaproteobacteria
- Order: Rhodocyclales
- Family: Azonexaceae
- Genus: Ferribacterium
- Species: F. limneticum

Binomial name
- Ferribacterium limneticum Cummings et al. 2000

Type strain
- ATCC 700589, CdA-1

Species of bacterium

Ferribacterium limneticum is a gram negative, obligately anaerobe, Fe(III)-reducing, motil bacterium from the genus Ferribacterium which was isolated from mining impacted lake sediments.
