= Naphthalene 1,2-dioxygenase =

Class of enzymes

Identifiers
- EC no.: 1.14.12.12
- CAS no.: 9074-04-8

Databases
- IntEnz: IntEnz view
- BRENDA: BRENDA entry
- ExPASy: NiceZyme view
- KEGG: KEGG entry
- MetaCyc: metabolic pathway
- PRIAM: profile
- PDB structures: RCSB PDB PDBe PDBsum
- Gene Ontology: AmiGO / QuickGO
Search
- PMC: articles
- PubMed: articles
- NCBI: proteins

Naphthalene 1,2-dioxygenase (EC 1.14.12.12) is an enzyme that catalyzes the chemical reaction

naphthalene
+ NADH
O_{2} + H^{+}
cis 1,2 dihydroxy-1,2-dihydronaphthalene
+ NAD^{+}

The four substrates of this enzyme are naphthalene, reduced nicotinamide adenine dinucleotide (NADH), oxygen and a proton. Its products are (1R, 2S)-cis 1,2 dihydroxy-1,2-dihydronaphthalene and oxidised NAD^{+}.

This enzyme is an oxidoreductase that uses molecular oxygen as oxidant and incorporates both its atoms into the starting material. The systematic name of this enzyme class is naphthalene,NADH:oxygen oxidoreductase (1,2-hydroxylating). Other names in common use include naphthalene dioxygenase, and naphthalene oxygenase. The enzyme is an iron–sulfur protein that contains ferredoxin and participates in metabolic pathways that degrade polycyclic aromatic hydrocarbons and ethylbenzene.

== Structural studies ==
As of late 2007, 18 structures have been solved for this class of enzymes, with PDB accession codes 1EG9, 1NDO, 1O7G, 1O7H, 1O7M, 1O7N, 1O7P, 1O7W, 1UUV, 1UUW, 2B1X, 2B24, 2HMJ, 2HMK, 2HML, 2HMM, 2HMN, and 2HMO.
