= Azospira =

Scientific classification
- Domain: Bacteria
- Kingdom: Pseudomonadati
- Phylum: Pseudomonadota
- Class: Betaproteobacteria
- Order: Rhodocyclales
- Family: Rhodocyclaceae
- Genus: Azospira; Reinhold-Hurek and Hurek 2000 emend. Bae et al. 2007

Type species
- Azospira oryzae

Genus of bacteria

Azospira is a genus in the phylum Pseudomonadota (Bacteria). It has two members, namely Azospira oryzae and Azospira restricta.

== See also ==
- Bacterial taxonomy
- Microbiology
