= LPXTGase =

Endopeptidase enzyme

LPXTGase refers to an endopeptidase enzyme from Streptococci and Staphylococci with the capacity to cleave the carboxy-terminal LPXTG anchor motif of surface proteins similar to Sortase. However, LPXTGase differs significantly from Sortase in several ways: a) it is glycosylated, b) it contains unconventional amino acids, and c) it contains D-amino acids. The latter two characteristics indicate that ribosomes are not involve in the synthesis of LPXTGase. Data suggest that the enzymes responsible for cell wall assembly also assemble LPXTGase.

This is the first enzyme of its kind ever reported and was discovered in streptococcal and staphylococcal lysates due to its high cleavage activity for the LPXTG sequence (200x more active than sortase). While there are only three publications describing this enzyme, all from the same source, they are in high quality peer reviewed journals. One reason for this limitation is that there is no single gene that codes for LPXTGase (it does not fit the "one gene one enzyme" theory) making its manipulation purely biochemical. Thus, reproducibility from other sources is a slow limiting process.
