= Sarkis Mazmanian =

American microbiologist (born 1972)

Sarkis K. Mazmanian
- Born: December 19, 1972 (age 53)
- Citizenship: United States
- Education: University of California at Los Angeles, B.S. (1995), Ph. D. (2002)
- Awards: Helen Hay Whitney Fellowship (2002) Searle Scholarship (2006) MacArthur Fellowship (2012)
- Scientific career
- Fields: Microbiology Immunology Neuroscience
- Workplaces: California Institute of Technology (Caltech)
- Doctoral advisor: Olaf Schneewind
- Website: sarkis.caltech.edu

Sarkis Mazmanian is an American medical microbiologist who has served as a professor at the California Institute of Technology since 2006. He is currently the Luis & Nelly Soux Professor of Microbiology in the Division of Biology and Biological Engineering, and a board member of Seed. Prior to this, Mazmanian was affiliated with Harvard Medical School and the University of Chicago. In 2012, Mazmanian was awarded a MacArthur Fellowship for his pioneering work on the human microbiome.

== Work ==
Mazmanian's research investigates the symbiotic relationship between beneficial bacteria and their hosts. In seminal work, Mazmanian discovered the first microbial molecule that has direct beneficial effects on mammals. Working in Dennis Kasper's lab, he showed in 2005 that a particular bacterial species, Bacteroides fragilis, from the human microbiome augments immune function and balances a dysregulated immune system. Mazmanian has described and defined a novel paradigm in science whereby the gut microbiome intricately controls the development and function of the mammalian immune system. These discoveries include the demonstration that B. fragilis can treat experimental inflammatory bowel disease by inducing the activity of protective, regulatory immune cells. Further, his laboratory revealed that the gut microbiome impacts autoimmune diseases such as experimental multiple sclerosis.

Mazmanian has also been involved in several ventures, having founded Axial Biotherapeutics and Symbiotix Biotherapies. Axial aimed to 'microbiota analysis to better understand the relationship between microbes and the central nervous system', and raised $102m with early investors including Longwood Fund. The New York Times noted Symbiotix as 'developing a complex sugar called PSA, which is associated with Bacteroides fragilis, into treatments for intestinal disease and multiple sclerosis'. He also serves on the scientific advisory board of over a dozen companies, academic centers and not-for-profit foundations.

== Personal life ==
Mazmanian was born in Lebanon to two Armenian refugees, moving to the US in 1973 whilst a toddler. He enrolled at UCLA in 1990, planning to major in English, before focusing on microbiology. He graduated in 1995 having majored in microbiology, before enrolling on a PHD which he concluded in 2002. He was awarded a Helen Hay Whitney Postdoctoral Fellowship at Harvard Medical School, before moving to Caltech in 2006, where he established the microbiome department.

Mazmanian's research has won him several awards including a Searle Scholar, Young Investigator of the Year at Harvard Medical School, Damon Runyon Innovation Award, the MacArthur Foundation Award, and Discover Magazine named him as one of the "Best Brains in Science under 40".
