= Thauera =

Scientific classification
- Domain: Bacteria
- Kingdom: Pseudomonadati
- Phylum: Pseudomonadota
- Class: Betaproteobacteria
- Order: Rhodocyclales
- Family: Zoogloeaceae
- Genus: Thauera; Macy et al. 1993

Type species
- Thauera selenatis

Species
- See text

Genus of bacteria

Thauera is a genus of Gram-negative bacteria in the family Zoogloeaceae of the order Rhodocyclales of the Betaproteobacteria. The genus is named for the German microbiologist Rudolf Thauer. Most species of this genus are motile by flagella and are mostly rod-shaped. The species occur in wet soil and polluted freshwater.

== Species ==
The genus includes the following species:

- T. aminoaromatica
- T. aromatica
- T. butanivorans
- T. chlorobenzoica
- T. humireducens
- T. linaloolentis
- T. mechernichensis
- T. phenylacetica
- T. propionica
- T. selenatis
- T. terpenica
