= Dechloromonas =

Scientific classification
- Domain: Bacteria
- Kingdom: Pseudomonadati
- Phylum: Pseudomonadota
- Class: Betaproteobacteria
- Order: Rhodocyclales
- Family: Azonexaceae
- Genus: Dechloromonas; Achenbach et al. 2001

Type species
- Dechloromonas agitata

Genus of bacteria

Dechloromonas is a genus in the phylum Pseudomonadota (Bacteria).

== Etymology ==
The name Dechloromonas derives from:
Latin pref. de, from; Neo-Latin noun chlorinum (from Greek adjective chlorōs, green), chlorine; Neo-Latin pref. chloro-, pertaining to chlorine; Latin feminine gender noun monas (μονάς), unit, monad; Neo-Latin feminine gender noun Dechloromonas, a dechlorinating monad.

Members of the genus Dechloromonas can be referred to as dechloromonads (viz. Trivialisation of names).

== Species ==
The genus contains 4 species, namely

- Dechloromonas agitata Achenbach et al. 2001 (type species of the genus); Latin feminine gender participle adjective agitata, excited, agitated, highly active.)
- Dechloromonas aromatica Cavalier-Smith 2002
- Dechloromonas denitrificans Horn et al. 2005; Neo-Latin participle adjective denitrificans, denitrifying.)
- Dechloromonas hortensis Wolterink et al. 2005; Latin feminine gender adjective hortensis, of or belonging to a garden.)
