= Azovibrio =

Scientific classification
- Domain: Bacteria
- Kingdom: Pseudomonadati
- Phylum: Pseudomonadota
- Class: Betaproteobacteria
- Order: Rhodocyclales
- Family: Rhodocyclaceae
- Genus: Azovibrio; Reinhold-Hurek and Hurek 2000
- Species: A. restrictus

Binomial name
- Azovibrio restrictus Reinhold-Hurek & Hurek, 2000

Genus of bacteria

Azovibrio is a genus of bacteria from the order Rhodocyclales which belongs to the class Betaproteobacteria. Up to now there is only on species known, Azovibrio restrictus.
