= Ethylcyclohexane =

Identifiers
CAS Number	1678-91-7
3D model (JSmol)	Interactive image
Abbreviations	CyEt; EtCy
ChEBI	CHEBI:137775
ChEMBL	ChEMBL1882821
ChemSpider	14751
ECHA InfoCard	100.015.305
EC Number	216-835-0
PubChem CID	15504
UNII	567IJI1215
UN number	1993
CompTox Dashboard (EPA)	DTXSID1051779
- InChI: InChI=1S/C8H16/c1-2-8-6-4-3-5-7-8/h8H,2-7H2,1H3 Key: IIEWJVIFRVWJOD-UHFFFAOYSA-N
- SMILES: CCC1CCCCC1

Properties
Chemical formula	C_{8}H_{16}
Molar mass	112.216 g·mol^{−1}
Appearance	colorless liquid
Density	0.788 g/cm^{3}
Melting point	−111.3 °C (−168.3 °F; 161.8 K)
Boiling point	130–132 °C (266–270 °F; 403–405 K)

Hazards
- GHS labelling
Pictograms	(GHS05: Corrosive) (GHS07: Exclamation mark) (GHS08: Health hazard)
Signal word	Danger
Hazard statements	H225, H304, H336
Precautionary statements	P210, P233, P240, P241, P242, P243, P261, P271, P280, P301+P316, P303+P361+P353, P304+P340, P319, P331, P370+P378, P403+P233, P403+P235, P405, P501
Flash point	35 °C; 95 °F; 308 K
Autoignition temperature	238 °C; 460 °F; 511 K
- Except where otherwise noted, data are given for materials in their standard state (at 25 °C [77 °F], 100 kPa). Infobox references

Ethylcyclohexane is an organic compound with the formula C_{6}H_{11}C_{2}H_{5}. The molecule consists of an ethyl group attached to a cyclohexane ring. It is a typical naphthene in petroleum. It can be produced by hydrogenation of ethylbenzene and by hydrodeoxygenation of lignin.
