= Azonexus fungiphilus =

Scientific classification
- Domain: Bacteria
- Kingdom: Pseudomonadati
- Phylum: Pseudomonadota
- Class: Betaproteobacteria
- Order: Rhodocyclales
- Family: Azonexaceae
- Genus: Azonexus
- Species: A. fungiphilus

Binomial name
- Azonexus fungiphilus Reinhold-Hurek & Hurek, 2000

Species of bacterium

Azonexus fungiphilus is a species of bacteria. It is a root bacteria.
