= Azonexus hydrophilus =

Scientific classification
- Domain: Bacteria
- Kingdom: Pseudomonadati
- Phylum: Pseudomonadota
- Class: Betaproteobacteria
- Order: Rhodocyclales
- Family: Azonexaceae
- Genus: Azonexus
- Species: A. hydrophiluss

Binomial name
- Azonexus hydrophiluss Chou et al. 2008

Type strain
- BCRC 17657, CCRC 17657, Chen d8-1, d8-1, LMG 24005

Species of bacterium

Azonexus hydrophilus is a gram negative, facultatively aerobic, rod-shaped bacterium from the genus Azonexus which was isolated from freshwater. Azonexus fungiphilus possesses the nitrogenase-gene nifH.
