= Protein-sorting transpeptidase =

Enzyme

A protein-sorting transpeptidase is an enzyme, such as the sortase SrtA of Staphylococcus aureus, that cleaves one or more target proteins produced by the same cell, as part of a specialized pathway of protein targeting. The typical prokaryotic protein-sorting transpeptidase is characterized as a protease, but does not simply hydrolyze a peptide bond. Instead, the larger, N-terminal portion of the cleaved polypeptide is transferred onto another molecule, such as a precursor of the peptidoglycan cell wall in Gram-positive bacteria.

The term sortase is properly reserved for the set of cysteine protease enzymes sortase A, sortase B, and members of additional classes, all of which share homology. However, a growing number of additional protein sorting systems has been described in prokaryotes, involving sorting enzymes that lack any homology to sortase and that appear to have arisen separately by convergent evolution. Although the sortases are the best described members of the protein-sorting transpeptidases, work on the analogous enzymes archaeosortase, rhombosortase, and the PorU enzyme of type IX secretion systems (T9SS) has been accumulating.

sorting enzyme	mechanism	cognate sorting signal
sortase A	cysteine protease	LPXTG
sortase B	cysteine protease	NPQTN
archaeosortase A	cysteine protease	PGF-CTERM
exosortase A	cysteine protease	PEP-CTERM
rhombosortase	serine protease	GlyGly-CTERM
PorU as in Porphyromonas gingivalis	serine protease	T9SS C-terminal beta-sandwich domain

Myxosortases, homologs of the type 2 CAAX prenyl protease Rce1, are analogous protein-sorting enzymes, but they are unlikely to function as transpeptidases. It is likely, instead, that the cysteine residue in the target sequence is modified by a separate enzyme, and that modification is followed by cleavage by the myxosortase, as happens with Rce1. The exact biochemistry of the overall modification is not yet known.
