= Aromatoleum =

Scientific classification
- Domain: Bacteria
- Kingdom: Pseudomonadati
- Phylum: Pseudomonadota
- Class: Betaproteobacteria
- Order: Rhodocyclales
- Family: Zoogloeaceae
- Genus: Aromatoleum; Rabus et al. 2019

Type species
- Aromatoleum aromaticum Rabus et al. 2019

Genus of bacteria

Aromatoleum is a genus of bacteria capable of microbial biodegradation of organic pollutants.

The discovery of the strain EbN1 was published in 1995, and it was initially included in the Azoarcus/Thauera cluster.

Aromatoleum aromaticum strain EbN1 has been fully sequenced by the same researchers who discovered it and coworkers. It has one chromosome and two plasmids, encoding for 10 anaerobic and 4 aerobic aromatic degradation pathways. The genome is rich in paralogous gene clusters, mobile gene elements, and genes similar to that from other bacteria, suggesting a history full of horizontal gene transfer events. The bacterium has a well-regulated metabolic network. Unlike many species in Azoarcus proper, it is incapable of fixing nitrogen.
