= Propionivibrio =

Scientific classification
- Domain: Bacteria
- Kingdom: Pseudomonadati
- Phylum: Pseudomonadota
- Class: Betaproteobacteria
- Order: Rhodocyclales
- Family: Rhodocyclaceae
- Genus: Propionivibrio; Tanaka et al. 1991

Type species
- Propionivibrio dicarboxylicus

Species
- Propionivibrio dicarboxylicus Propionivibrio limicola Propionivibrio pelophilus

Synonyms
- Propionibacter Meijer et al. 1999

Genus of bacteria

Propionivibrio is a genus of gram-negative, chemoorganotrophic, non-spore-forming bacteria from the family of Rhodocyclaceae which belongs to the class of Betaproteobacteria.
