= Rhodocyclus =

Scientific classification
- Domain: Bacteria
- Kingdom: Pseudomonadati
- Phylum: Pseudomonadota
- Class: Betaproteobacteria
- Order: Rhodocyclales
- Family: Rhodocyclaceae
- Genus: Rhodocyclus; Pfennig 1978

Type species
- Rhodocyclus purpureus

Species
- Rhodocyclus gelatinosus Rhodocyclus purpureus Rhodocyclus tenuis

Genus of bacteria

Rhodocyclus is a genus of gram-negative bacteria from the family of Rhodocyclaceae which belongs to the class of Betaproteobacteria.
