= Azoarcus =

Scientific classification
- Domain: Bacteria
- Kingdom: Pseudomonadati
- Phylum: Pseudomonadota
- Class: Betaproteobacteria
- Order: Rhodocyclales
- Family: Zoogloeaceae
- Genus: Azoarcus; Reinhold-Hurek et al. 1993

Type species
- Azoarcus indigens

Species
- Azoarcus anaerobius Azoarcus buckelii Azoarcus communis Azoarcus evansii Azoarcus indigens Azoarcus olearius Azoarcus toluclasticus Azoarcus tolulyticus Azoarcus toluvorans

Genus of bacteria

Azoarcus is a genus of nitrogen-fixing bacteria. Species in this genus are usually found in contaminated water, as they are involved in the degradation of some contaminants, commonly inhabiting soil. These bacteria have also been found growing in the endophytic compartment (inside the plant between the living cells) of some rice species and other grasses. The genus is within the family Zoogloeaceae in the Rhodocyclales of the Betaproteobacteria.

Many studies reported this genus about its potential extracellular electron uptake metabolism and has been found in the cathodic part of many microbial fuel cells, notably in nitrate and oxygen reducing bio-cathodes biofilms.
