= Olaf Schneewind =

German-born American microbiologist (1961–2019)

- Born: June 23, 1961; Germany
- Died: May 26, 2019 (aged 57)
- Education: University of Cologne
- Known for: S. aureus pathogenesis
- Scientific career
- Fields: Microbiology
- Workplaces: University of California, Los Angeles; University of Chicago
- Doctoral students: Luciano Marraffini; Sarkis Mazmanian

Olaf Schneewind (June 23, 1961 – May 26, 2019) was a German-born American microbiologist who made important contributions to the study of bacterial cell wall composition and assembly as well as the pathogenesis of the microbial species Staphylococcus aureus. He was elected to the National Academy of Sciences in 2018.

== Career ==
Schneewind was born in Germany and attended the University of Cologne. He completed postdoctoral training with Vincent Fischetti at Rockefeller University. Schneewind subsequently joined the faculty of the University of California, Los Angeles in 1992. His first major discovery as an independent investigator was the finding that the surface proteins of gram-positive bacteria are cleaved between the T and G residue in the LPXTG sortase signal by the enzyme sortase (the enzyme was not discovered yet, but was later shown by him to be responsible for the cleavage) in order to be anchored to the cell wall.

In 2001, Schneewind began teaching at the University of Chicago within the Department of Molecular Genetics and Cell Biology. In 2004, he was named the founding chair of the Department of Microbiology. He assumed the Louis Block Professorship and remained at UChicago until his death from cancer on May 26, 2019.
