= Ferribacterium =

Scientific classification
- Domain: Bacteria
- Kingdom: Pseudomonadati
- Phylum: Pseudomonadota
- Class: Betaproteobacteria
- Order: Rhodocyclales
- Family: Azonexaceae
- Genus: Ferribacterium; Cummings et al. 2000

Type species
- Ferribacterium limneticum Cummings et al. 2000

Species
- Ferribacterium limneticum

Genus of bacteria

Ferribacterium is a genus of bacteria from the family Azonexaceae which belongs to the class Betaproteobacteria. Up to now there is only one species of this genus known (Ferribacterium limneticum).
