= Azonexus =

Scientific classification
- Domain: Bacteria
- Kingdom: Pseudomonadati
- Phylum: Pseudomonadota
- Class: Betaproteobacteria
- Order: Rhodocyclales
- Family: Azonexaceae
- Genus: Azonexus; Reinhold-Hurek and Hurek 2000

Type species
- Azonexus fungiphilus

Species
- Azonexus caeni Azonexus fungiphilus Azonexus hydrophilus

Genus of bacteria

Azonexus is a genus of gram-negative, non-spore-forming, highly motile bacteria that is the type genus of the family Azonexaceae which is in the order Rhodocyclales of the class Betaproteobacteria.
