= Sortase B =

Identifiers
- EC no.: 3.4.22.71

Databases
- IntEnz: IntEnz view
- BRENDA: BRENDA entry
- ExPASy: NiceZyme view
- KEGG: KEGG entry
- MetaCyc: metabolic pathway
- PRIAM: profile
- PDB structures: RCSB PDB PDBe PDBsum
Search
- PMC: articles
- PubMed: articles
- NCBI: proteins

Sortases are membrane anchored enzyme that sort these surface proteins onto the bacterial cell surface and anchor them to the peptidoglycan. There are different types of sortases and each catalyse the anchoring of different proteins to cell walls.

It is very important for bacteria to acquire iron during infection, Iron is perhaps the most important micronutrient required for bacteria to proliferate and cause disease. Sortase B, is a 246 amino acids polypeptide with putative N-terminal membrane anchor and an active site cysteine located within the TLXTC signature motif of sortases.

It appears these enzymes are dedicated to helping the bacteria acquire iron by anchoring iron acquisition proteins to the cell membrane Sortase B recognises and cleaves the NPQTN motif. It links IsDC to mature assemble peptidoglycan, The enzyme catalyses a cell wall sorting reaction in which a surface protein with a sorting signal containing a NXTN motif is cleaved.

This enzyme belongs to the peptidase family C60.

== Structure ==
SrtB overall structure is conserved in different gram-positive bacteria. The overall structure of SrtB in S. aureus as shown in the figure, consists of a unique eight-stranded β-barrel core structure and a two-helix subdomain at the N-terminal end.

SrtB is similar in structure to SrtA with rmsd of 1.25Å but SrtB has more peripheral helices It has an N-terminal helical bundle and an α-helix between β6 and β7. The N-terminal extension present in SrtB relative to SrtA is very significant. It is known to place the two termini on the same side of the protein. This is believed to result in a different orientation of the protein on the surface of the cell, potentially affecting substrate access.

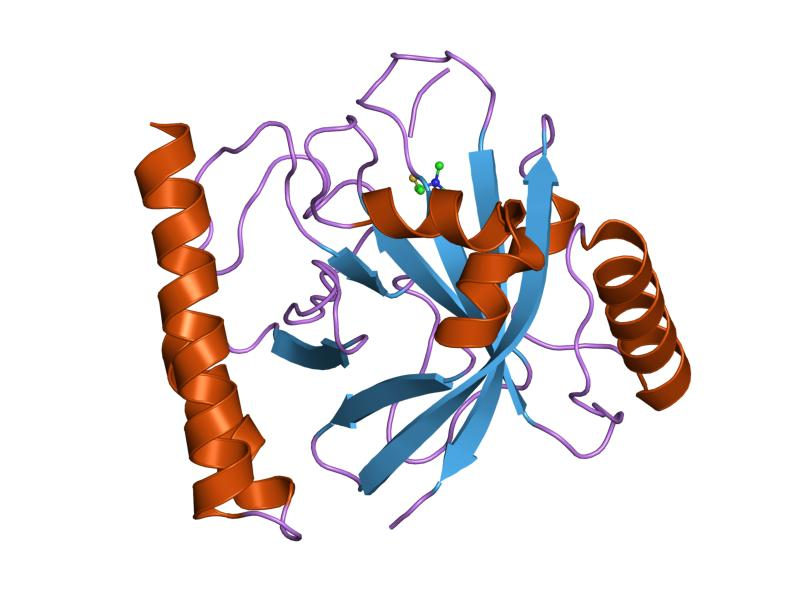
Crystal Structure Of Sortase B complexed with Gly3

== Catalysis ==
The sortase B enzyme catalyzes a cell wall sorting reaction with a surface protein where a signal NXTN motif is cleaved. In the result, the C-end of the protein is covalently attached to a pentaglycine cross-bridge through an amide linkage, thus tethering the C-terminus of protein A to the cell wall.

It cleaves the protein precursor molecule at the NPQTN motif. The peptide bond between T and N of the NPQTN sorting motif is cleaved to form a tetrahedral acyl intermediate. The amino groups of the pentaglycine cross-bridges linked to the lipid II peptidoglycan precursor molecules are thought to function as nucleophile resolving acyl intermediates and creating an amide bond between the surface protein and lipid II with subsequent incorporation of this intermediate into the cell wall envelope.

IsdC remains buried within the cell wall, not surface located like IsdA and IsdB anchored by Sortase A. This whole system work together to scavenge iron from haemoglobin.

== Biological role ==
Surface proteins of Gram-positive bacteria play an important role in the pathogenesis of human infections such as Clostridioides difficile infection. These surface/adhesion proteins mediate the initial attachment of bacteria to host tissues. These proteins are covalently linked to the peptidoglycan of the bacterial cell wall. As more and more pathogens become resistant to antibiotics, inhibition of sortases may offer a novel strategy against gram-positive bacterial infections.

SrtB, in particular, has gained much attention and is recognized as a promising target and deletion of its gene in gram-positive bacteria will lead to serious virulence defects. Crystal structures of these SrtB enzymes from different species have been solved with ligands/inhibitors bound to their active site. With knowledge of the active site, the development of better therapeutics against these bacteria species can be done.
