= Selenate reductase =

Identifiers
- EC no.: 1.97.1.9

Databases
- IntEnz: IntEnz view
- BRENDA: BRENDA entry
- ExPASy: NiceZyme view
- KEGG: KEGG entry
- MetaCyc: metabolic pathway
- PRIAM: profile
- PDB structures: RCSB PDB PDBe PDBsum
Search
- PMC: articles
- PubMed: articles
- NCBI: proteins

In enzymology, a selenate reductase (EC 1.97.1.9) is an enzyme that catalyzes the chemical reaction

selenite + H_{2}O + acceptor $\rightleftharpoons$ selenate + reduced acceptor

The 3 substrates of this enzyme are selenite, H_{2}O, and acceptor, whereas its two products are selenate and reduced acceptor.

This enzyme belongs to the family of oxidoreductases. The systematic name of this enzyme class is selenite:reduced acceptor oxidoreductase.
