= Quatrionicoccus =

Scientific classification
- Domain: Bacteria
- Kingdom: Pseudomonadati
- Phylum: Pseudomonadota
- Class: Betaproteobacteria
- Order: Rhodocyclales
- Family: Azonexaceae
- Genus: Quatrionicoccus; Tindall and Euzéby 2006
- Species: Q. australiensis

Binomial name
- Quatrionicoccus australiensis (Maszenan et al. 2002) Tindall and Euzéby 2006

Type strain
- Ben 117, CIP 107055, KCTC 12953, NCIMB 13738

Synonyms
- Genus: Quadricoccus Maszenan et al. 2002; Species: Quadricoccus australiensis Maszenan et al. 2002

Genus of bacteria

Quatrionicoccus (also known as its synonym Quadricoccus) is a genus of gram-negative, oxidase-negative, catalase-positive, aerobic, non-spore-forming, non-motile bacteria from the family Azonexaceae which belongs to the class Betaproteobacteria. So far there is only one species of this genus known, Quatrionicoccus australiensis.

Quatrionicoccus australiensis was isolated from activated sludge biomass sample in Australia.
