= Archaeosortase =

Protein family

An archaeosortase is a protein that occurs in the cell membranes of some archaea. Archaeosortases recognize and remove carboxyl-terminal protein sorting signals – which are about 25 amino acids long – from secreted proteins. A genome that encodes one archaeosortase may encode over fifty target proteins. The best characterized archaeosortase target is the Haloferax volcanii S-layer glycoprotein, an extensively modified protein with O-linked glycosylations, N-linked glycosylations, and a large prenyl-derived lipid modification toward the C-terminus. Knockout of the archaeosortase A (artA) gene, or permutation of the motif Pro-Gly-Phe (PGF) to Pro-Phe-Gly in the S-layer glycoprotein, blocks attachment of the lipid moiety as well as blocking removal of the PGF-CTERM protein-sorting domain. Thus, archaeosortase appears to be a transpeptidase, like sortase, rather than a simple protease.

Archaeosortases are related to exosortases, their uncharacterized counterparts in Gram-negative bacteria. The names of both families of proteins reflect roles analogous to sortases in Gram-positive bacteria, with which they share no sequence homology. The sequences of archaeosortases and exosortases consists mostly of hydrophobic transmembrane helices, which sortases lack. Archaeosortases fall into a number of distinct subtypes, each responsible for recognizing sorting signals with a different signature motif. Archaeosortase A (ArtA) recognizes the PGF-CTERM signal, ArtB recognizes VPXXXP-CTERM, AtrC recognizes PEF-CTERM, and so on; one archaeal genome may encode two different archaeosortase systems.

Invariant residues shared by all archaeosortases and exosortases include a Cys and an Arg. Replacement of either destroys catalytic activity, suggesting convergent evolution of the active site with the sortases.

In the archaeal model species Haloferax volcanii, archaeosortase A belongs to a fairly large collection of identified membrane-associated proteases, but apparently also to the smaller set of intramembrane cleaving proteases, along with the rhomboid protease RhoII, and in contrast to bacterial sortases.
