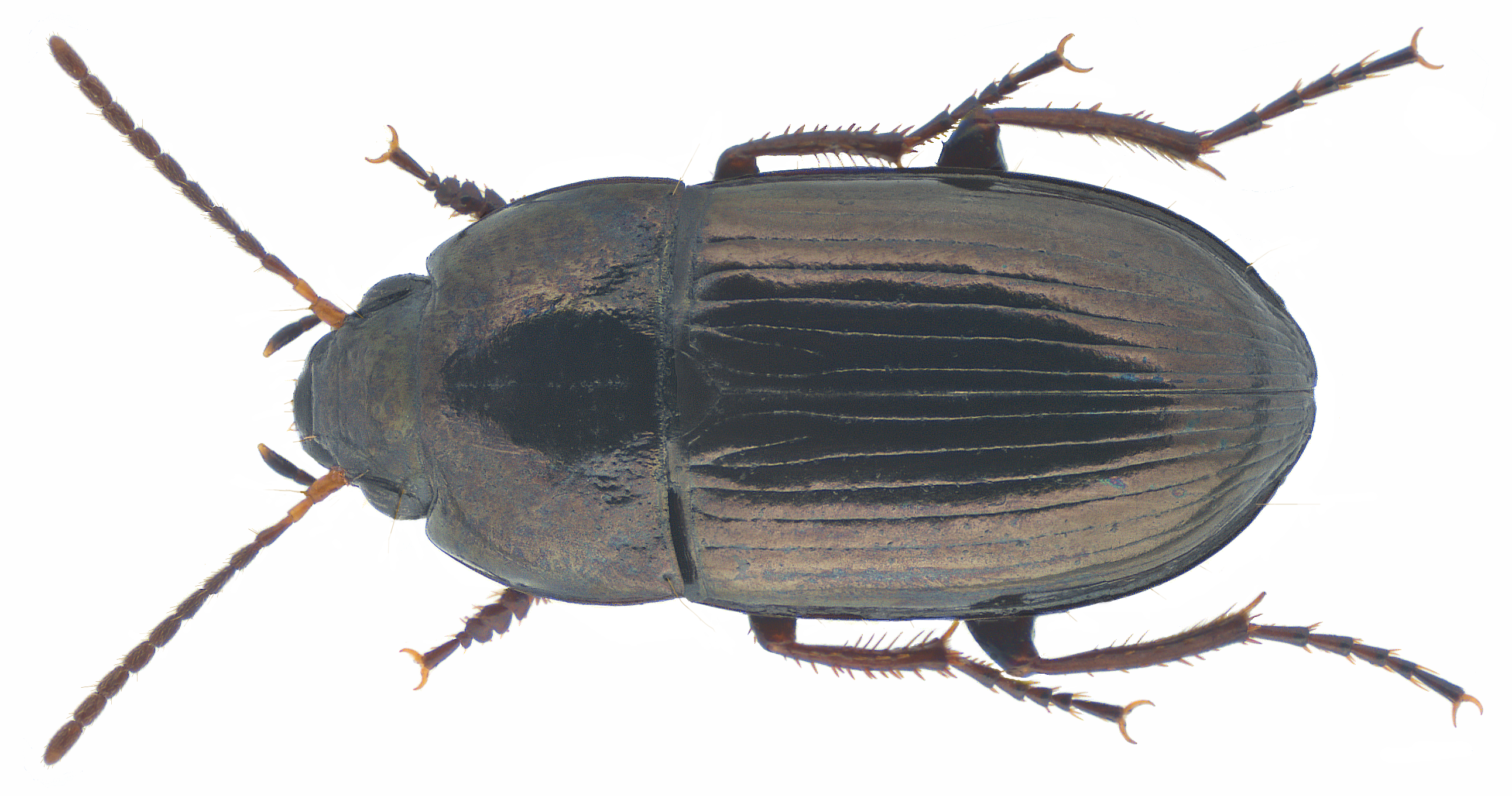

Scientific classification
- Kingdom: Animalia
- Phylum: Arthropoda
- Class: Insecta
- Order: Coleoptera
- Suborder: Adephaga
- Family: Carabidae
- Genus: Amara
- Species: A. communis

Binomial name
- Amara communis (Panzer, 1797)

Synonyms
- Carabus communis Panzer, 1797

= Amara communis =

Species of beetle

Amara communis is a species of beetle in the family Carabidae found in Ireland, from Siberia to Kamchatka, and Caucasus. The species are 6–8mm in length, and live in moss.
