= Ethylbenzene =

Hydrocarbon compound; precursor to styrene and polystyrene

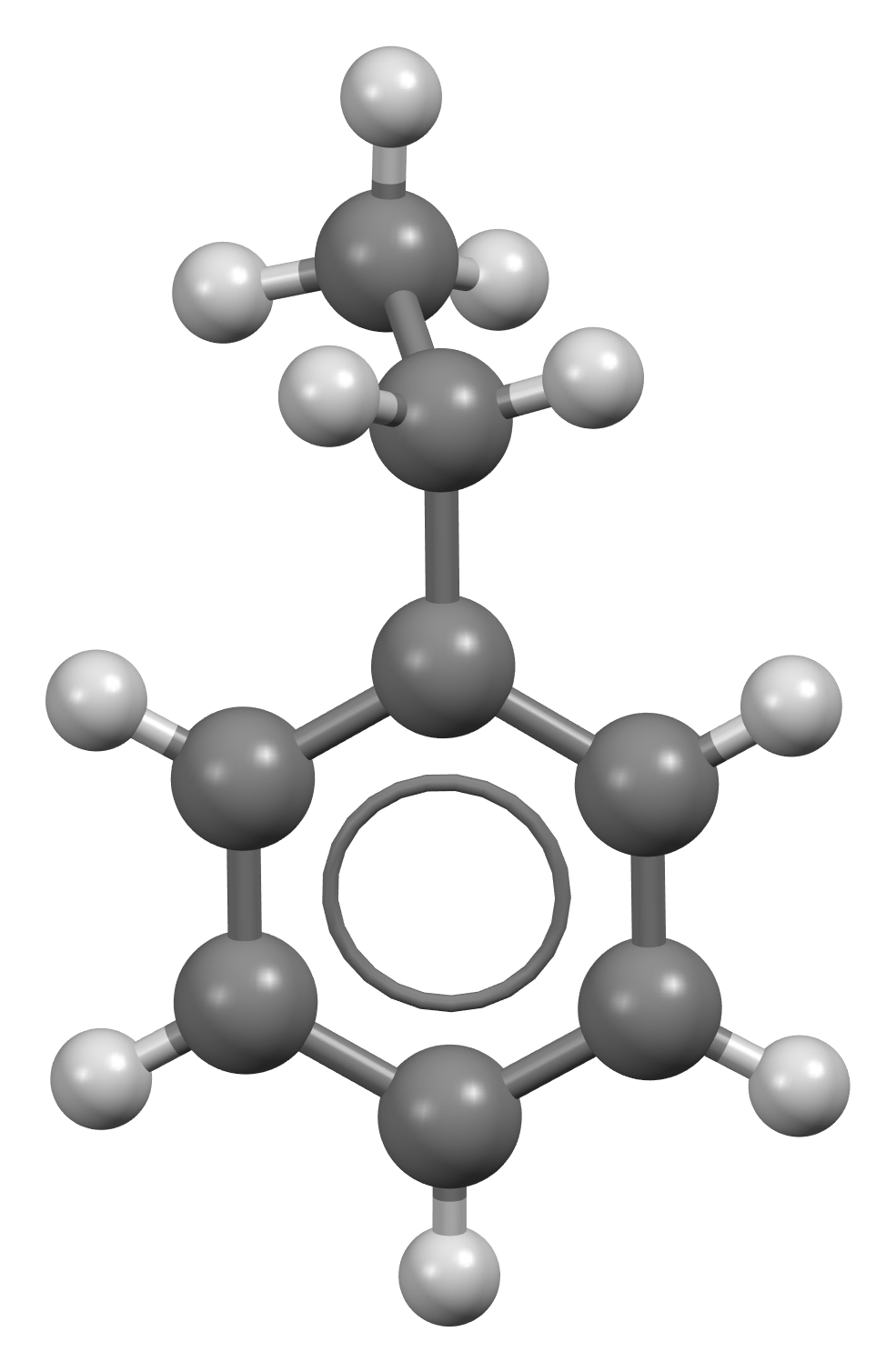

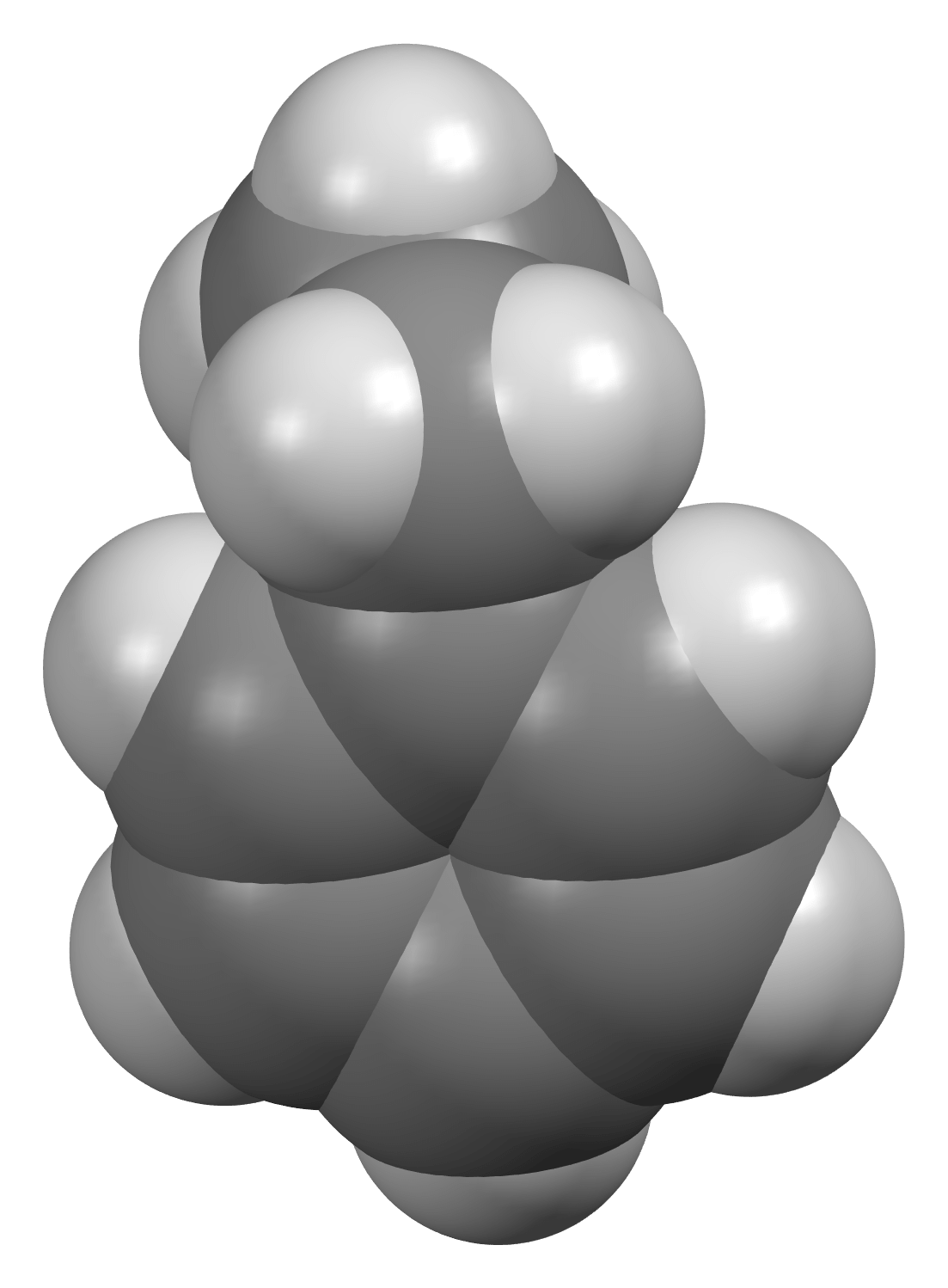

Names
- Preferred IUPAC name Ethylbenzene
- Other names Ethylbenzol; Phenylethane; alpha-Methyltoluene; EB

Identifiers
CAS Number	100-41-4
3D model (JSmol)	Interactive image
Abbreviations	EB; PhEt
Beilstein Reference	1901871
ChEBI	CHEBI:16101
ChEMBL	ChEMBL371561
ChemSpider	7219
DrugBank	DB01722
ECHA InfoCard	100.002.591
KEGG	C07111
PubChem CID	7500
RTECS number	DA0700000
UNII	L5I45M5G0O
CompTox Dashboard (EPA)	DTXSID3020596
- InChI: InChI=1S/C8H10/c1-2-8-6-4-3-5-7-8/h3-7H,2H2,1H3 Key: YNQLUTRBYVCPMQ-UHFFFAOYSA-N; InChI=1/C8H10/c1-2-8-6-4-3-5-7-8/h3-7H,2H2,1H3 Key: YNQLUTRBYVCPMQ-UHFFFAOYAM
- SMILES: CCc1ccccc1

Properties
Chemical formula	C_{8}H_{10}
Molar mass	106.168 g·mol^{−1}
Appearance	colorless liquid
Odor	aromatic
Density	0.8665 g/mL
Melting point	−95 °C (−139 °F; 178 K)
Boiling point	136 °C (277 °F; 409 K)
Solubility in water	0.015 g/100 mL (20 °C)
log P	3.27
Vapor pressure	9.998 mmHg
Magnetic susceptibility (χ)	−77.20·10^{−6} cm^{3}/mol
Refractive index (n_{D})	1.495
Viscosity	0.669 cP at 20 °C
Dipole moment	0.58 D

Thermochemistry
Heat capacity (C)	1.726 J/(gK)

Hazards
- Occupational safety and health (OHS/OSH)
Main hazards	Flammable
- GHS labelling
Pictograms	(GHS02: Flammable) (GHS07: Exclamation mark) (GHS08: Health hazard) (GHS09: Environmental hazard)
Signal word	Danger
Hazard statements	H225, H304, H320, H332, H335, H336, H351, H360, H373, H400, H411
Precautionary statements	P201, P202, P210, P233, P240, P241, P242, P243, P260, P264, P271, P273, P280, P281, P301+P310, P303+P361+P353, P304+P312, P304+P340, P305+P351+P338, P308+P313, P312, P314, P331, P337+P313, P370+P378, P391, P403+P233, P403+P235, P405, P501
NFPA 704 (fire diamond)	2 3 0
Flash point	22.22 °C (72.00 °F; 295.37 K)
Autoignition temperature	430 °C (806 °F; 703 K)
Explosive limits	1–7.8%
- Lethal dose or concentration (LD, LC)
LD_{50} (median dose)	5460 mg/kg
LC_{Lo} (lowest published)	4000 ppm (rat, 4 hr)
- NIOSH (US health exposure limits)
PEL (Permissible)	TWA 100 ppm (435 mg/m^{3})
REL (Recommended)	TWA 100 ppm (435 mg/m^{3}) ST 125 ppm (545 mg/m^{3})
IDLH (Immediate danger)	800 ppm

Related compounds
Related aromatic hydrocarbons	styrene, toluene
Related compounds	benzene ethylcyclohexane
- Except where otherwise noted, data are given for materials in their standard state (at 25 °C [77 °F], 100 kPa). verify (what is ?) Infobox references

Ethylbenzene is an organic compound with the formula C_{8}H_{10} or C_{6}H_{5}CH_{2}CH_{3}. It is a highly flammable, colorless liquid with an odor similar to that of gasoline. This monocyclic aromatic hydrocarbon is important in the petrochemical industry as a reaction intermediate in the production of styrene, the precursor to polystyrene, a common plastic material. In 2012, more than 99% of ethylbenzene produced was consumed in the production of styrene.

== Occurrence and applications ==
Ethylbenzene occurs naturally in coal tar and petroleum.

The dominant application of ethylbenzene is its role as an intermediate in the production of polystyrene. Catalytic dehydrogenation of ethylbenzene gives hydrogen and styrene:

C_{6}H_{5}CH_{2}CH_{3} → C_{6}H_{5}CH=CH_{2} + H_{2}

As of May 2012, more than 99% of all the ethylbenzene produced is used for this purpose.

Ethylbenzene hydroperoxide, a reagent and radical initiator, is produced by autoxidation of ethylbenzene:

C_{6}H_{5}CH_{2}CH_{3} + O_{2} → C_{6}H_{5}CH(O_{2}H)CH_{3}

=== Niche uses ===
Ethylbenzene is added to gasoline as an anti-knock agent to reduce engine knocking and increase the octane rating. Ethylbenzene is often found in other products, including pesticides, cellulose acetate, synthetic rubber, paints, and inks. Used in the recovery of natural gas, ethylbenzene may be injected into the ground.

== Production ==
Ethylbenzene is produced on a large scale by combining benzene and ethene in an acid-catalyzed chemical reaction:

C_{6}H_{6} + C_{2}H_{4} → C_{6}H_{5}CH_{2}CH_{3}

In 2012, more than 99% of ethylbenzene was produced in this way.

Small amounts of ethylbenzene are recovered from the mix of xylenes by superfractioning, an extension of the distillation process.

In the 1980s a zeolite-based process using vapor phase alkylation offered a higher purity and yield. Then a liquid phase process was introduced using zeolite catalysts. This offers low benzene-to-ethylene ratios, reducing the size of the required equipment and lowering byproduct production.

=== Industrial accidents ===
On June 3, 2014, an explosion occurred in the Dutch Moerdijk industrial area. This happened in a chemical reactor operated by Shell which overheated due to an exothermal runaway reaction between the metal oxide catalyst and ethylbenzene.

== Health effects ==
The acute toxicity of ethylbenzene is low, with an LD_{50} of about 4 grams per kilogram of body weight. The longer term toxicity and carcinogenicity is ambiguous. Eye and throat sensitivity can occur when high level exposure to ethylbenzene in the air occurs. At higher level exposure, ethylbenzene can cause dizziness. Once inside the body, ethylbenzene biodegrades to 1-phenylethanol, acetophenone, phenylglyoxylic acid, mandelic acid, benzoic acid and hippuric acid. Ethylbenzene exposure can be determined by testing for the breakdown products in urine.

As of September 2007, the United States Environmental Protection Agency (EPA) determined that drinking water with a concentration of 30 parts per million (ppm) for one day or 3 ppm for ten days is not expected to have any adverse effect in children. Lifetime exposure of 0.7 ppm ethylbenzene is not expected to have any adverse effect either. The U.S. Occupational Safety and Health Administration (OSHA) limits exposure to workers to an average 100 ppm for an 8-hour workday, a 40-hour workweek.

Ethylbenzene is classified as a possible carcinogen by the International Agency for Research on Cancer (IARC) however, the EPA has not determined ethylbenzene to be a carcinogen. The National Toxicology Program conducted an inhalation study in rats and mice. Exposure to ethylbenzene resulted in an increased incidence of kidney and testicular tumors in male rats, and trends of increased kidney tumors in female rats, lung tumors in male mice, and liver tumors in female mice.

As with all organic compounds, ethylbenzene vapors form an explosive mixture with air. When transporting ethylbenzene, it is classified as a flammable liquid in class 3, Packing Group II.

=== Environmental effects ===
Ethylbenzene is found mostly as a vapor in the air since it can easily move from water and soil. A median concentration of 0.62 parts per billion (ppb) was found in urban air in 1999. A study conducted in 2012 found that in country air the median concentration was found to be 0.01 ppb and indoors the median concentration was 1.0 ppb. It can also be released into the air through the burning of coal, gas, and oil. The use of ethylbenzene in the industry contributes to ethylbenzene vapor in the air. After about three days in the air with the help of sunlight, other chemicals break down ethylbenzene into chemicals that can be found in smog. Since it does not readily bind to soil it can also easily move into groundwater. In surface water, it breaks down when it reacts with chemicals naturally found in water. Generally, ethylbenzene is not found in drinking water, however it can be found in residential drinking water wells if the wells are near waste sites, underground fuel storage tanks that are leaking, or landfills.

As of 2012, according to the EU Dangerous Substances Directive, ethylbenzene is not classified as hazardous to the environment.

Ethylbenzene is a constituent of tobacco smoke.

=== Biodegradation ===
Certain strains of the fungus Cladophialophora can grow on ethylbenzene. The bacterium Aromatoleum aromaticum EbN1 was discovered due to its ability to grow on ethylbenzene.
