= Emil C. Gotschlich =

American chemist (1935–2023)

- Born: January 17, 1935; Bangkok, Siam
- Died: February 14, 2023 (aged 88)
- Citizenship: American
- Education: New York University
- Known for: first meningitis vaccine
- Awards: Squibb Award; Albert Lasker Clinical Medical Research Award
- Scientific career
- Workplaces: Rockefeller University

Emil Claus Gotschlich (January 17, 1935 – February 14, 2023) was an American physician-scientist, who was professor emeritus at the Rockefeller University. He was best known for his development of the first meningitis vaccine in 1970.

== Early life and education ==
Emil Gotschlich was born in Bangkok, Thailand, on January 17, 1935, to German parents, Emil Clemens Gotschlich, a physician in private practice in Thailand and his wife Magdalene, née Holst, who were both physicians. His grandfather, Emil Carl Anton Constantin Gotschlich was a prominent German academic physician, who specialized in cholera and tropical diseases and had been a student of Carl Flügge and a colleague of Max Joseph von Pettenkofer and Robert Koch. His great uncle, Felix Gotschlich had isolated Vibrio cholerae in 1906.

Emil Gotschlich was mainly brought up in Switzerland; his mother worked at a home for children rescued from the Nazi death camps. In 1950, when Gotschlich was 15, his family moved to the USA.

In 1959, Gotschlich graduated from the New York University School of Medicine. He interned at Bellevue Hospital in New York and in 1960 joined The Rockefeller University's Laboratory of Bacteriology and Immunology under Rebecca Lancefield and Maclyn McCarty.

== Career ==
From 1966 until 1968, Gotschlich worked at the Walter Reed Army Institute of Research in Silver Spring, MD. He and his coworkers developed a purified polysaccharide vaccine for Meningococcus group C meningitis. He first tested it on himself after it had failed in laboratory animals. In 1970, the vaccine was approved for use in military recruits. Returning to Rockefeller he developed a vaccine against Meningococcus group A. He was also involved in research on Neisseria gonorrhoeae and streptococcal infection.

In 1978, he was promoted to professor and senior physician at The Rockefeller University Hospital. From 1996 to 2005 he served as the hospital's vice president for medical sciences. In 2001, he was involved in a committee that evaluated the plan of the US Centers for Disease Control and Prevention of the US Army's anthrax vaccine.

== Personal life and death ==
Gotschlich was married and had 4 children. He died on February 14, 2023, at the age of 88, survived by his second wife, immunologist Kathleen Haines and his children: Emil Christofer Gotschlich, Emil Chandler Gotschlich, Hilda Christina Gartley, and Emily Claire Gotschlich.

== Awards and honors ==
In 1974, he received the Squibb Award by the Infectious Diseases Society of America. In 1978 he received the Albert Lasker Clinical Medical Research Award and in 2008 the Dart/NYU Biotechnology Achievement Award. He was a member of the National Academy of Sciences and its Institute of Medicine.
