= Dissimilation =

Dissimilation or Dissimilate may refer to:

== Culture ==
- Cultural dissimilation, the process whereby a minority group deconverts from the attitudes and customs of the prevailing culture and customs, returning to their previous ones

== Science ==
- Catabolism, the set of metabolic pathways that breaks down molecules into smaller units
- Dissimilation (phonology), a linguistic process by which a sound becomes less similar to an adjacent sound
