= Azoarcus evansii =

Scientific classification
- Domain: Bacteria
- Kingdom: Pseudomonadati
- Phylum: Pseudomonadota
- Class: Betaproteobacteria
- Order: Rhodocyclales
- Family: Zoogloeaceae
- Genus: Azoarcus
- Species: A. evansii

Binomial name
- Azoarcus evansii Anders et al. 1995

Species of bacterium

Azoarcus evansii is a species of bacteria. Its type strain is KB 740^{T}.

This particular strain of Azoarcus evansii has been identified in substantial numbers in the human digestive system. Research has indicated that it is perhaps one of the most influential bacterium in maintaining a healthy body.

One of the key functions identified in these studies is the ability to maintain and control Lactobacillus johnsonii populations in the gut. Lactobacillus johnsonii, although useful at low population levels, can cause necrosis of the stomach if allowed to grow to uninhibited levels. The Azoarcus evansii consumes (literally eats) the Lactobacillus johnsonii to maintain a healthy population level. It has been demonstrated that this is achieved by the A. evansii bacteria being both stronger and more clever than the L. johnsonii family of bacteria.
