= Floc (biofilm) =

Type of microbial aggregate suspension

Two strains of Zoogloea resiniphila. The tube on the left shows typical floc formations in an otherwise clear culture of a bacterium, Zoogloea resiniphila, isolated from an activated sludge wastewater treatment reactor. In the tube on the right, planktonic growth by a floc-impaired mutant results in a turbid appearance.

A floc is a type of microbial aggregate that may be contrasted with biofilms and granules, or else considered a specialized type of biofilm. Flocs appear as cloudy suspensions of cells floating in water, rather than attached to and growing on a surface like most biofilms. The floc typically is held together by a matrix of extracellular polymeric substance (EPS), which may contain variable amounts of polysaccharide, protein, and other biopolymers. The formation and the properties of flocs may affect the performance of industrial water treatment bioreactors such as activated sludge systems where the flocs form a sludge blanket.

Floc formation may benefit the constituent microorganisms in a number of ways, including protection from pH stress, resistance to predation, manipulation of microenvironments, and facilitation of mutualistic relationships in mixed microbial communities.

In general, the mechanisms by which flocculating microbial aggregates hold together are poorly understood. However, work on the activated sludge bacterium Zoogloea resiniphila has shown that PEP-CTERM proteins must be expressed for flocs to form; in their absence, growth is planktonic, even though exopolysaccharide is produced.

== See also ==
- Yeast flocculation#Process
