= Sortase =

Group of prokaryotic enzymes

Sortase family
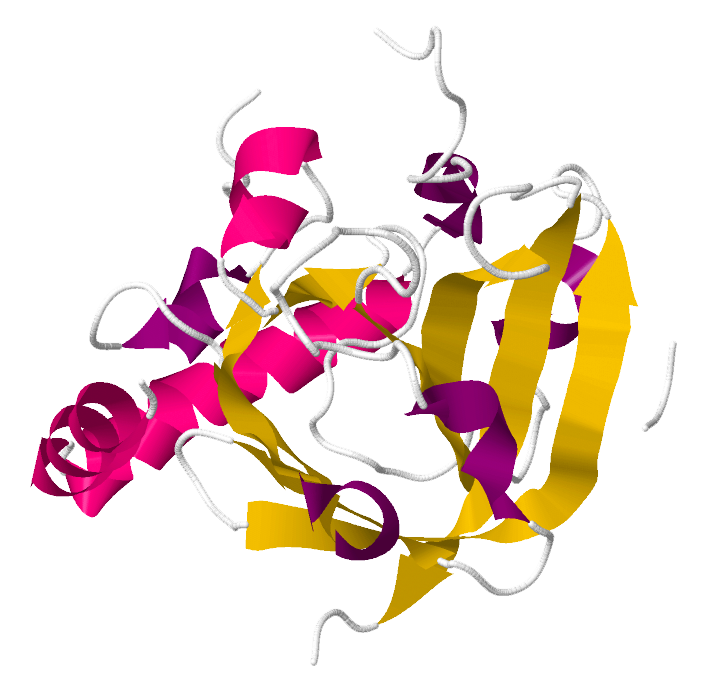
- Pilus-related Sortase C of Group B Streptococcus. PDB entry 3O0P

Identifiers
- Symbol: Sortase
- Pfam: PF04203
- InterPro: IPR005754
- SCOP2: 1ija / SCOPe / SUPFAM
- OPM superfamily: 294
- OPM protein: 1rz2
- CDD: cd00004
Available protein structures:
- PDB: IPR005754 PF04203 (ECOD; PDBsum)
- AlphaFold: IPR005754; PF04203

Sortase refers to a group of prokaryotic peptidases that modify surface proteins by recognizing and cleaving a carboxyl-terminal sorting signal. For most substrates of sortase enzymes, the recognition signal consists of the motif LPXTG (Leu-Pro-any-Thr-Gly), then a highly hydrophobic transmembrane sequence, followed by a cluster of basic residues such as arginine. Cleavage occurs between the Thr and Gly, with transient attachment through the Thr residue to the active site Cys residue, followed by transpeptidation that attaches the protein covalently to cell wall components. Sortases occur in almost all Gram-positive bacteria and the occasional Gram-negative bacterium (e.g. Shewanella putrefaciens) or Archaea (e.g. Methanobacterium thermoautotrophicum), where cell wall LPXTG-mediated decoration has not been reported. Although sortase A, the "housekeeping" sortase, typically acts on many protein targets, other forms of sortases recognize variant forms of the cleavage motif, or catalyze the assembly of pilins into pili.

== Reaction ==
The Staphylococcus aureus sortase is a transpeptidase that attaches surface proteins to the cell wall; it cleaves between the Gly and Thr of the LPXTG motif and catalyses the formation of an amide bond between the carboxyl-group of threonine and the amino-group of the cell-wall peptidoglycan.

== Biological role ==
Substrate proteins attached to cell walls by sortases include enzymes, pilins, and adhesion-mediating large surface glycoproteins. These proteins often play important roles in virulence, infection, and colonization by pathogens.

Surface proteins not only promote interaction between the invading pathogen and animal tissues, but also provide ingenious strategies for bacterial escape from the host's immune response. In the case of S. aureus protein A, immunoglobulins are captured on the microbial surface and camouflage bacteria during the invasion of host tissues. S. aureus mutants lacking the srtA gene fail to anchor and display some surface proteins and are impaired in the ability to cause animal infections. Sortase acts on surface proteins that are initiated into the secretion (Sec) pathway and have their signal peptide removed by signal peptidase. The S. aureus genome encodes two sets of sortase and secretion genes. It is conceivable that S. aureus has evolved more than one pathway for the transport of 20 surface proteins to the cell wall envelope.

Note that exosortase and archaeosortase are functionally analogous, while not in any way homologous to sortase.

== Pharmaceutic Applications ==
=== As an antibiotic target ===
The sortases are thought to be good targets for new antibiotics as they are important proteins for pathogenic bacteria and some limited commercial interest has been noted by at least one company.

=== Antibody Drug Conjugates ===
Antibody drug conjugates (ADCs) are composed of an antibody linked to a drug. Sortase can be used as a method to link these two molecules. Due to the site-specific ligation of sortase, it shows promise in being used as a method to create ADCs. Sortase poses a potential solution to the challenge of creating homogeneous ADCs where the drug is attached to a single specific site.

A study showed that sortase derived ADCs can effectively kill tumors both in vitro and in vivo. Using sortase to manufacture ADCs may be able to simplify the production and reduce materials needed for the process.

A challenge with using sortase for ADC preparation is the poor reaction kinetics of the natural enzyme. Using error prone PCR to generate mutants of SrtA, the most commonly used natural sortase variant, has been successful in generating more efficient sortase variants.

== Structure ==
This group of cysteine peptidases belong to MEROPS peptidase family C60 (clan C-) and include the members of several subfamilies of sortases.

Another sub-family of sortases (C60B in MEROPS) contains bacterial sortase B proteins that are approximately 200 residues long.

The protein cleaving and ligating function of the sortase enzyme is reliant on the structure of the enzyme binding site and the presence of the correct binding site on the target protein. The requirement of a binding motif limits the versatility of the sortase enzyme and requires the addition of a short protein tag in cases when the desired protein doesn't contain the necessary binding site.

=== Structural Variants ===
The most widely used sortase in biological and medical applications is the SrtA enzyme found in staphylococcus aureus bacteria, which recognizes an LPXTG binding motif. Different sortase enzymes found in staphylococcus and other bacteria have other recognition sequences. SrtB for example recognizes a NPQTN binding sequence. These other sortase variants have different properties including different binding motifs and reaction efficiencies.

To use the sortase enzyme in broader applications new variations of the enzyme have been developed to exhibit desired properties. SrtA variants that exhibit similar kinetics and catalytic efficiency to the wild type have been engineered using directed evolution. This process induces mutations in the natural enzyme and selects for mutations that result in the desired properties. SrtA variants have been developed with different binding motifs (LPXSG and LAXTG). Another sortase variant, eSrtA, was specifically developed to have improved kinetics, while still other variants were developed to operate in the absence of calcium.

=== Use in structural biology ===
The transpeptidase activity of sortase is taken advantage of by structural biologists to produce fusion proteins in vitro. The recognition motif (LPXTG) is added to the C-terminus of a protein of interest while an oligo-glycine motif is added to the N-terminus of the second protein to be ligated. Upon addition of sortase to the protein mixture, the two peptides are covalently linked through a native peptide bond. This reaction is employed by NMR spectroscopists to produce NMR invisible solubility tags and by X-ray crystallographers to promote complex formation.

== See also ==
- Protein tag
- Bioengineering
- SpyTag/SpyCatcher
- HaloTag
- Inteins
