= Rhodocyclaceae =

Scientific classification
- Domain: Bacteria
- Kingdom: Pseudomonadati
- Phylum: Pseudomonadota
- Class: Betaproteobacteria
- Order: Rhodocyclales
- Family: Rhodocyclaceae; Garrity et al. 2006

Genera
- "Candidatus Accumulibacter" Hesselmann et al. 1999; Azospira Reinhold-Hurek and Hurek 2000; Azovibrio Reinhold-Hurek and Hurek 2000; "Dechlorobacter" Thrash et al. 2010; Oryzomicrobium Liu et al. 2017; Propionivibrio Tanaka et al. 1991; "Candidatus Proximibacter" Petriglieri et al. 2022; Rhodocyclus Pfennig 1978 (Approved Lists 1980); Rugosibacter Corteselli et al. 2017; Viridibacterium Kang et al. 2025

Family of bacteria

The Rhodocyclaceae are a family of gram-negative bacteria. They are given their own order in the beta subgroup of Pseudomonadota, and include many genera previously assigned to the family Pseudomonadaceae.

The family was revised in 2017 with the creation of other families within the order Rhodocyclales, and the family now contains the genera:

- Rhodocyclus (type genus) species can grow photoheterotrophically or photoautotrophically (using molecular hydrogen as their electron donor) under anoxia or heterotrophically on fatty acids under air. Dominant respiratory quinone is rhodoquinone-8. Cells are curved rods or rings.
- Propionivibrio species grow anaerobically by fermentation of hydrocarbons, yielding fatty acids, specifically propionate. The dominant respiratory quinone is ubiquinone-8. Cells are curved rods.
- Azospira species are heterotrophs that can fix molecular nitrogen (i.e. are diazotrophic) as their source of nitrogen for growth. Cells are spirillae or curved rods. The dominant respiratory quinone is ubiquinone-8.
