= Zoogloeaceae =

Scientific classification
- Domain: Bacteria
- Kingdom: Pseudomonadati
- Phylum: Pseudomonadota
- Class: Betaproteobacteria
- Order: Rhodocyclales
- Family: Zoogloeaceae; Boden et al. 2017

Genera
- Aromatoleum; Azoarcus; Cognatazoarcus; Denitromonas; Epicystopsis; Nitrogeniibacter; Niveibacterium; Parazoarcus; Pseudozoarcus; Pseudothauera; Thauera; Ulignosibacterium; Zoogloea

Family of Bacteria

Zoogloeaceae is a family of bacteria in the order Rhodocyclales. In 2017, Boden et al. proposed the creation of Zoogloeaceae and Azonexaceae to harmonize the taxonomy with 16S rRNA gene-based phylogeny as well as physiology. The type genus, from whence the name is derived, is Zoogloea. In 2021, Huang et al. added four new genera to the family. At present, the family comprises 13 genera, with 44 sequenced genomes and 73 representative 16S rRNA gene sequences.

Zoogloeaceae is characterized by a rod shape and one or more flagella. Species are metabolically diverse and are implicated in nitrogen cycling.
