= Rhodocyclales =

- Two strains of Zoogloea resiniphila. Wild type is on the left. The right is a strain unable to form floc.

Scientific classification
- Domain: Bacteria
- Kingdom: Pseudomonadati
- Phylum: Pseudomonadota
- Class: Betaproteobacteria
- Order: Rhodocyclales; Boden et al. 2017 (Garrity, et al 2006)

Families
- Rhodocyclaceae; Azonexaceae; Zoogloeaceae

Order of bacteria

The Rhodocyclales are an order of the class Betaproteobacteria in the phylum Pseudomonadota ("Proteobacteria"). Following a major reclassification of the class in 2017, the previously monofamilial order was split into three families:

- Rhodocyclaceae (type family) contains the genera Rhodocyclus (type genus), Azospira and Propionivibrio. Cells are curved rods, rings or spirillae. Dominant respiratory quinones are menaquinone-8, ubiquinone-8 and rhodoquinone-8. G+C fractions are 61.6 - 65.3 mol%.
- Azonexaceae contains the genera Azonexus (type genus), Dechloromonas, Ferribacterium and Quatrionicoccus. Cells are curved rods or cocci. Dominant respiratory quinone is ubiquinone-8. G+C fractions are 63.5 - 67.0 mol%.
- Zoogloeaceae contains the genera Zoogloea (type genus), Thauera, Uliginosibacterium and Azoarcus. Cells are rod shaped. Dominant respiratory quinones are ubiquinone-8 and rhodoquinone-8. G+C fractions are 59.3 - 69.0 mol%.

The genus Azovibrio also falls within the order but is incertae sedis, falling between the Zoogloeaeceae and the Azonexaceae.
