= Microbial toxin =

Toxin produced by microorganisms

Microbial toxins are toxins produced by micro-organisms, including bacteria, fungi, protozoa, dinoflagellates, and viruses. Many microbial toxins promote infection and disease by directly damaging host tissues and by disabling the immune system. Endotoxins most commonly refer to the lipopolysaccharide (LPS) or lipooligosaccharide (LOS) that are in the outer plasma membrane of Gram-negative bacteria. The botulinum toxin, which is primarily produced by Clostridium botulinum and less frequently by other Clostridium species, is the most toxic substance known in the world. However, microbial toxins also have important uses in medical science and research. Currently, new methods of detecting bacterial toxins are being developed to better isolate and understand these toxins. Potential applications of toxin research include combating microbial virulence, the development of novel anticancer drugs and other medicines, and the use of toxins as tools in neurobiology and cellular biology.

== Bacterial ==
Bacteria toxins which can be classified as either exotoxins or endotoxins. Exotoxins are generated and actively secreted; endotoxins remain part of the bacteria. Usually, an endotoxin is part of the bacterial outer membrane, and it is not released until the bacterium is killed by the immune system. The body's response to an endotoxin can involve severe inflammation. In general, the inflammation process is usually considered beneficial to the infected host, but if the reaction is severe enough, it can lead to sepsis. Exotoxins are typically proteins with enzymatic activity that interfere with host cells triggering the symptoms associated with the disease. Exotoxins are also relatively specific to the bacteria that produce it; for example, diphtheria toxin is only produced by Corynebacterium diphtheriae bacteria and is required for the diphtheria disease. Some bacterial toxins can be used in the treatment of tumors. Endotoxins most commonly refer to the lipopolysaccharide (LPS) or lipooligosaccharide (LOS) that are in the outer plasma membrane of Gram-negative bacteria. Not all strains of a bacteria species are virulent; there are some strains of Corynebacterium diphtheriae that do not produce diphtheria toxin and are considered nonvirulent and nontoxigenic. Additional classifications used to describe toxins include enterotoxin, neurotoxin, leukocidin or hemolysin which indicate where in the host's body the toxin targets. Enterotoxins target the intestines, neurotoxins target neurons, leukocidin target leukocytes (white blood cells), and hemolysins target red blood cells. Exotoxin activity can be separated into specific cytotoxic activity or broad cytotoxic activity based on whether the toxin targets specific cell types or various cell types and tissues, respectively. Lethal toxins refers to the group of toxins that are the obvious agents responsible for death associated with the infection.

Toxinosis is pathogenesis caused by the bacterial toxin alone, not necessarily involving bacterial infection (e.g. when the bacteria have died, but have already produced toxin, which are ingested). It can be caused by Staphylococcus aureus toxins, for example.

=== Examples ===
==== Clostridial ====
There are over 200 Clostridium species in the world that live in mundane places such as soil, water, dust, and even our digestive tracts. Some of these species produce harmful toxins such as botulinum toxin and tetanus toxin among others. Most Clostridium species that do have toxins typically have AB toxins with part of the toxin involved in cellular entry and the other element delivering a toxic cargo, that is often an enzyme into the cell. Clostridial toxins are widespread and are common causes of disease in humans and other organisms.

Clostridioides difficile

Toxin A and Toxin B are the two major toxins produced by Clostridioides difficile. Toxin A and toxin B are glucosyltransferases that cause the antibiotic-associated pseudomembranous colitis and severe diarrhea that characterize disease presentation of Clostridioides difficile infections. The binary toxin toxin CDT is also produced by some strains of C. difficile.

===== Botulinum =====
Botulinum neurotoxins (BoNTs) are the causative agents of the deadly food poisoning disease botulism, and could pose a major biological warfare threat due to their extreme toxicity and ease of production. They also serve as powerful tools to treat an ever expanding list of medical conditions that benefit from its paralytic properties, an example drug with BoNTs as the active ingredient is Botox. TBotulinum neurotoxins (BoNTs) are protein neurotoxins that are produced by the bacteria Clostridium. BoNTs are now largely being studied due to their ability to aid in chronic inflammatory diseases such as acne, multiple sclerosis, and for cosmetic purposes.

===== Tetanus =====
Clostridium tetani produces tetanus toxin (TeNT protein), which leads to a fatal condition known as tetanus in many vertebrates (including humans). Tetanus toxin is produced from Clostridium tetani, a spore forming bacteria commonly found in soil, Tetanus is a paralytic disease that commonly affects newborns and non-immunized individuals. Tetanus enters the body of organisms through wounds or skin breaks and can be found in manure, soil, and dust. Tetanus mechanism includes tetanus preventing the transmission of glycine and γ-aminobutyric acid from inhibitory interneurons in the spinal cord, leading to activation of motor neurons causing contraction (known as spastic paralysis). It can also cause dysautonomia through a similar process that leads to autonomic dysinhibition. When tetanus toxin enters the body it is taken up by cholinergic nerve endings travel through axons into the spinal cord, the toxin is subsequently released from motor neurons and reuptaken into inhibitory nerve terminals triggering loss of inhibition and exaggerated reflexes in intoxicated individuals. Tetanus intoxication is a vaccine preventable illness.

==== Perfringolysin O toxin ====
Clostridium perfringens is an anaerobic, gram-positive bacteria that is often found in the large and small intestines of humans and other animals. Clostridium perfringens has the ability to reproduce quickly producing toxins relating to the cause of diseases. The pore-forming toxin perfringolysin has the ability to cause gangrene in calves with the presence of alpha toxin.

==== Staphylococcal ====
Immune evasion proteins from Staphylococcus aureus have a significant conservation of protein structures and a range of activities that are all directed at the two key elements of host immunity, complement and neutrophils. These secreted virulence factors assist the bacterium in surviving immune response mechanisms.

Examples of toxins produced by strains of S. aureus include enterotoxins that cause food-poisoning, exfoliative toxins that cause scalded skin syndrome, and toxic-shock syndrome toxin (TSST) that underlies toxic shock syndrome. These toxin examples are classified as superantigens.

Multi-drug resistant S. aureus strains also produce alpha toxin, classified as a pore-forming toxin, which can cause abscesses.

==== Shiga ====
Shiga toxins (Stxs), responsible for foodborne illnesses, are a classification of toxins produced by Shiga toxin-producing Escherichia coli (STEC) and Shigella dysenteriae serotype 1. Stx was first identified in S. dysenteriae and was later found to be produced by certain strains of E. coli. Stxs act through inhibiting protein synthesis of infected cells and can be divided into two antigenically different groups: Stx/Stx1 and Stx2. Stx1 is immunologically equivalent to Stx; however, it received a separate name to indicate that it is produced by STEC and not S. dysenteriae. Stx2 is produced only by STEC and is antigenically different from Stx/Stx1. The term shiga-like toxins was previously used to further distinguish the shiga toxins produced by E. coli, but nowadays, they are collectively referred to as shiga toxins. Within the STEC strains, a subgroup classified as enterohemorrhagic E. coli (EHEC) represent a class of pathogens with more severe virulence factors in addition to the ability to produce Stxs. EHEC infections result in more severe diseases of hemorrhagic colitis and hemolytic uremic syndrome. There are around 200 strains of STEC, and the wide range of diversity and virulence between them can be partly attributed to phage-mediated horizontal transfer of genetic material.

==== Anthrax toxin ====
Anthrax disease in humans results from infection with toxin producing Bacillus anthracis strains that can be inhaled, ingested in contaminated food or drink, or obtained through breaks in the skin like cuts or scrapes. Domestic and wild animals can also be infected via inhalation or ingestion. Depending on the route of entry, disease can present initially as inhalation anthrax, cutaneous anthrax, or gastrointestinal anthrax, but eventually will spread throughout the body, resulting in death, if not treated with antibiotics. Anthrax toxin is composed of three domains: protective antigen (PA), edema factor (EF), and lethal factor (LF). EF is an adenylate cyclase that targets ATP. LF enzyme is a metalloprotease that confers the lethal phenotype associated with anthrax disease. As LF is the agent responsible for the death of infected hosts, it is classified in the group of lethal toxins.

==== Diphtheria toxin ====
Diphtheria toxin is produced by virulent Corynebacterium diphtheriae that infect the mucosal membranes of the throat and nasal cavity causing a gray, thickened lining of the throat, sore throat, weakness, mild fever, swollen glands of the neck, and difficulty breathing. Diphtheria toxin is an ADP-ribosyltransferase that inhibits protein synthesis which causes the symptoms associated with the disease. Diphtheria used to be a leading cause of childhood death until the creation of a vaccine. The diphtheria vaccine contains a diphtheria toxoid, antigenically identical yet inactivated and non-toxic. When the toxoid is introduced to the body in a vaccine, an immune response is mounted without sequelae associated with the toxigenicity.

==== Pertussis toxin ====
Pertussis toxin is produced by virulent Bordetella pertussis and is responsible for the disease of whooping cough, a respiratory disease that can be fatal for infants. The severe, uncontrollable coughing makes it difficult to breathe causing the "whooping" sound that occurs with inhalation. Bordetella pertussis targets cilia of the upper respiratory tract which are damaged by the pertussis toxin, an ADP-ribosyltransferase that targets G-proteins.

==== Cholera toxin ====
Cholera, characterized by copious watery diarrhea, is a potentially life-threatening illness transmitted through the fecal–oral route via food or water contaminated with toxigenic Vibrio cholerae. V. cholerae targets the intestines and secretes cholera toxin, an exotoxin and potent enterotoxin that acts as an ADP-ribosyltransferase targeting G-proteins. This causes an increase in intracellular cAMP and forces intestinal cells to expel significant amounts of water and electrolytes into the lumen.

==== Listeriolysin O toxin ====
Listeriolysin O toxin is an exotoxin produced by Listeria monocytogenes and is associated with foodborne systemic illness and meningitis. Listeriolysin O toxin is classified as a pore-forming toxin that targets host cholesterol cells, inserting a pore into the host cell plasma membrane and permanently disabling cellular functioning.

==== Lipopolysaccharides (LPS) ====
Lipopolysaccharides (LPS) produced by gram-negative bacteria are an example of endotoxins. LSP are structural components of the bacteria's outer membrane that only become toxic to the host as a result of the immune system's destruction of the bacteria cell membrane.

==== BMAA ====
β-Methylamino-L-alanine (BMAA) is a neurotoxin produced by cyanobacteria that live in the roots of cycads. BMAA may be present in starch made from the stems and/or seeds of cycads (such as Florida arrowroot flour) that has not been sufficiently washed, or in meat from animals that have eaten cycads.

== Detection methods in fresh water environments ==
The most prominent natural toxin groups that exist in aquatic environments are mycotoxins, algal toxins, bacterial toxins, and plant toxins (8). These marine biotoxins are dangerous to human health and have been widely studied due to their high potential to bioaccumulate in edible parts of seafood.

Autotrophic bacteria and algae are unrelated organisms; however, in aquatic environments, they are both primary producers. Cyanobacteria are an important autotrophic bacteria in the water food web. Explosions of cyanobacteria known as algal blooms can produce cyanotoxins harmful to both the ecosystem and human health. These harmful algal blooms are more likely to be produced at a dangerous amount when there is an excess of nutrients, the temperature is 20 °C, there is more light, and calmer waters. Eutrophication and other contamination can lead to an environment that promotes cyanobacteria blooms. Processes that promote an excess of nutrients, and human activities, such as agricultural runoff and sewage overflows, are primarily responsible. Other factors include algal species and grazers being in higher concentrations, allowing for an abundance of cyanobacterial organisms that are associated with the production of toxins. Detection of the extent of an algal bloom begins by taking samples of water at various depths and locations in the bloom.

=== Solid-phase adsorption toxin tracking (SPATT) ===
SPATT was introduced in 2004 as a method of monitoring aquatic toxins. This tool is able to adsorb toxins generated by microalgae or cyanobacteria, known as cyanotoxins. The adsorption is passive, and the biotoxins adhere to porous, resin filled sachets, or SPATT bags where they are then physically removed and examined.

SPATT is a useful tool in tracking algal blooms as it is reliable, sensitive, and inexpensive. It has the ability to quickly alert the existence of aquatic toxins which prevents it from bioaccumulating in marine life. One of the downsides is that it does not give very good results for water-soluble toxins as compared to hydrophobic compounds. This tool is mainly used to determine intercellular concentrations of toxins but the cyanobacteria can also be lysed to determine the total toxin amount in a sample. Other drawbacks, such as a lack in calibration and the ability to only monitor dissolved toxins, make it difficult for this tool to be implemented in a more widespread manner. However, SPATT devices are able to detect many lipophilic and hydrophilic toxins that are linked to harmful algal bloom.

=== Polymerase chain reaction (PCR) ===
PCR is a molecular tool that allows for analysis of genetic information. PCR is used to amplify the amount of certain DNA within a sample which are usually specific genes within a sample. Genetic targets for cyanobacteria in PCR include the 16S ribosomal RNA gene, phycocyanin operon, internal transcribed spacer region, and the RNA polymerase β subunit gene. PCR is effective when the gene of a known enzyme for producing the microbial toxin or the microbial toxin itself is known. One type of PCR is real time PCR also called quantitative PCR. This type of PCR uses fluorescence and then does an analysis by measuring the amount of fluorescence that reflects the DNA sample more specifically nucleic acids at specific times. Another type of PCR is digital PCR that looks at nucleic acid quantifications. Digital PCR uses dilutions and samples from microlitre reactions to achieve a more accurate quantification of nucleic acids. This type offers a more linear analysis by looking at the positive and negative reactions. Both PCR's are beneficial but there are advantages and disadvantages for both. The digital PCR has several advantages over real time PCR which includes no standard curve, more precise, less affected by simple inhibitors. Digital also has disadvantages to real time which is limited reaction mixture time, more complex and high risk of contamination.

=== Enzyme inhibition ===
There are many diverse ways of monitoring enzyme levels through the use of enzyme inhibition. The general principle in many of these is the use the knowledge that many enzymes are driven by phosphate-releasing compounds such as adenosine triphosphate. Using radiolabelled ^{32}P phosphate a fluorometric analysis can be used. Or unique polymers can be used to immobilize enzymes and act in an electrochemical biosensor. Overall, the benefits include a fast response time and little sample preparation. Some of the downsides include a lack of specificity in terms of being able to get readings of very small amounts of toxin and the rigidity of the assays in apply certain procedures to different toxins.

=== Immunochemical methods ===
This detection method uses mammalian antibodies to bind to microbial toxins which can then be processed in a variety of different ways. Of the commercial ways of using immunochemical detection would be enzyme-linked immunosorbent assays (ELISA). This assay has the advantage of being able to screen for a broad range of toxins but could have issues with specificity depending on the antibody used. A more exotic setup involves the use of CdS quantum dots which are used in an electro-chemiluminescent immunosensor. A major aspect of immunochemical methods being tested in laboratories are uses of nanowires and other nanomaterials to detect microbial toxins.

== Tetrodotoxins ==
These toxins are produced by Vibrio species of bacteria and like to accumulate in marine life such as the pufferfish. These toxins are produced when Vibrio bacteria are stressed by changes in temperature and salinity of environment which leads towards production of toxins. The main hazard towards humans is during consumption of contaminated seafood. Tetrodotoxin poisoning is becoming common in more northern and typically colder marine waters as higher precipitation and warmer waters from climate change triggers Vibrio bacteria to produce toxins. Most of the marine life that produce this toxin are typically found in warm water, for example the Red Sea and the Mediterranean Sea. For example, pufferfish do produce this toxin, some pufferfish, such as Takifugu V., produce tetrodotoxin in their skin glands. Another organism that releases the tetrodotoxin from their skin are blue-ringed octopuses (Hapalochlaena fasciata). The Natica lineata snails produce the tetrodotoxin and store it in the muscle. The snail releases the toxin by absorbing water into the muscle cavity and it is released when the snail is attacked. Once a human consumes the toxin, the individual could experience mild symptoms such as paresthesias of the lips or tongue, vomiting and headaches. The individual could also experience severe symptoms such as respiratory or heart failure. At this time there is no treatment for tetrodotoxin poisoning other than respiratory support.

== Viral toxin ==
=== Rotavirus NSP4 ===
There is only one viral toxin that has been described so far: NSP4 from rotavirus. It inhibits the microtubule-mediated secretory pathway and alters cytoskeleton organization in polarized epithelial cells. It has been identified as the viral enterotoxin based on the observation that the protein caused diarrhea when administered intraperitoneally or intra-ileally in infant mice in an age-dependent manner. NSP4 can induce aqueous secretion in the gastrointestinal tract of neonatal mice through activation of an age- and Ca^{2+}-dependent plasma membrane anion permeability.

=== Virus involvement in toxigenicity ===
Several bacteriophages contain toxin genes that become incorporated into the host bacteria genome through infection and render the bacteria toxic. Many well known bacterial toxins are produced from specific strains of the bacteria species that have obtained toxigenicity through lysogenic conversion, pseudolysogeny, or horizontal gene transfer. Although these are not viral toxins, researchers remain extremely interested in the role phages play bacterial toxins due to their contribution to pathogenesis (toxigenesis), virulence, transmissibility and general evolution of bacteria. Examples of toxins encoded by phage genes:

- Cholera toxins: encoded by CTX phages, virulent Vibrio cholerae strains require lysogenic conversion by CTX phage infection
- Several botulinum toxins (BoNTs): Type C and D BoNTS have been shown to be encoded by clostridial phages and are produced by Clostridium botulinum strains harboring these phage genes
- Shiga toxins: encoded by lambdoid phages, mainly produced by lysogenic shiga-toxin producing strains of E. coli (STEC)
- Diphtheria toxins: encoded by corynephage ß, produced by lysogenic Corynebacterium diphtheriae strains infected with corynephage ß
- Several staphylococci toxins (staphylokinase (SAK), staphylococcal enterotoxin A (SEA), exfoliative toxin (ETA), Panton–Valentine leucocidin (PVL), and other enterotoxins): toxins that are phage-encoded and produced by lysogenic converted strains of the staphylococci group.

==== Mycoviruses ====
Some mycoviruses also contain toxin genes expressed by host fungal species upon viral infection. While these toxins are classified as mycotoxins, the role of mycoviruses is also of interest to researchers in terms of fungal virulence. Examples include the mycoviruses ScV-M1, ScV-M2, and ScV-M28 in the Totiviridae family that contain "killer toxin" genes K1, K2, and K3, respectively. These "killer toxins" are produced by yeast, namely of the Saccharomyces cerevisiae species, that destroy neighboring yeast cells. Recently, researchers discovered that it is only the yeasts infected with either ScV-M1, ScV-M2, or ScV-M28 mycoviruses that have the ability to produce a "killer toxin".

== Mycotoxins ==
Mycotoxins are secondary metabolites that are constructed by microfungi. Mycotoxins can be harmful because they can cause disease and death in humans and animals. They are found in many pharmaceuticals like antibiotics and growth developments. Mycotoxins can also play a role in chemical warfare agents (CWA), which are chemicals that contain toxins that are used to cause death, harm, or injuries to individuals that are considered enemies by the military during warfare.

Mycotoxins are synthesized by different types of moulds and are built by a wide group of toxins. Mycotoxins have a low molecular weight compound that is usually less than 1000 grams per mol. There are roughly 400 toxic mycotoxins that are constructed by 100 different fungi species that have been researched. Mycotoxins gain access into the body of a human or animal by food, they can contaminate many different types of agriculture during cultivation, harvesting, storage, and areas with high humidity. The Food and Agriculture Organization reported that about 25% of products produced by agriculture contain mycotoxins and this can lead to economic losses in the agricultural community. Levels of mycotoxin secretion can rely on varying temperatures, the ideal temperature for mycotoxins to grow is from 20 degrees Celsius to 37 degrees Celsius. Mycotoxin production also relies heavily on water activity, the ideal range would be from 0.83 to 0.9 aw and higher. Humidity plays a key in the production of mycotoxins as well. Higher levels of humidity (between 70% and 90%) and moisture (between 20% and 25%) allow mycotoxins to grow more rapidly. Foods that mycotoxins are found in cereal, spices, and seeds. They can also be found in eggs, milk, and meat from animals that have been contaminated during their feeding process. Since they are resistant to high temperatures and physical and chemical reception, it is considered unavoidable while cooking at high temperatures.

=== Types ===
Trichothecene is a mycotoxin that is produced from the fungi species Fusarium graminearum. The T-2 toxin, Type A, and DON, Type B, are major mycotoxins that are responsible for toxicity in humans and animals. These two types come from an epoxide at the C12 and C13 positions in the trichothecenes. The T-2 toxin was found after civilians ate wheat that was contaminated by the Fusarium fungi during WWII from a biological weapon. The T-2 toxin was an outbreak and made humans develop symptoms like food poisoning, chills, nausea, dizziness, etc. The trichothecenes mycotoxin affects animals by decreasing plasma glucose, red blood cell and leukocyte counts. Pathological changes in the liver and stomach, as well as weight loss has been accounted for.

Zearalenone is a mycotoxin that is produced from Fusarium graminearum and Fusarium culmorum that are found in different types of foods and feeds. Zearalenone is a non-steroidal estrogenic mycotoxin that is found in farm animal's reproductive disorders and in humans it causes hypoestrogenic syndrome. Effects that come from zearalenone include enlarged uterus, improperly running reproductive tract, decreasing the fertility in women, and causes progesterone and estradiol levels to become abnormal. If zearalenone is consumed during pregnancy, it can cause reduced fetal weight and decrease the chance of survival for the embryo.

Fumonisins, Fusarium verticillioides, are found in nature where fumonisin B1 has largely contaminated the area. These mycotoxins are hydrophilic compounds. Studies have shown that esophageal cancer can be related back to corn grain that contains fumonisins. Other effects from fumonisins are birth defects of the brain, spine, and spinal cord. In animals, problems with the pulmonary edema and hydrothorax swines have been proven to have association with fumonisins.

Ochratoxin is a mycotoxin that is produced by Aspergillus species and Penicillium species. The most researched ochratoxin is the ochratoxin A (OTA), which is a fungal toxin. This mycotoxin targets the OTA of kidneys and causes kidney disease in humans. Ochratoxin A is an immunosuppressive compound. Ochratoxin is a renal carcinogen, which has been found by animals containing OTA.

Aflatoxin is a mycotoxin that is produced from Aspergillus flavus and Aspergillus parasiticus. A type of aflatoxin, AFB1, is the most common mycotoxin that is found in human food and animal feed. AFB1 targets the liver of both humans and animals. Acute aflatoxicosis can make humans and animals have symptoms like abdominal pain, vomiting, and even death.

== See also ==
- Alpha toxin
- Dinotoxin
- Shiga-like toxin
- Umbrella toxin
