= Alpha-toxin =

Alpha-toxin may refer to:

- Staphylococcus aureus alpha toxin, a toxin
- Clostridium novyi alpha-toxin, a toxin
- Lecithinase C, an enzyme
