= Nanopore =

Pore of nanometer size

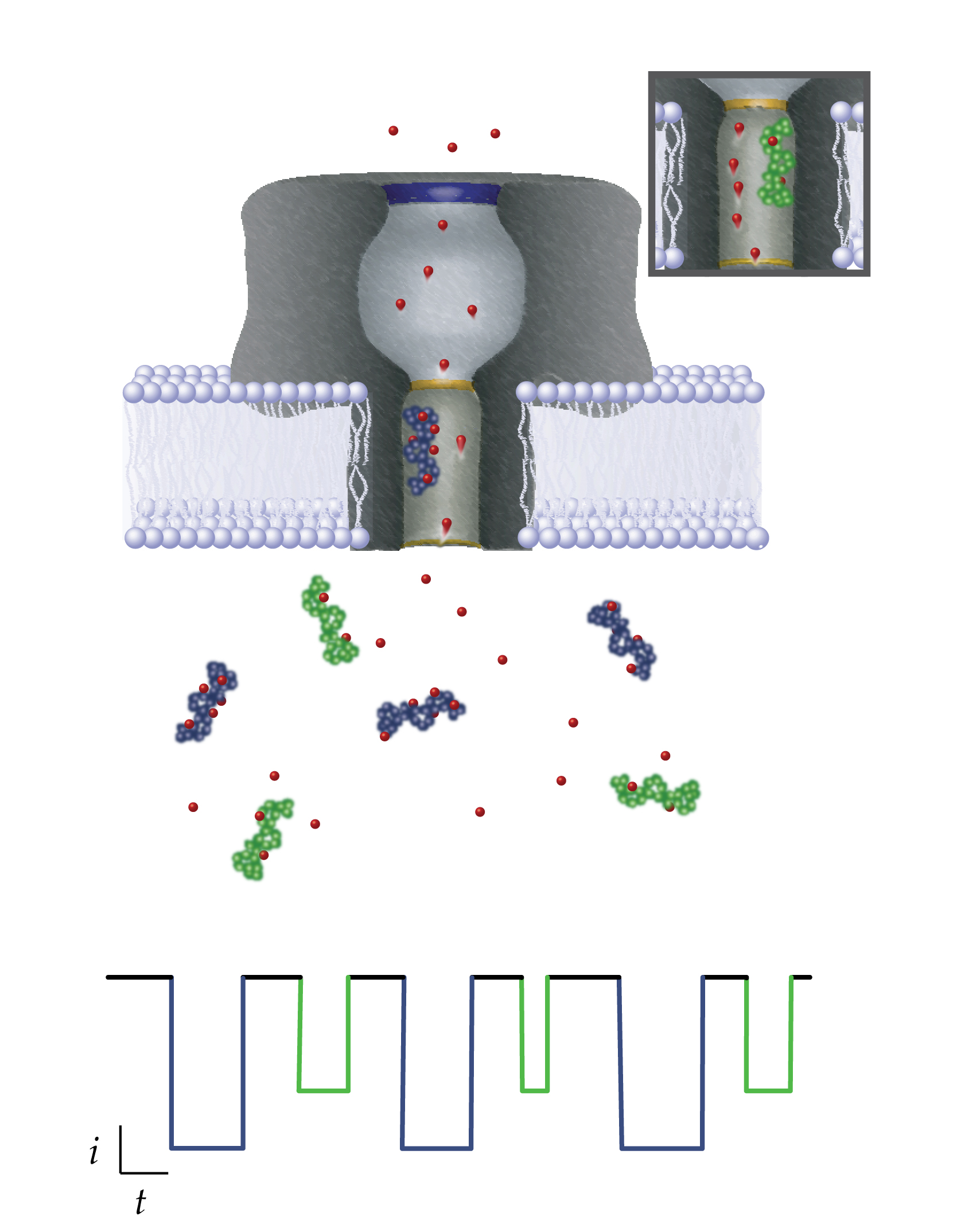
Schematic of Nanopore Internal Machinery and corresponding current blockade during sequencing

A nanopore is a pore of nanometer size. It may, for example, be created by a pore-forming protein or as a hole in synthetic materials such as silicon or graphene.

When a nanopore is present in an electrically insulating membrane, it can be used as a single-molecule detector. It can be a biological protein channel in a high electrical resistance lipid bilayer, a pore in a solid-state membrane or a hybrid of these – a protein channel set in a synthetic membrane. The detection principle is based on monitoring the ionic current passing through the nanopore as a voltage is applied across the membrane. When the nanopore is of molecular dimensions, passage of molecules (e.g., DNA) cause interruptions of the "open" current level, leading to a "translocation event" signal. The passage of RNA or single-stranded DNA molecules through the membrane-embedded alpha-hemolysin channel (1.5 nm diameter), for example, causes a ~90% blockage of the current (measured at 1 M KCl solution).

It may be considered a Coulter counter for much smaller particles.

== Types ==
=== Organic/Biological ===
- Nanopores may be formed by pore-forming proteins, typically a hollow core passing through a mushroom-shaped protein molecule. Examples of pore-forming proteins are alpha hemolysin, aerolysin, and MspA porin. In typical laboratory nanopore experiments, a single protein nanopore is inserted into a lipid bilayer membrane and single-channel electrophysiology measurements are taken. Newer pore-forming proteins have been extracted from bacteriophages and from different other organisms for study into their use as nanopores. These pores are generally selected due to their diameter being above 2 nm, the diameter of double-stranded DNA.
- Larger nanopores can be up to 20 nm in a diameter. These pores allow small molecules like oxygen, glucose and insulin to pass however they prevent large immune system molecules like immunoglobins from passing. As an example, rat pancreatic cells are microencapsulated, they receive nutrients and release insulin through nanopores being totally isolated from their neighboring environment i.e. foreign cells. This knowledge can help to replace nonfunctional islets of Langerhans cells in the pancreas (responsible for producing insulin), by harvested piglet cells. They can be implanted underneath the human skin without the need of immunosuppressants which put diabetic patients at a risk of infection.

=== Inorganic/Solid-state ===
- Solid-state nanopores are generally made in silicon compound membranes, one of the most common being silicon nitride. The second type of widely used solid-state nanopores are glass nanopores fabricated by laser-assisted pulling of glass capillary. Solid-state nanopores can be manufactured with several techniques including ion-beam sculpting, dielectric breakdown, electron beam exposure using TEM and Ion track etching. A detailed protocol for solid state nanopore fabrication for anyone new to this field can be found here.
- More recently, the use of graphene as a material for solid-state nanopore sensing has been explored. Another example of solid-state nanopores is a box-shaped graphene (BSG) nanostructure. The BSG nanostructure is a multilayer system of parallel hollow nanochannels located along the surface and having quadrangular cross-section. The thickness of the channel walls is approximately equal to 1 nm. The typical width of channel facets makes about 25 nm.
- Size-tunable elastomeric nanopores have been fabricated, allowing accurate measurement of nanoparticles as they occlude the flow of ionic current. This measurement methodology can be used to measure a wide range of particle types. In contrast to the limitations of solid-state pores, they allow for the optimization of the resistance pulse magnitude relative to the background current by matching the pore-size closely to the particle-size. As detection occurs on a particle by particle basis, the true average and polydispersity distribution can be determined. Using this principle, the world's only commercial tunable nanopore-based particle detection system has been developed by Izon Science Ltd. The box-shaped graphene (BSG) nanostructure can be used as a basis for building devices with changeable pore sizes.

== Nanopore based sequencing ==
The observation that a passing strand of DNA containing different bases corresponds with shifts in current values has led to the development of nanopore sequencing. Nanopore sequencing can occur with bacterial nanopores as mentioned in the above section as well as with the Nanopore sequencing device(s) created by Oxford Nanopore Technologies.

== Monomer identification ==
From a fundamental standpoint, nucleotides from DNA or RNA are identified based on shifts in current as the strand is entering the pore. In the approach that Oxford Nanopore Technologies uses for nanopore DNA sequencing, labeled DNA sample is loaded to the flow cell within the nanopore. The DNA fragment is guided to the nanopore and commences the unfolding of the helix. As the unwound helix moves through the nanopore, it is correlated with a change in the current value which is measured in thousand times per second. Nanopore analysis software can take this alternating current value for each base detected, and obtain the resulting DNA sequence. Similarly with the usage of biological nanopores, as a constant voltage is applied to the system, the alternating current can be observed. As DNA, RNA or peptides enter the pore, shifts in the current can be observed through this system that are characteristic of the monomer being identified.

Ion current rectification (ICR) is an important phenomenon for nanopore. Ion current rectification can also be used as a drug sensor and be employed to investigate charge status in the polymer membrane.

== Applications to nanopore sequencing ==
Apart from rapid DNA sequencing, other applications include separation of single stranded and double stranded DNA in solution, and the determination of length of polymers. At this stage, nanopores are making contributions to the understanding of polymer biophysics, single-molecule analysis of DNA-protein interactions, as well as peptide sequencing. When it comes to peptide sequencing bacterial nanopores like hemolysin, can be applied to both RNA, DNA and most recently protein sequencing. Such as when applied in a study in which peptides with the same Glycine-Proline-Proline repeat were synthesized, and then put through nanopore analysis, an accurate sequence was able to be attained. This can also be used to identify differences in stereochemistry of peptides based on intermolecular ionic interactions. Some configuration changes of protein could also be observed from the translocation curve. Understanding this also contributes more data to understanding the sequence of the peptide fully in its environment. Usage of another bacterial derived nanopore, an aerolysin nanopore, has shown ability having shown similar ability in distinguishing residues within a peptide has also shown the ability to identify toxins present even in proclaimed "very pure" protein samples, while demonstrating stability over varying pH values. A limitation to the usage of bacterial nanopores would be that peptides as short as six residues were accurately detected, but with larger more negatively charged peptides resulted in more background signal that is not representative of the molecule.

== Nanopore as biosensors ==
Nanopore are not only used for the sequencing of DNA, they are also used for the detection of many different biological entities from small molecules to large protein assemblies. Historically, alpha hemolysin was the first pore to demonstrate the potential of detecting the translocation (passage through the pore) of DNA and RNA strands. Nowadays, a whole array of both inorganic and biological nanopore are used for the detection of small molecules, peptides, proteins, biopolymers and sugars. These molecules are usually:

- Biological biomarker for disease (such as neurodegenerative diseases)
- Environmental monitoring of water for micropollutants, pesticides or (cyano)toxins
- Food safety
- Metabolite monitoring
- Digital polymer for data storage

These applications make nanopore a very versatile platform to analyse in real-time these (bio)molecules compared to other state-of-the-art methods requiring more complex instruments and more time to obtain similar results. As a results, many patents have filed to use nanopore as novel methods for the detection of many of the biomolecules mentioned.

== Alternate applications ==
Since the discovery of track-etched technology in the late 1960s, filter membranes with needed diameter have found application potential in various fields including food safety, environmental pollution, biology, medicine, fuel cell, and chemistry. These track-etched membranes are typically made in polymer membrane through track-etching procedure, during which the polymer membrane is first irradiated by heavy ion beam to form tracks and then cylindrical pores or asymmetric pores are created along the track after wet etching.

As important as fabrication of the filter membranes with proper diameters, characterizations and measurements of these materials are of the same paramount. Until now, a few of methods have been developed, which can be classified into the following categories according to the physical mechanisms they exploited: imaging methods such as scanning electron microscopy (SEM), transmission electron microscopy (TEM), atomic force microscopy (AFM); fluid transport such as bubble point and gas transport; fluid adsorptions such as nitrogen adsorption/desorption (BEH), mercury porosimetry, liquid-vapor equilibrium (BJH), gas-liquid equilibrium (permoporometry) and liquid-solid equilibrium (thermoporometry); electronic conductance; ultrasonic spectroscopy; and molecular transport.

More recently, the use of light transmission technique as a method for nanopore size measurement has been proposed.

Also, another proposal for utilising electric field sensing for improving nanopore technology has been made, known as Nanopore Electrometry, using Multiphysics and Molecular Dynamics simulations. This proposed to have several advantages such as error correction, rich information capacity for molecular characteristics compared to ionic current sensing, selective sensing base on the change, simultaneous and correlated measurements of the translocation event...etc.

== See also ==
- Coulomb blockade
- Electrophysiology
- Hemolysin
- MspA
- Aerolysin
- Nanofluidics
- Nanometre
- Nanopore sequencing
- Nanoporous materials
- Pore-forming toxin
