= Oleg Vladimirovich Krasilnikov =

Biophysicist

- Олег Владимирович Красильников
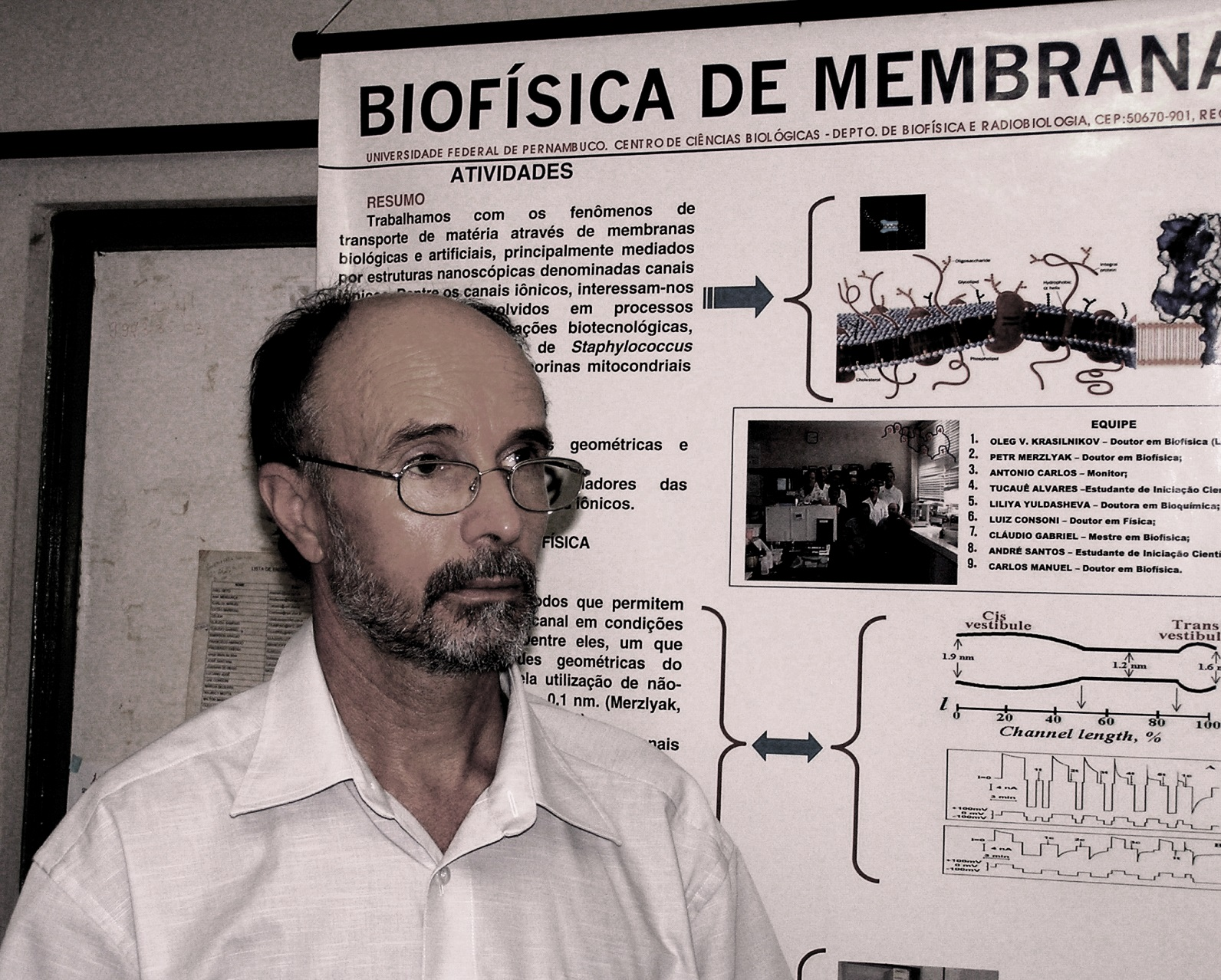
- Oleg Vladimirovich Krasilnikov in 2005, UFPE, LBM
- Born: Oleg Vladimirovich Krasilnikov; 14 September 1950; Sulukta, Kirghiz Soviet Socialist Republic
- Died: 30 August 2011 (aged 60); Recife, Pernambuco, Brazil
- Citizenship: Soviet Union (1950–1993) → Uzbekistan (1993–2011)
- Education: Tashkent State University
- Known for: ion channel
- Scientific career
- Fields: Biophysics

Oleg Vladimirovich Krasilnikov (14 September 1950 – 30 August 2011) was a Soviet-born biophysicist who lived and worked in Uzbekistan and Brazil. His father, Vladimir Sergeyevich Krasilnikov, was a mining engineer who worked in the coal mines of Kyrgyzstan (Sulukta and Tash Kumyr). His mother, Ekatherine Yakovlevna Krasilnikova, was an economist.

== Education ==
Oleg Vladimirovich Krasilnikov received his M.S. in biophysics from Tashkent State University(TashGU)(now National University of Uzbekistan) (1973), Uzbekistan). He completed his Ph.D. in biophysics at the Uzbekistan Institute of Biochemistry (The Academy of Sciences of Uzbekistan)(1977). His Ph.D. thesis was devoted to the subject “The influence of cytotoxin and phospholipase of Central Asian cobra venom on artificial and natural membranes.” And a D.Sci in biophysics was defended by the topic “Protein channels in a lipid bilayer” from Moscow State University of the Russian Academy of Sciences (1983).

== Career ==
Krasilnikov began his career in 1973 as a researcher at the Institute of Biochemistry of Uzbekistan in Tashkent. In 1992, he joined the Institute of Physiology and Biophysics at the Academy of Sciences of Uzbekistan (ASU) and in 1989 became the Chief of the Laboratory of Molecular Physiology at this institute. He was awarded the title of Full Professor in 1993.

Krasilnikov moved to Recife, Brazil in 1993 as a visiting researcher of CAPES, then - CNPq, at the Federal University of Pernambuco (UFPE). In 1998, he joined the Biophysics and Radiobiology Department as a visiting professor. The following year he became the Chief of the Biological Membrane Laboratory, where he promoting research until 2011. In Brazil, Krasilnikov studied the Portuguese language and began to use it in lectures for undergraduate and graduate students. Starting in 2002, he regularly taught biophysics at UFPE, where he was awarded the title of Professor Titular in 2011. He was a member of the Biophysical Societies of Brazil and the United States. He held fellowships from the Brazilian National Council for Scientific and Technological Development (CNPq) for many years.

Krasilnikov authored more than 100 scientific papers, published in international journals, plus one monograph, and two patents. He participated in many international meetings and chaired some workshops. After 1981, his laboratory became known for experiments on channels induced in membranes by bacterial pore-forming toxins of the Staphylococcus aureus, Bacillus cereus, Shigella, Pasteurella - reconstituted in planar lipid bilayers (principally α-staphylotoxin because of its unique ability to recognize polymer molecules that passed through it, that was used later by Oxford Nanopore technologies for DNA nanopore sequencing). His research was strongly based on the study of the pore-forming transmembrane proteins. He developed new experimental methods to study internal physical properties and geometry of functioning ion channels (diameter, internal structure). His group developed a method of sizing ion channels by comparing them with the diameters of known polymers - polyethylene glycols (nonelectrolyte exclusion method). The diameters of the functioning toxins such as Bacillus anthracis, Staphylococcus aureus, Cholera toxin and others were measured. This line of research served as the basis for development of new approaches to study functional ion channels in vitro and in vivo using patch-clamp assays.

Krasilnikov mentored 10 Ph.D. students, 1 Dr. Sci student, and 26 M.S. students in Biophysics. Two conferences dedicated to him - "Electrophysiology — theory and practice" - were held at the Biological Center of the Federal University of Pernambuco (CCB, UFPE) in 2013 and 2014. The h-index for his publications is 21.

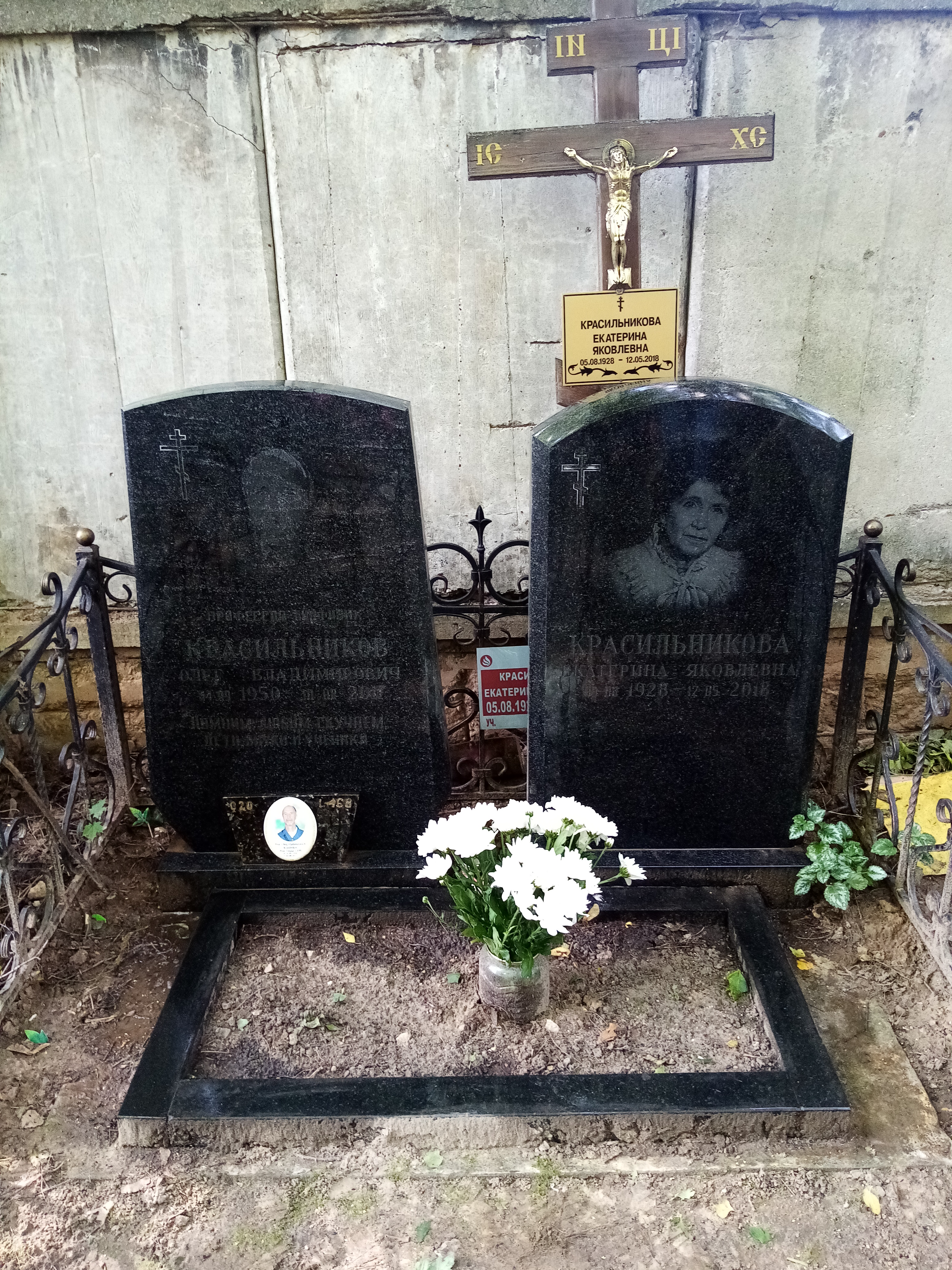
Oleg Krasilnikov's grave at Vladykinskoye Cemetery in Moscow

== See also ==
- Lipid bilayer
- Transmembrane protein
- Patch clamp
- Pore-forming toxin
