= Lysenin =

Toxin found in earthworms

Lysenin is a pore-forming toxin (PFT) present in the coelomic fluid of the earthworm Eisenia fetida. Pore-forming toxins are a group of proteins that act as virulence factors of several pathogenic bacteria. Lysenin proteins are chiefly involved in the defense against cellular pathogens. Following the general mechanism of action of PFTs lysenin is segregated as a soluble monomer that binds specifically to a membrane receptor, sphingomyelin in the case of lysenin. After attaching to the membrane, the oligomerization begins, resulting in a nonamer on top of membrane, known as a prepore. After a conformational change, which could be triggered by a decrease of pH, the oligomer is inserted into the membrane in the so-called pore state.

== Monomer ==
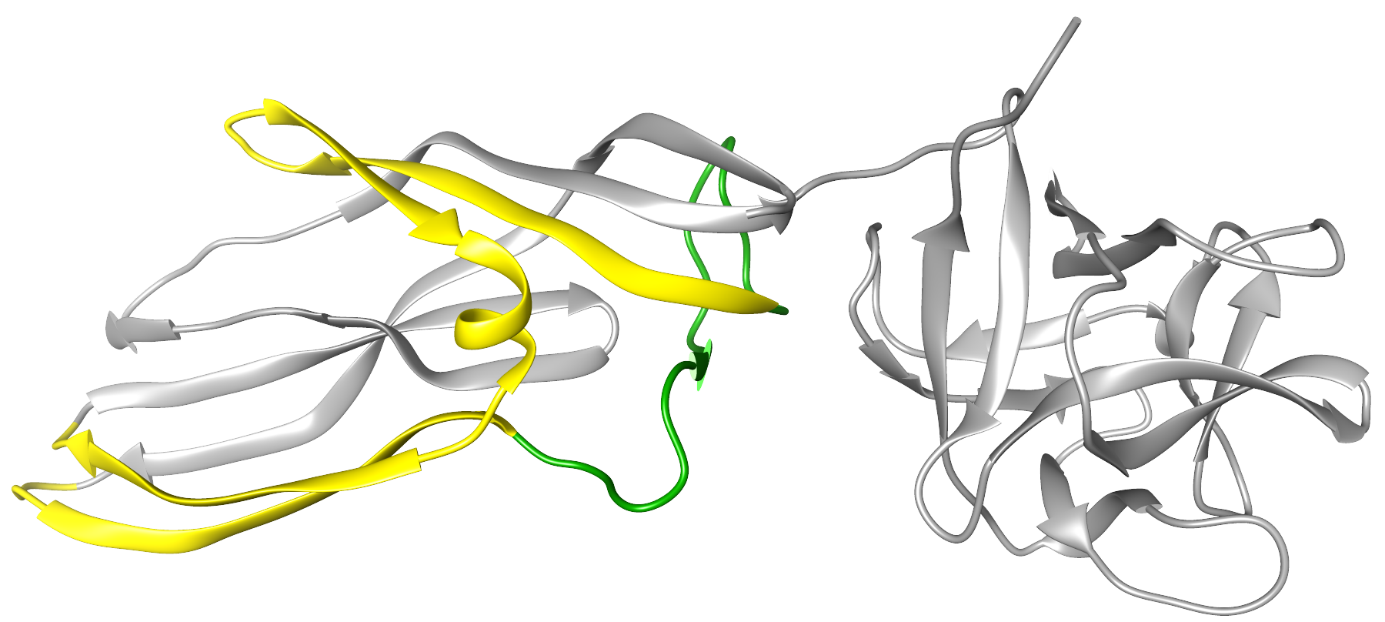
Lysenin water-soluble monomeric X-ray structure (PDB: 3ZXD). Receptor binding domain on right in grey. Pore Forming Module (PFM) on left with region previously thought to be responsible for β-barrel formation in green. Additional region now known to be important in β-barrel formation in yellow (from X-ray data),

Lysenin is a protein produced in the coelomocyte-leucocytes of the earthworm Eisenia fetida. This protein was first isolated from the coelomic fluid in 1996 and named lysenin (from lysis and Eisenia). Lysenin is a relatively small water-soluble molecule with a molecular weight of 33 kDa. Using X-ray crystallography, lysenin was classified as a member of the Aerolysin protein family by structure and function. Structurally, each lysenin monomer consists of a receptor binding domain (grey globular part on right of Figure 1) and a Pore Forming Module (PFM); domains shared throughout the aerolysin family. The lysenin receptor binding domain shows three sphingomyelin binding motifs. The Pore Forming Module contains the regions that undergo large conformational changes to become the β-barrel in the pore.

== Membrane receptors ==
The natural membrane target of lysenin is an animal plasma membrane lipid called sphingomyelin located mainly in its outer leaflet, involving at least three of its phosphatidylcholine (PC) groups. Sphingomyelin is usually found associated with cholesterol in lipid rafts. Cholesterol, which enhances oligomerization, provides a stable platform with high lateral mobility where monomer-monomer encounters are more probable. PFTs have shown to be able to remodel the membrane structure, sometimes even mixing lipid phases.

The region of the lysenin pore β-barrel expected to be immersed in the hydrophobic region of the membrane is the 'detergent belt', the 3.2 nm high region occupied by detergent in Cryogenic Electron Microscopy (Cryo-EM) studies of the pore. On the other hand, sphingomyelin/Cholesterol bilayers are about 4.5 nm height. This difference in height between the detergent belt and the sphingomyelin/cholesterol bilayer implies a bend of the membrane in the region surrounding the pore, called negative mismatch. This bending results in a net attraction between pores that induce pores aggregation.

== Binding, oligomerization and insertion ==
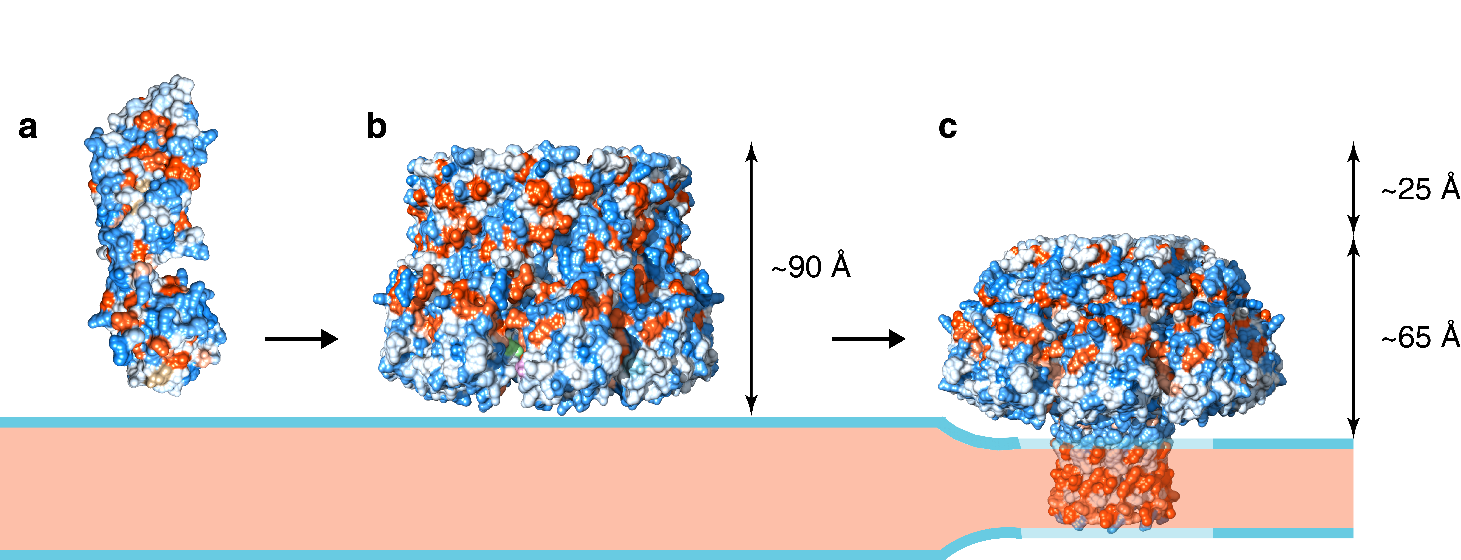
Lysenin mechanism of action Scheme. a) Lysenin monomers are segregated as soluble proteins that bind specifically to sphingomyelin by its receptor binding domain. After binding, and reach a certain density, the oligomerization starts. b) After a complete oligomerization, the prepore is formed. The prepore model shown here was assembled from the monomer structure and aligned with the pore structure (PDB: 5GAQ) by their receptor-binding domains (residues 160 to 297). The height of the prepore was set to agree with the Atomic Force Microscopy measurements. c) Membrane inserted Lysenin assembly (PDB: 5GAQ). The height of the pore was measured from the detergent belt to the last residue, assuming that the detergent belt corresponds with the part of the pore surrounded by the membrane. The membrane was placed in the β-barrel of the pore to match with the detergent belt, that englobe all the hydrophobic residues of the β-barrel. The hydrophobic surface colour scale is according to the hydrophobicity scale of Kyte and Doolittle.

Membrane binding is a requisite to initiate PFT oligomerization. Lysenin monomers bind specifically to sphingomyelin via the receptor binding domain. The final lysenin oligomer is constituted by nine monomers without quantified deviations. When lysenin monomers bind to sphingomyelin-enriched membrane regions, they provide a stable platform with a high lateral mobility, hence favouring the oligomerization. As with most PFTs, lysenin oligomerization occurs in a two-step process, as was recently imaged.

The process begins with monomers being adsorbed into the membrane by specific interactions, resulting in an increased concentration of monomers. This increase is promoted by the small area where the membrane receptor accumulates since the majority of PFT membrane receptors are associated with lipid rafts. Another side effect, aside from the increase of monomer concentration, is the monomer-monomer interaction. This interaction increases lysenin oligomerization. After a critical threshold concentration is reached, several oligomers are formed simultaneously, although sometimes these are incomplete. In contrast to PFTs of the cholesterol-dependent cytolysin family, the transition from incomplete lysenin oligomers to complete oligomers has not been observed.

A complete oligomerization results in the so-called prepore state, a structure on the membrane. Determining the prepore's structure by X-ray or Cryo-EM is a challenging process that so far has not produced any results. The only available information about the prepore structure was provided by Atomic Force Microscopy (AFM). The measured prepore height was 90 Å; and the width 118 Å, with an inner pore of 50 Å. A model of the prepore was built aligning the monomer structure (PDB: 3ZXD) with the pore structure (PDB: 5GAQ) by their receptor-binding domains (residues 160 to 297). A recent study in aerolysin suggests that the currently accepted model for the lysenin prepore should be revisited, according to the new available data on the aerolysin insertion.

A conformational change transforms the PFM into the transmembrane β-barrel, leading to the pore state. The trigger mechanism for the prepore-to-pore transition in lysenin depends on three glutamic acid residues (E92, E94 and E97), and is activated by a decrease in pH, from physiological conditions to the acidic conditions reached after endocytosis, or an increase in calcium extracellular concentration. These three glutamic acids are located in an α-helix that forms part of the PFM, and glutamic acids are found in aerolysin family members in its PFMs. Such a conformational change produces a decrease in the oligomer height of 2.5 nm according to AFM measurements. The main dimensions, using lysenin pore X-ray structure, are height 97 Å, width 115 Å and the inner pore of 30 Å. However, complete oligomerization into the nonamer is not a requisite for the insertion, since incomplete oligomers in the pore state can be found. The prepore to pore transition can be blocked in crowded conditions, a mechanism that could be general to all β-PFTs. The first hint of crowding effect on prepore to pore transition was given by congestion effects in electrophysiology experiments.

== Insertion consequences ==
The ultimate consequences of lysenin pore formation are not well documented; however, it is thought to induce apoptosis via three possible hypotheses:

- Breaking the sphingomyelin asymmetry between the two leaflets of the lipid bilayer by punching holes in the membrane and inducing lipid flip-flop (reorientation of a lipid from one leaflet of a membrane bilayer to the other).
- Increasing the calcium concentration in the cytoplasm.
- Decreasing the potassium concentration in the cytoplasm.

== Biological role ==
The biological role of lysenin remains unknown. It has been suggested that lysenin may play a role as a defence mechanism against attackers such as bacteria, fungi or small invertebrates. However, lysenin's activity is dependent upon binding to sphingomyelin, which is not present in the membranes of bacteria, fungi or most invertebrates. Rather, sphingomyelin is mainly present in the plasma membrane of chordates. Another hypothesis is that the earthworm, which is able to expel coelomic fluid under stress, generates an avoidance behaviour to its vertebrate predators (such as birds, hedgehogs or moles). If that is the case, the expelled lysenin might be more effective if the coelomic fluid reaches the eye, where the concentration of sphingomyelin is ten times higher than in other body organs. A complementary hypothesis is that the pungent smell of the coelomic fluid - giving the earthworm its specific epithet foetida - is an anti-predator adaptation. However, it remains unknown whether lysenin contributes to avoidance of Eisenia by predators.

== Applications ==
Lysenin's conductive properties have been studied for years. Like most pore-forming toxins, lysenin forms a non-specific channel that is permeable to ions, small molecules, and small peptides. There have also been over three decades of studies into finding suitable pores for converting into nanopore sequencing systems that can have their conductive properties tuned by point mutation. Owing to its binding affinity for sphingomyelin, lysenin (or just the receptor binding domain) has been used as a fluorescence marker to detect the sphingomyelin domain in membranes.
