= Alpha toxin =

Alpha toxin or alpha-toxin refers to several different protein toxins produced by bacteria, including:

- Staphylococcus aureus alpha toxin, a membrane-disrupting toxin that creates pores causing hemolysis and tissue damage
- Clostridium perfringens alpha toxin, a membrane-disrupting toxin with phospholipase C activity, which is directly responsible for gas gangrene and myonecrosis
- '
