= Leukocidin =

Pore-forming toxin produced by the bacteria Staphylococcus

Leukocidin D (F subunit)

Identifiers
- Organism: Staphylococcus aureus (strain NCTC 8325)
- Symbol: lukD
- Alt. symbols: SAOUHSC_01954
- Entrez: 3920899
- PDB: 4Q7G
- RefSeq (Prot): YP_500453
- UniProt: Q2FYW0

Other data
- Chromosome: genomic: 1.86 - 1.86 Mb
Search for
- Structures: Swiss-model
- Domains: InterPro

Leukocidin E (S subunit)

Identifiers
- Organism: Staphylococcus aureus (strain NCTC 8325)
- Symbol: lukE
- Alt. symbols: SAOUHSC_01955
- Entrez: 3920899
- PDB: 3ROH
- RefSeq (Prot): YP_500453
- UniProt: Q2FYW1

Other data
- Chromosome: genomic: 1.86 - 1.86 Mb
Search for
- Structures: Swiss-model
- Domains: InterPro

A leukocidin is a type of cytotoxin created by some types of bacteria (Staphylococcus). It is a type of pore-forming toxin. Leukocidins fall into the category of bacterial invasin. Invasins are enzymatic secretions that help bacteria invade the host tissue to which they are attached. Although similar to exotoxins, invasins are different in two respects: they work through much less specific mechanisms than exotoxins, and their actions are generally more localized.

Leukocidins get their names by killing ("-cide") leukocytes. Leukocidins target phagocytes, natural killer cells, dendritic cells, and T lymphocytes, and therefore affect both innate and adaptive immune responses.

== Mechanism of action ==
Leukocidins are pore-forming toxins, and their model for pore formation is step-wise. First, the cytotoxin's "S" subunit recognizes specific protein-containing receptors, typically G-protein coupled receptors, or an integrin on the host cell's surface. The S subunit then recruits a second, "F" subunit. The two subunits dimerize on the host cell surface. This dimerization is followed by oligomerization involving three additional leukocidin dimers, resulting in an octameric prepore complex.

The prepore undergoes a structural transition in which its prestem domain extends into the lipid bilayer, forming a beta barrel that pierces the target cell membrane, thereby disrupting the structure of the cell and leading to lysis.

== Subunits: S and F ==
The F subunit stands for the "fast" subunit while the S subunit stands for the "slow" subunit. The S subunit is the first to bind the lipid bilayer, recognizing the cell surface receptor. Once bound, the F subunit dimerizes with the S subunit to initiate pore assembly.

== Variatiants ==
There are exceptions to the typical binding pattern of leukocidins. For example:

- LukPQ: In this case, the F subunit (rather than the S subunit) recognizes the cell surface receptor.
- LukAB: This leukocidin binds to the integrin CD11b, not a G-protein coupled receptor.

== Examples ==
One notable type of leukocidin is the Panton-Valentine leukocidin.
