= Haemolysin E =

Haemolysin E (HlyE)
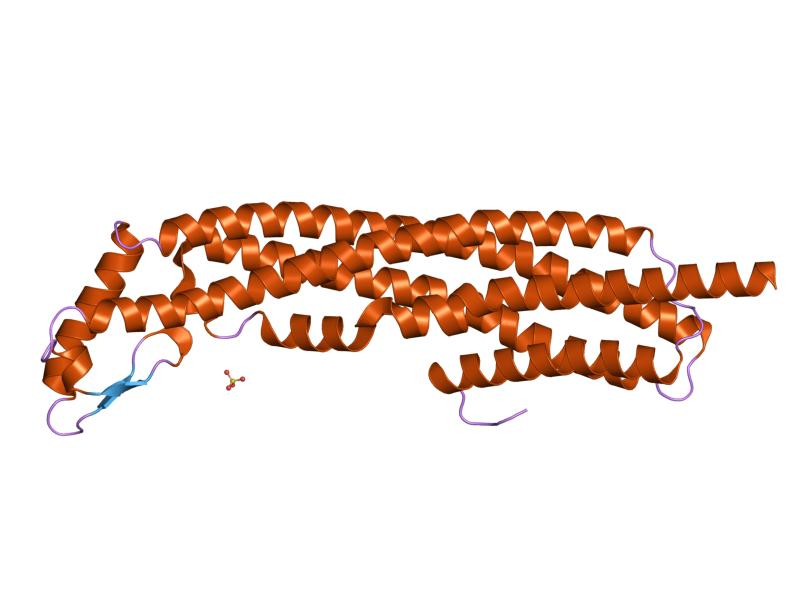
- Structure of E. coli hemolysin E toxin.

Identifiers
- Symbol: HlyE
- Pfam: PF06109
- InterPro: IPR010356
- SCOP2: 1qoy / SCOPe / SUPFAM
- TCDB: 1.C.10
- OPM superfamily: 198
- OPM protein: 2wcd
Available protein structures:
- PDB: IPR010356 PF06109 (ECOD; PDBsum)
- AlphaFold: IPR010356; PF06109

Haemolysin E (HlyE) is a protein family that consists of several enterobacterial haemolysin (HlyE) proteins. Hemolysin E (HlyE) is a novel pore-forming toxin of Escherichia coli, Salmonella typhi, and Shigella flexneri.

HlyE is unrelated to the well characterised pore-forming E. coli hemolysins of the RTX family, haemolysin A.

HlyE is a protein of 34 kDa that is expressed during anaerobic growth of E. coli. Anaerobic expression is controlled by the transcription factor, FNR, such that, upon ingestion and entry into the anaerobic mammalian intestine, HlyE is produced and may then contribute to the colonisation of the host.
