= Ion-beam sculpting =

Ion-Beam sculpting is a two-step process to make solid-state nanopores. The term itself was coined by Golovchenko and co-workers at Harvard in the paper "Ion-beam sculpting at nanometer length scales." In the process, solid-state nanopores are formed by lateral mass transport about the surface of the substrate, not simply by sputtering, which is the removal of material from the surface.

== Basis ==
The first step in ion sculpting is to make either a through hole or a blind hole (not penetrating completely), most commonly using a focused ion beam (FIB). The holes are commonly about 100 nm in diameter, but can be made much smaller. This step may or may not be done at room temperature, with a low temperature of -120 C. Next, three common techniques can be used to 'sculpt' the hole: broad area ion exposure, TEM exposure, and FIB exposure. Holes can be closed completely, or left open at a lower limit of 1 - 10 nm.

== Broad area ion exposure ==
This technique uses a broad area argon ion source beam. If the hole is blind (a blind hole is a hole that has not broken through on the backside yet) the wafer (often SiN or silicon/silicon oxide) is then turned upside down, and exposed with the argon beam. A detector counts the amount of ions passing through the membrane (which should be zero). The process stops when ions begin to be detected. This enables a much smaller hole to be opened than if using an FIB alone. This method of nanopore fabrication relies on the ion beam to remove (sputter) some of the material from the back of the sample, revealing part of the hole underneath.

Alternatively, if the hole has already been milled through the substrate, the argon beam is aimed at the wafer, and by lateral mass transport atoms from elsewhere on the wafer move to the edge of the hole. It is this process of solid-state nanopore fabrication that was originally termed "ion-beam sculpting". Of paramount importance in this method is the ability to utilize a feedback-controlled system to monitor nanopore fabrication in real time. A detector registers the number of ions passing through the hole as a function of time. As the hole closes from about 100 nm to its final dimension (>20 nm) the number of ions able to pass through the hole is reduced. The process is stopped when the final pore size is reached. If the current drops to zero, the hole is closed. This process of nanopore fabrication is used by the laboratories of J. Li and J. Golovchenko. As of 2006 this method was shown to be applicable with all the noble gases, not just argon.

== TEM exposure ==
A through hole in a wafer can be closed down by a transmission electron microscope. Due to hydrocarbon buildup, the electrons stimulate hole closure. This method is very slow, taking over an hour to close a 100 nm hole; this has the advantage that the hole can be watched as it reduces, allowing good control of the hole size, but takes a long time. Citation: T.Schenkel, V.Radmilovic, E.A.Stach, S.-J.Park, A.Persaud, J.Va.Sci.Tech.B 21, 2720 (2003).

== FIB exposure ==
This is the easiest of the techniques, but the least useful. After a hole is milled with an FIB, the hole can be imaged as with the TEM technique. The ions stimulate movement on the wafer, and also implant themselves to help close the hole. Unlike for the other two methods, the holes closed in this technique are not smooth or accurately circular; they appear jagged under TEM photos. Also, it is much harder to control the size of the hole to the single nanometer regime. Another drawback is that while imaging the hole the ion beam is continually sputtering membrane material away. If the beam scan area is large enough, the rate of atoms moving to close the hole will be greater than the rate of sputtering, so the hole will close. If the membrane is too thin or the scan area too small, then the rate of sputtering will win, and the hole will open up. An alternative ion beam sculpting technique has been developed using a commercially available FIB system. This sculpting method can fabricate symmetrically circular nanopores with smooth edge, and can also sculpt multiple nanopores of similar shape and size simultaneously. Dependent on the resolution and working condition of the instrument, this method can produce symmetrically shaped nanopores with diameters below 10 nm.

== See also ==
- Reactive ion etching
