= Lecithinase C =

Enzyme

Phospholipase C

Identifiers
- EC no.: 3.1.4.3
- CAS no.: 9001-86-9

Databases
- IntEnz: IntEnz view
- BRENDA: BRENDA entry
- ExPASy: NiceZyme view
- KEGG: KEGG entry
- MetaCyc: metabolic pathway
- PRIAM: profile
- PDB structures: RCSB PDB PDBe PDBsum
Search
- PMC: articles
- PubMed: articles
- NCBI: proteins

Phospholipase C (EC 3.1.4.3, lipophosphodiesterase I, Clostridium welchii α-toxin, Clostridium oedematiens β- and γ-toxins, lipophosphodiesterase C, phosphatidase C, heat-labile hemolysin, α-toxin) is an enzyme with systematic name phosphatidylcholine cholinephosphohydrolase. This enzyme catalyses the following chemical reaction

a phosphatidylcholine + H_{2}O $\rightleftharpoons$ 1,2-diacyl-sn-glycerol + phosphocholine

The bacterial enzyme is a zinc protein. It also acts on sphingomyelin and phosphatidylinositol.
