= Panton–Valentine leukocidin =

Cytotoxin forming pores in cell membranes

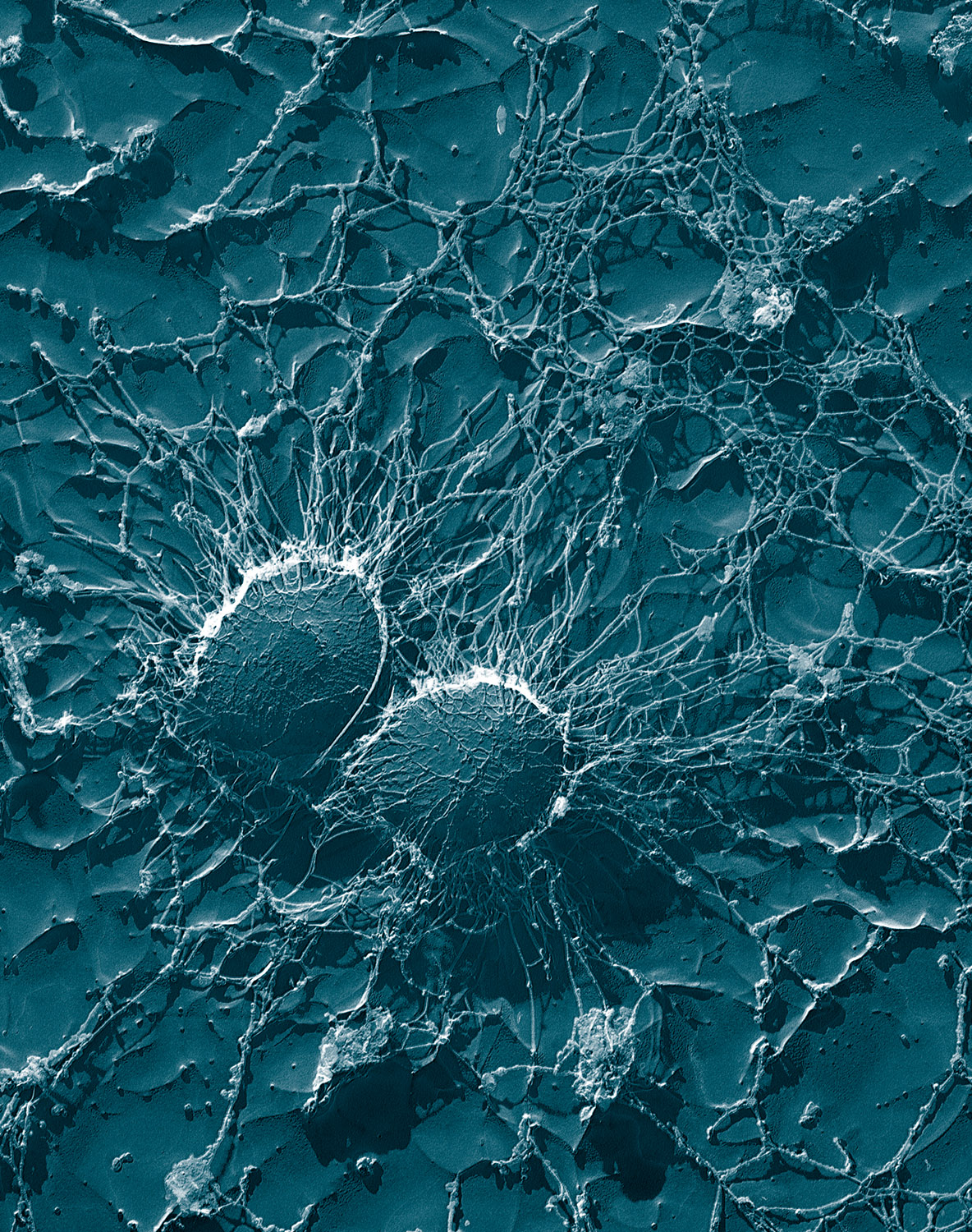
PVL is expressed in Staphylococcus aureus (shown x 50,000)

Panton–Valentine leukocidin (PVL) is a cytotoxin—one of the β-pore-forming toxins. PVL is a bicomponent pore-forming toxin composed of LukS-PV and LukF-PV subunits. These assemble into octameric β-barrel pores on the membranes of neutrophils, monocytes, and macrophages, leading to cell lysis and inflammation. The pore formation is calcium-dependent and highly species-specific (effective in humans and rabbits, not mice). The presence of PVL is associated with increased virulence of certain strains (isolates) of Staphylococcus aureus. It is present in the majority of community-associated methicillin-resistant Staphylococcus aureus (CA-MRSA) isolates studied and is the cause of necrotic lesions involving the skin or mucosa, including necrotic hemorrhagic pneumonia. PVL creates pores in the membranes of infected cells. PVL is produced from the genetic material of a bacteriophage that infects Staphylococcus aureus, making it more virulent.

== History ==
It was initially discovered by Van deVelde in 1894 due to its ability to lyse leukocytes. It was named after Sir Philip Noel Panton and Francis Valentine when they associated it with soft tissue infections in 1932.

== Mechanism of action ==
PVL, S component
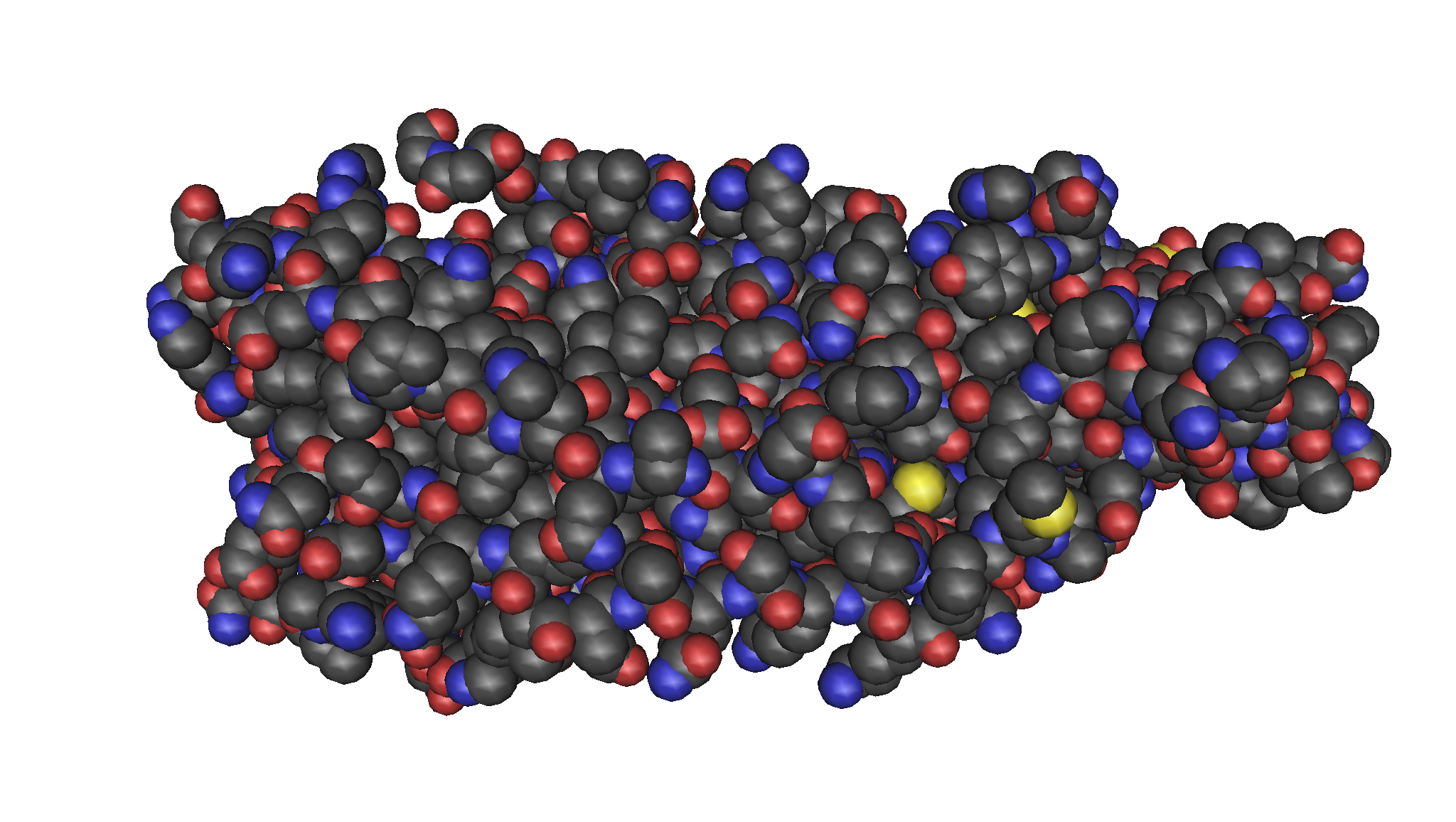

Identifiers
- Organism: Staphylococcus virus phiSLT
- Symbol: LukS-PV
- PDB: 1PVL
- UniProt: Q783R1
Search for
- Structures: Swiss-model
- Domains: InterPro

PVL, F component
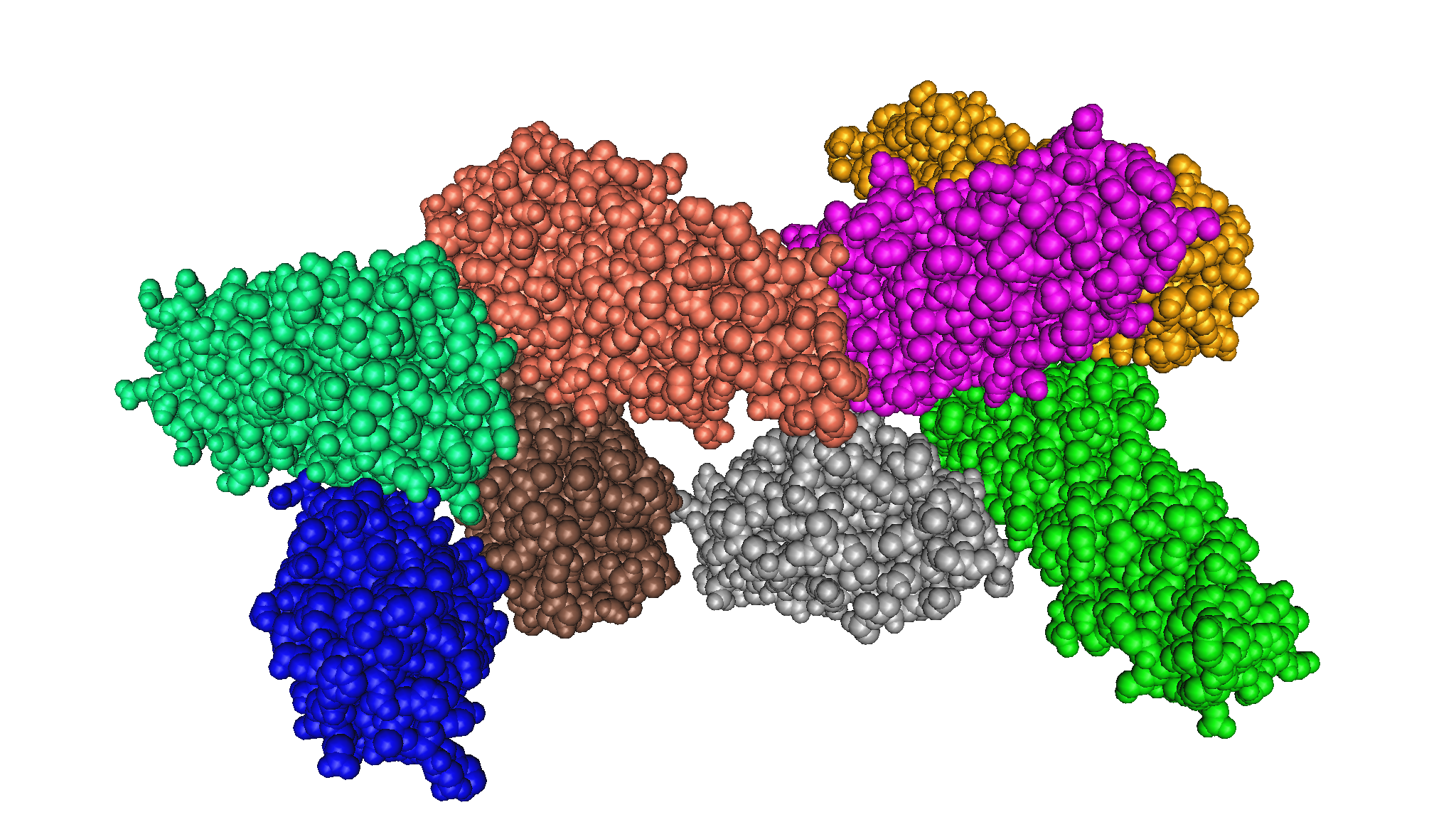

Identifiers
- Organism: Staphylococcus virus phiSLT
- Symbol: LukF-PV
- PDB: 1T5R
- UniProt: Q5FBD2
Search for
- Structures: Swiss-model
- Domains: InterPro

Exotoxins such as PVL constitute essential components of the virulence mechanisms of S. aureus. Nearly all strains secrete lethal factors that convert host tissues into nutrients required for bacterial growth.

PVL is a member of the synergohymenotropic toxin family that induces pores in the membranes of cells. The PVL factor is encoded in a prophage—designated as Φ-PVL—which is a virus integrated into the S. aureus bacterial chromosome. Its genes secrete two proteins—toxins designated LukS-PV and LukF-PV, 33 and 34 kDa in size. The structures of both proteins have been solved in the soluble forms, and are present in the PDB as ID codes 1t5r and 1pvl respectively.

LukS-PV and LukF-PV act together as subunits, assembling in the membrane of host defense cells, in particular, white blood cells, monocytes, and macrophages. The subunits fit together and form a ring with a central pore through which cell contents leak and which acts as a superantigen. Other authors contribute the differential response of MRSA subtypes to phenol-soluble modulin (PSM) peptides and not to PVL.

== Clinical effects ==
PVL causes leukocyte destruction and necrotizing pneumonia, an aggressive condition that can kill up to 75% of patients. Comparing cases of staphylococcal necrotizing pneumonia, 85% of community-acquired (CAP) cases were PVL-positive, while none of the hospital-acquired cases were. CAP afflicted younger and healthier patients and yet had a worse outcome (>40% mortality.) It has played a role in a number of outbreaks of fatal bacterial infections. PVL may increase the expression of staphylococcal protein A, a key pro-inflammatory factor for pneumonia.

The leukotoxin can also be responsible for boils, abscesses, pyomyositis, and osteomyelitis.

== Epidemiology ==
PVL is one of many toxins associated with S. aureus infection. Because it can be found in virtually all CA-MRSA strains that cause soft-tissue infections, it was long described as a key virulence factor, allowing the bacteria to target and kill specific white blood cells known as neutrophils. This view was challenged, however, when it was shown that removal of PVL from the two major epidemic CA-MRSA strains resulted in no loss of infectivity or destruction of neutrophils in a mouse model. However, it has been shown that PVL does not act in mice like it does in humans.

Genetic analysis shows that PVL CA-MRSA has emerged several times, on different continents, rather than being the worldwide spread of a single clone.
