= Aerolysin =

Pore forming toxin

- Aerolysin

Identifiers
- Symbol: Aerolysin
- Pfam: PF01117
- Pfam clan: CL0345
- InterPro: IPR005830
- PROSITE: PDOC00247
- SCOP2: 9fm6 1pre, 9fm6 / 9fm6 SCOPe / 9fm6 SUPFAM
- TCDB: 1.C.4
- OPM superfamily: 35
- OPM protein: 9fm6 5jzt, 9fm6
Available protein structures:
- PDB: IPR005830 PF01117 (ECOD; PDBsum)
- AlphaFold: IPR005830; PF01117

In molecular biology, Aerolysin is a cytolytic pore-forming toxin exported by Aeromonas hydrophila, a Gram-negative bacterium associated with diarrhoeal diseases and deep wound infections. It is also produced by the caterpillar of the moth Megalopyge opercularis, sometimes called the Tree Asp. The mature toxin binds to eukaryotic cells and aggregates to form holes (approximately 3 nm in diameter) leading to the destruction of the membrane permeability barrier and osmotic lysis. The structure of proaerolysin has been determined to 2.8A resolution and shows the protoxin to adopt a novel fold. High-resolution cryo-EM atomic models of aerolysin in membrane-like environment (lipid copolymer Nanodiscs) as well as some prepore-like mutant have been elucidated, permitting the identification of important interactions required for pore formation and revealing four constriction rings in the pore lumen.

== Aerolysin as a biosensor ==
Aerolysin has also been used as a biosensor due to its narrow lumen and four constrictions points, which could be easily mutated, rendering aerolysin very sensitive for the detection of small molecules, (cyclic) peptides, polymers,^{,} biopolymers such as DNA or RNA, different sugars and also some proteins.

Aerolysin has also been used as a tool to assess the action mechanism of the Hsp70 protein and to study the association mechanism to the membrane as well as pore formation with angle-resolved second harmonic scattering (AR-SHS), enabling to quantify quantitatively the affinity of aerolysin to lipids using liposomes.
