= Staphylococcus aureus alpha toxin =

Membrane-disrupting cytotoxin agent

Alpha-hemolysin
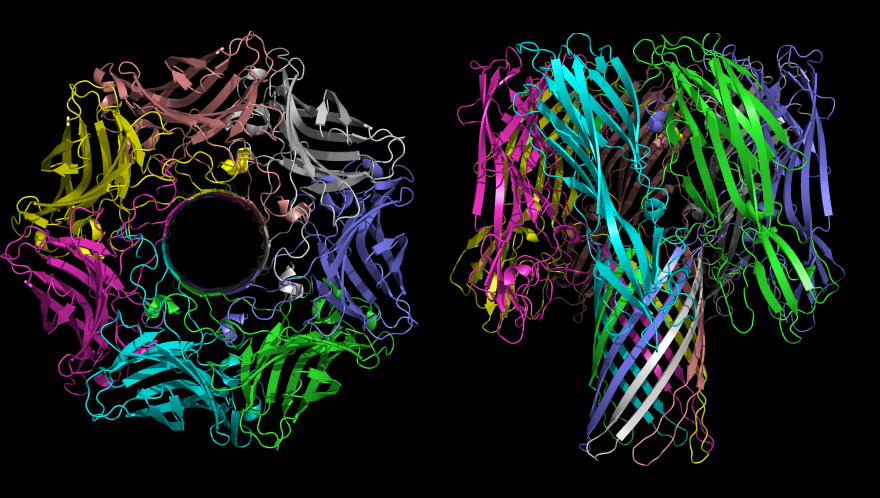
- Alpha toxin from S. aureus (PDB: 7AHL)

Identifiers
- Organism: Staphylococcus aureus
- Symbol: hly
- Alt. symbols: hla, Alpha-toxin
- Orthologs: OMA: entry
- PDB: 7AHL
- UniProt: P09616
Search for
- Structures: Swiss-model
- Domains: InterPro

Alpha-toxin, also known as alpha-hemolysin (Hla), is the major cytotoxic agent released by bacterium Staphylococcus aureus and the first identified member of the pore forming beta-barrel toxin family. This toxin consists mostly of beta sheets (68%) with only about 10% alpha helices. The hly gene on the S. aureus chromosome encodes the 293 residue protein monomer, which forms heptameric units on the cellular membrane to form a complete beta barrel pore. This structure allows the toxin to perform its major function, development of pores in the cellular membrane, eventually causing cell death.

== Function ==
Alpha-toxin has been shown to play a role in pathogenesis of disease, as hly knockout strains show reductions in invasiveness and virulence. The dosage of toxin can result in two different modes of activity. Low concentrations of toxin bind to specific, but unidentified, cell surface receptors and form the heptameric pores. This pore allows the exchange of monovalent ions, resulting in DNA fragmentation and eventually apoptosis. Higher concentrations result in the toxin absorbing nonspecifically to the lipid bilayer and forming large, Ca^{2+} permissive pores. This in turn results in massive necrosis and other secondary cellular reactions triggered by the uncontrolled Ca^{2+} influx.

== Structure ==
The structure of the protein has been solved by X-ray crystallography and is deposited in the PDB as id code 7ahl. Seven monomers each contribute a long beta-hairpin to a fourteen stranded beta barrel that forms a pore in the cell membrane. This pore is 14 ångström wide at its narrowest point. This width equals the diameter of approximately 4 calcium ions.

== Role in apoptosis ==
Recently, studies have shown that alpha-toxin plays a role in inducing apoptosis in certain human immune cells. Incubation of T-cells, monocytes, and peripheral blood lymphocytes with either purified alpha-toxin or S. aureus cell lysate resulted in the induction of apoptosis via the intrinsic death pathway. This activity was inhibited when two different anti-alpha-toxin antibodies were introduced. In the same study, alpha toxin was shown to activate caspase 8 and caspase 9, which in turn activate caspase 3, which causes massive DNA degradation and apoptosis. This activity was shown to be independent of the death receptor pathway.

== Vaccine development ==
Alpha-toxin is also one of the key virulence factors in S. aureus pneumonia. The level of alpha-toxin expressed by a particular strain of S. aureus directly correlates with the virulence of the strain. Recent research has shown that immunization with a mutant form of alpha-toxin that is no longer able to form pores protects against S. aureus pneumonia in mice. Also, introduction of alpha-toxin specific antibodies into an unimmunized animal protects against subsequent infection. Cultures of human lung epithelial cells incubated with anti-alpha-toxin and infected with S. aureus showed marked reductions in cellular damage when compared to control cells. As many strains of S. aureus are proving to be resistant to most available antibiotics, specific targeting of virulence factors with antibodies may be the next step to treating this pathogen.

== Nanopore technology ==
Alpha-hemolysin has been used extensively in academic research as a single molecule nanopore sensor. In 1996 it was first shown that single-stranded nucleic acids can be detected by electrophysiology measurements as they translocate through an alpha-hemolysin pore embedded in a lipid bilayer. This was an important milestone in the development of nanopore sequencing.
