= Pore-forming toxin =

Protein-produced toxins that create pores in cell membrane

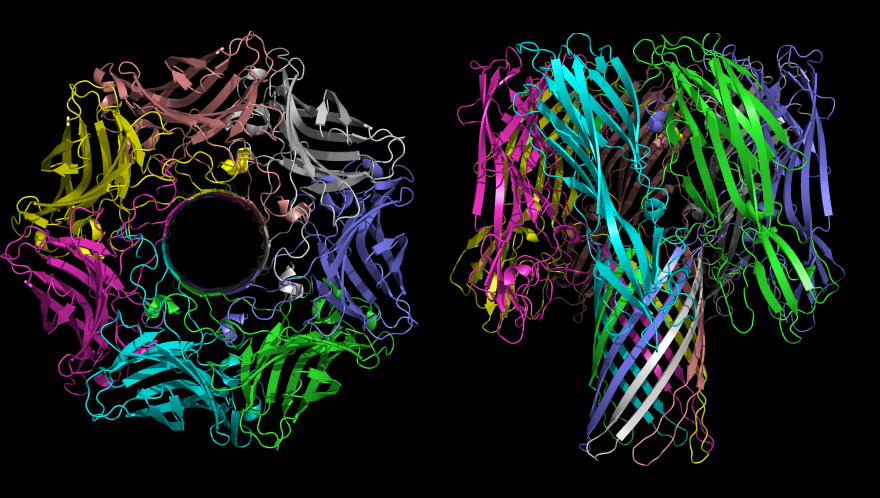
α-Hemolysin from S.aureus (PDB: 7AHL)

Pore-forming proteins (PFTs, also known as pore-forming toxins) are usually produced by bacteria, and include a number of protein exotoxins but may also be produced by other organisms such as apple snails that produce perivitellin-2 or earthworms, who produce lysenin. They are frequently cytotoxic (i.e., they kill cells), as they create unregulated pores in the membrane of targeted cells.

== Types ==
PFTs can be divided into two categories, depending on the alpha-helical or beta-barrel architecture of their transmembrane channel that can consist either of

- Alpha-pore-forming toxins
  - e.g., Haemolysin E family, actinoporins, Corynebacterial porin B, Cytolysin A of E. coli.
- Beta-barrel pore-forming toxins
  - e.g. α-Hemolysin (Fig 1), PVL – Panton-Valentine leukocidin, various insecticidal toxins.

Other categories:

- Large beta-barrel pore-forming toxins
  - MACPF and Cholesterol-dependent cytolysins (CDCs), gasdermin
- Binary toxins
  - e.g., Anthrax toxin, Pleurotolysin
- Small pore-forming toxins
  - e.g., Gramicidin A

According to TCDB, there are following families of pore-forming toxins:

- 1.C.3 α-Hemolysin (αHL) family:
- 1.C.4 Aerolysin family
- 1.C.5 ε-Toxin family
- 1.C.11 RTX-toxin superfamily
- 1.C.12 Membrane attack complex/perforin superfamily
- 1.C.13 Leukocidin family
- 1.C.14 Cytohemolysin (CHL) family
- 1.C.39 Thiol-activated cholesterol-dependent cytolysin family
- 1.C.43 Lysenin family
- 1.C.56 Pseudomonas syringae HrpZ cation channel family
- 1.C.57 Clostridial cytotoxin family
- 1.C.74 Snake cytotoxin (SCT) family
- 1.C.97 Pleurotolysin pore-forming family

=== Beta-pore-forming toxins ===
Leukocidin

Identifiers
- Symbol: Leukocidin
- Pfam: PF07968
- InterPro: IPR001340
- TCDB: 1.C.3
- OPM superfamily: 35
- OPM protein: 7ahl
Available protein structures:
- PDB: IPR001340 PF07968 (ECOD; PDBsum)
- AlphaFold: IPR001340; PF07968

β-PFTs are so-named because of their structural characteristics: they are composed mostly of β-strand-based domains. They have divergent sequences, and are classified by Pfam into a number of families including Leukocidins, Etx-Mtx2, Toxin-10, and aegerolysin. X-ray crystallographic structures have revealed some commonalities: α-hemolysin and Panton-Valentine leukocidin S are structurally related. Similarly, aerolysin and clostridial epsilon-toxin. and Mtx2 are linked in the Etx/Mtx2 family.

The ß-PFTs include a number of toxins of commercial interest for the control of pest insects. These toxins are potent but also highly specific to a limited range of target insects, making them safe biological control agents.

Insecticidal members of the Etx/Mtx2 family include Mtx2 and Mtx3 from Lysinibacillus sphaericus that can control mosquito vectors of human diseases and also Cry15, Cry23, Cry33, Cry38, Cry45, Cry51, Cry60, Cry64 and Cry74 from Bacillus thuringiensis that control a range of insect pests that can cause great losses to agriculture.

Insecticidal toxins in the Toxin_10 family show an overall similarity to the aerolysin and Etx/Mtx2 toxin structures but differ in two notable features. While all of these toxins feature a head domain and a larger, extended beta-sheet tail domain, in the Toxin_10 family, the head is formed exclusively from the N-terminal region of the primary amino acid sequence whereas regions from throughout the protein sequence contribute to the head domain in Etx/Mtx2 toxins. In addition, the head domains of the Toxin_10 proteins show lectin-like features of carbohydrate binding domains. The only reported natural targets of Toxin_10 proteins are insects. With the exception of Cry36 and Cry78, the Toxin_10 toxins appear to act as two-part, binary toxins. The partner proteins in these combinations may belong to different structural groups, depending on the individual toxin: two Toxin_10 proteins (BinA and BinB) act together in the Bin mosquitocidal toxin of Lysinibacillus sphaericus; the Toxin_10 Cry49 is co-dependent on the 3-domain toxin family member Cry48 for its activity against Culex mosquito larvae; and the Bacillus thuringiensis Toxin_10 protein Cry35 interacts with the aegerolysin family Cry34 to kill Western Corn Rootworm. This toxin pair has been included in insect resistant plants such as SmartStax corn.

==== Mode of action ====
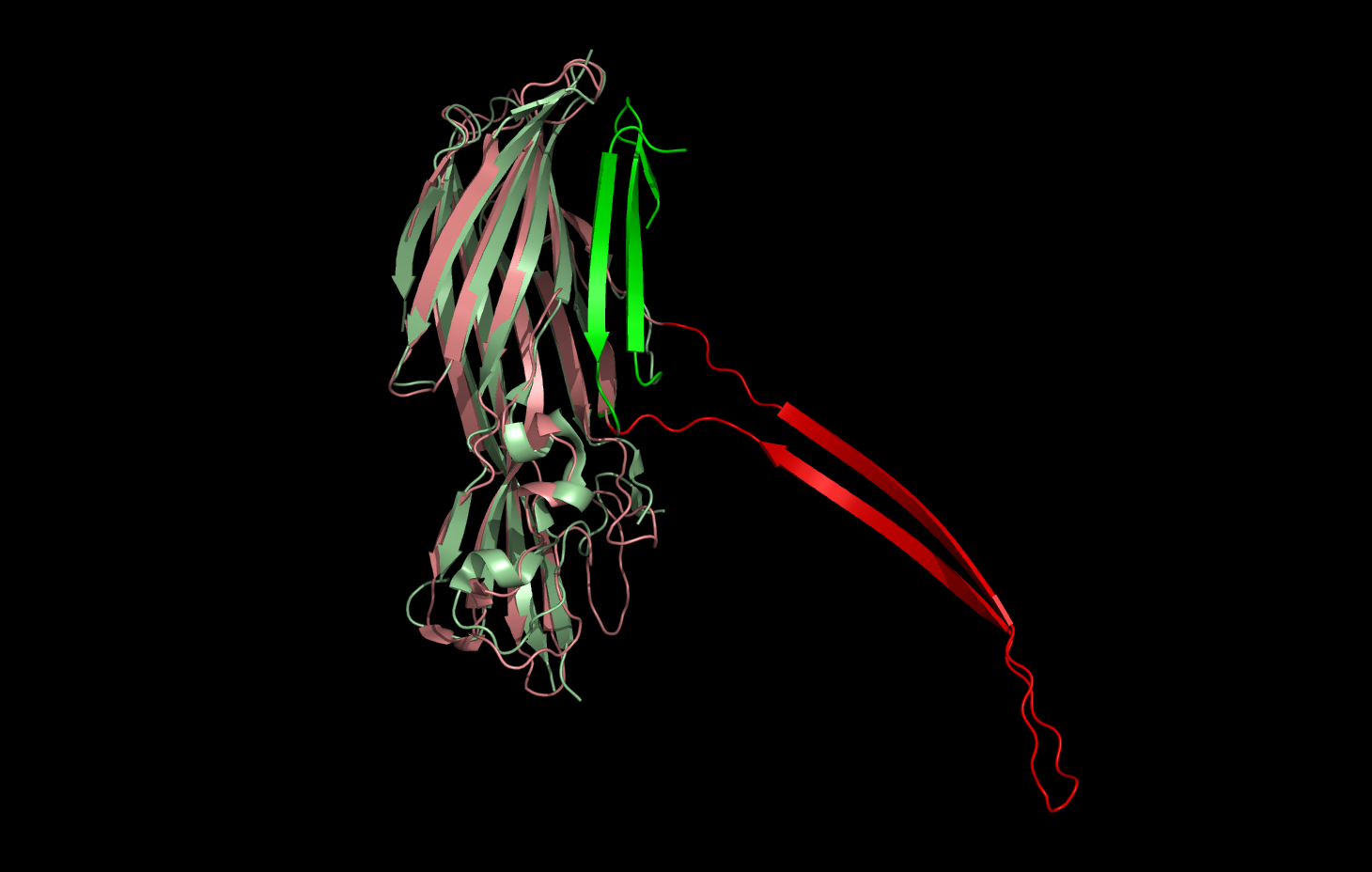
Structural comparison of pore-form α-hemolysin (pink/red) and soluble-form PVL (pale green/green). It is postulated that the green section in PVL 'flips out' to the 'red' conformation as seen in α-haemolysin. (PDB: 7AHL, 1T5R)

β-PFTs are dimorphic proteins that exist as soluble monomers and then assemble to form multimeric assemblies that constitute the pore. Figure 1 shows the pore-form of α-hemolysin, the first crystal structure of a β-PFT in its pore-form. 7 α-hemolysin monomers come together to create the mushroom-shaped pore. The 'cap' of the mushroom sits on the surface of the cell, and the 'stalk' of the mushroom penetrates the cell membrane, rendering it permeable (see later). The 'stalk' is composed of a 14-strand β-barrel, with two strands donated from each monomer. A structure of the Vibrio cholerae cytolysin PDB: 3O44 in the pore form is also heptameric; however, Staphylococcus aureus gamma-hemolysin PDB: 3B07 reveals an octomeric pore, consequently with a 16-strand 'stalk'. The Panton-Valentine leucocidin S structure PDB: 1T5R shows a highly related structure, but in its soluble monomeric state. This shows that the strands involved in forming the 'stalk' are in a very different conformation – shown in Fig 2. While the Bin toxin of Lysinibacillus sphaericus is able to form pores in artificial membranes and mosquito cells in culture, it also causes a series of other cellular changes including the uptake of toxin in recycling endosomes and the production of large, autophagic vesicles and the ultimate cause of cell death may be apoptotic. Similar effects on cell biology are also seen with other Toxin_10 activities but the roles of these events in toxicity remain to be established.

===== Assembly =====
The transition between soluble monomer and membrane-associated protomer to oligomer is not a trivial one: It is believed that β-PFTs, follow as similar assembly pathway as the CDCs (see § Cholesterol-dependent cytolysins later), in that they must first assemble on the cell-surface (in a receptor-mediated fashion in some cases) in a pre-pore state. Following this, the large-scale conformational change occurs in which the membrane spanning section is formed and inserted into the membrane. The portion entering the membrane, referred to as the head, is usually apolar and hydrophobic, this produces an energetically favorable insertion of the pore-forming toxin.

==== Specificity ====
Some β-PFTs such as clostridial ε-toxin and Clostridium perfringens enterotoxin (CPE) bind to the cell membrane via specific receptors – possibly certain claudins for CPE, possibly GPI anchors or other sugars for ε-toxin – these receptors help raise the local concentration of the toxins, allowing oligomerisation and pore formation.

The BinB Toxin_10 component of the Lysinibacillus sphaericus Bin toxin specifically recognises a GPI anchored alpha glycosidase in the midgut of Culex and Anopheles mosquitoes but not the related protein found in Aedes mosquitoes, hence conferring specificity on the toxin.

==== The cyto-lethal effects of the pore ====
When the pore is formed, the tight regulation of what can and cannot enter/leave a cell is disrupted. Ions and small molecules, such as amino acids and nucleotides within the cell, flow out, and water from the surrounding tissue enters. The loss of important small molecules to the cell can disrupt protein synthesis and other crucial cellular reactions. The loss of ions, especially calcium, can cause cell signaling pathways to be spuriously activated or deactivated. The uncontrolled entry of water into a cell can cause the cell to swell up uncontrollably: this causes a process called blebbing, wherein large parts of the cell membrane are distorted and give way under the mounting internal pressure. In the end, this can cause the cell to burst. In particular, nuclear - free erythrocytes under the influence of alpha-staphylotoxin undergo hemolysis with the loss of a large protein hemoglobin.

=== Binary toxins ===
There are many different types of binary toxins. The term binary toxin simply implies a two part toxin where both components are necessary for toxic activity. Several β-PFTs form binary toxins.

As discussed above, the majority of the Toxin_10 family proteins act as part of binary toxins with partner proteins that may belong to the Toxin_10 or other structural families. The interplay of the individual components has not been well studied to date. Other beta sheet toxins of commercial importance are also binary. These include the Cry23/Cry37 toxin from Bacillus thuringiensis. These toxins have some structural similarity to the Cry34/Cry35 binary toxin but neither component shows a match to established Pfam families and the features of the larger Cry23 protein have more in common with the Etx/Mtx2 family than the Toxin_10 family to which Cry35 belongs.

==== Enzymatic binary toxins ====
Some binary toxins are composed of an enzymatic component and a component that is involved in membrane interactions and entry of the enzymatic component into the cell. The membrane interacting component may have structural domains that are rich in beta sheets. Binary toxins, such as anthrax lethal and edema toxins (Main article: Anthrax toxin), C. perfringens iota toxin and C. difficile cyto-lethal toxins consist of two components (hence binary):

- an enzymatic component – A
- a membrane-altering component – B

In these enzymatic binary toxins, the B component facilitates the entry of the enzymatic 'payload' (A subunit) into the target cell, by forming homooligomeric pores, as shown above for βPFTs. The A component then enters the cytosol and inhibits normal cell functions by one of the following means:

==== ADP-ribosylation ====
ADP-ribosylation is a common enzymatic method used by different bacterial toxins from various species. Toxins such as C. perfringens iota toxin and C. botulinum C2 toxin, attach a ribosyl-ADP moiety to surface arginine residue 177 of G-actin. This prevents G-actin assembling to form F-actin, and, thus, the cytoskeleton breaks down, resulting in cell death. Insecticidal members of the ADP-ribosyltransferase family of toxins include the Mtx1 toxin of Lysinibacillus sphaericus and the Vip1/Vip2 toxin of Bacillus thuringiensis and some members of the toxin complex (Tc) toxins from gram negative bacteria such as Photorhabdus and Xenorhabdus species. The beta sheet-rich regions of the Mtx1 protein are lectin-like sequences that may be involved in glycolipid interactions.

==== Proteolysis of mitogen-activated protein kinase kinases (MAPKK) ====
The A component of anthrax toxin lethal toxin is zinc-metalloprotease, which shows specificity for a conserved family of mitogen-activated protein kinases. The loss of these proteins results in a breakdown of cell signaling, which, in turn, renders the cell insensitive to outside stimuli – therefore no immune response is triggered.

==== Increasing intracellular levels of cAMP ====
Anthrax toxin edema toxin triggers a calcium ion influx into the target cell. This subsequently elevates intracellular cAMP levels. This can profoundly alter any sort of immune response, by inhibiting leucocyte proliferation, phagocytosis, and proinflammatory cytokine release.

=== Cholesterol-dependent cytolysins ===
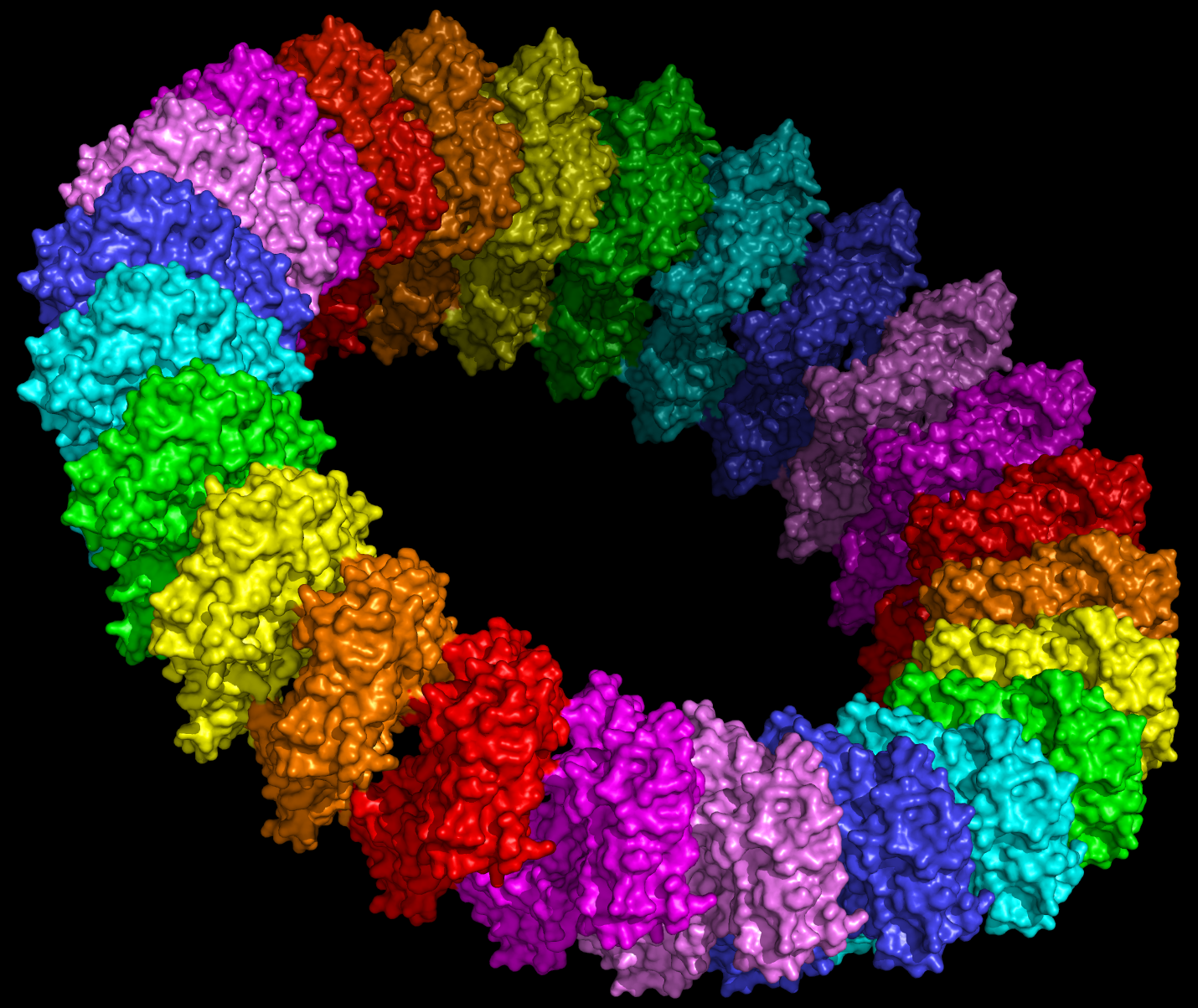
EM reconstruction of a pneumolysin pre-pore

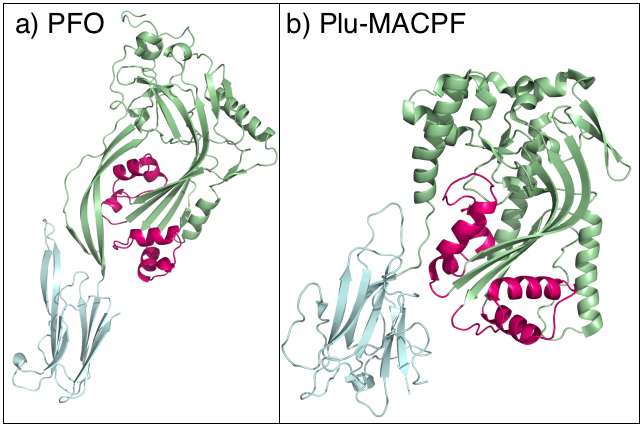
a) The structure of perfringolysin O and b) the structure of PluMACPF. In both proteins, the two small clusters of α-helices that unwind and pierce the membrane are in pink. (PDB: 1PFO, 2QP2)

CDCs, such as pneumolysin, from S. pneumoniae, form pores as large as 260 Å (26 nm), containing between 30 and 44 monomer units. Electron microscopy studies of pneumolysin show that it assembles into large multimeric peripheral membrane complexes before undergoing a conformational change in which a group of α-helices in each monomer change into extended, amphipathic β-hairpins that span the membrane, in a manner reminiscent of α-haemolysin, albeit on a much larger scale (Fig 3). CDCs are homologous to the MACPF family of pore-forming toxins, and it is suggested that both families use a common mechanism (Fig 4). Eukaryote MACPF proteins function in immune defence and are found in proteins such as perforin and complement C9 though perivitellin-2 is a MACPF attached to a delivery lectin that has enterotoxic and neurotoxic properties toward mice.

A family of highly conserved cholesterol-dependent cytolysins, closely related to perfringolysin from Clostridium perfringens are produced by bacteria from across the order Bacillales and include anthrolysin, alveolysin and sphaericolysin. Sphaericolysin has been shown to exhibit toxicity to a limited range of insects injected with the purified protein.

== Biological function ==
Bacteria may invest much time and energy in making these toxins: CPE can account for up to 15% of the dry mass of C. perfringens at the time of sporulation. The purpose of toxins is thought to be one of the following:

- Defense against phagocytosis, e.g., by a macrophage.
- Inside a host, provoking a response which is beneficial for the proliferation of the bacteria, for example in cholera. or in the case of insecticidal bacteria, killing the insect to provide a rich source of nutrients in the cadaver for bacterial growth.
- Food: After the target cell has ruptured and released its contents, the bacteria can scavenge the remains for nutrients or, as above, bacteria can colonise insect cadavers.
- Environment: The mammalian immune response helps create the anaerobic environment that anaerobic bacteria require.

== See also ==
- Exotoxin
