= Hemolysin =

Molecule destroying the membrane of red blood cells

Leukocidin/Hemolysin toxin
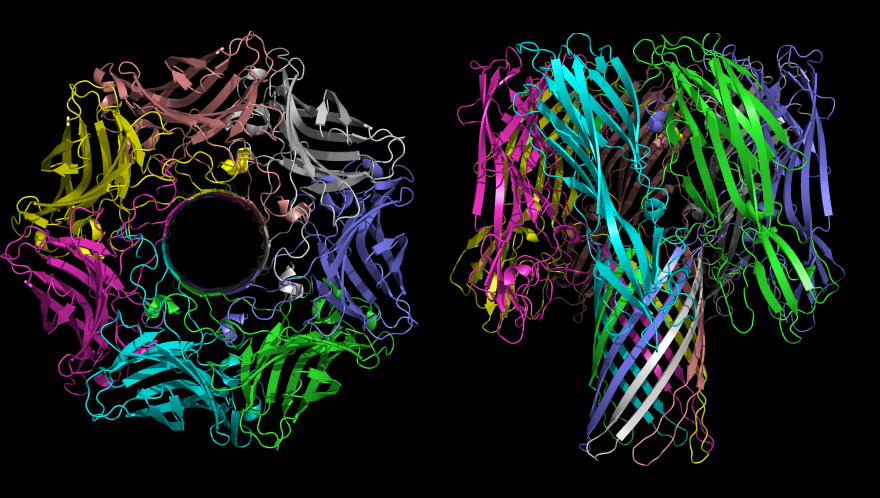
- Staphylococcus aureus alpha toxin from S. aureus (PDB: 7AHL)

Identifiers
- Symbol: Leukocidin
- Pfam: PF07968
- Pfam clan: CL0636
- InterPro: IPR036435
Available protein structures:
- PDB: IPR036435 PF07968 (ECOD; PDBsum)
- AlphaFold: IPR036435; PF07968

Hemolysins or haemolysins are lipids and proteins that cause lysis of red blood cells by disrupting the cell membrane. Although the lytic activity of some microbe-derived hemolysins on red blood cells may be of great importance for nutrient acquisition, many hemolysins produced by pathogens do not cause significant destruction of red blood cells during infection. However, hemolysins are often capable of lysing red blood cells in vitro.

While most hemolysins are protein compounds, some are lipid biosurfactants.

== Properties ==
Many bacteria produce hemolysins that can be detected in the laboratory. It is now believed that many clinically relevant fungi also produce hemolysins. Hemolysins can be identified by their ability to lyse red blood cells in vitro.

Hemolysis by Streptococcus seen on a plate

Not only are the erythrocytes affected by hemolysins, but there are also some effects among other blood cells, such as leucocytes (white blood cells). Escherichia coli hemolysin is potentially cytotoxic to monocytes, lymphocytes and macrophages, leading them to autolysis and death.

Visualization of hemolysis (UK: haemolysis) of red blood cells in agar plates facilitates the categorization of Streptococcus.

== Mechanism ==
One way hemolysin lyses erythrocytes is by forming pores in phospholipid bilayers. Other hemolysins lyse erythrocytes by hydrolyzing the phospholipids in the bilayer.

=== Pore formation ===
Many hemolysins are pore-forming toxins (PFT), which are able to cause the lysis of erythrocytes, leukocytes, and platelets by producing pores on the cytoplasmic membrane.

Hemolysin is normally secreted by the bacteria in a water-soluble way. These monomers diffuse to the target cells and are attached to them by specific receivers. After this is done, they oligomerize, creating ring-shaped heptamer complexes.

Hemolysins can be secreted by many different kinds of bacteria such as Staphylococcus aureus, Escherichia coli or Vibrio parahaemolyticus among other pathogens. We can take a look at the bacterium Staphylococcus aureus as a specific example of pore-forming hemolysin production. Staphylococcus aureus is a pathogen that causes many infectious diseases such as pneumonia and sepsis. It produces a ring-shaped complex called a staphylococcal alpha-hemolysin pore. In nature, Staphylococcus aureus secretes alpha-hemolysin monomers that bind to the outer membrane of susceptible cells. Upon binding, the monomers oligomerize to form a water-filled transmembrane channel that facilitates uncontrolled permeation of water, ions, and small organic molecules. Rapid discharge of vital molecules such as ATP, dissipation of the membrane potential and ion gradients, and irreversible osmotic swelling leading to the cell wall rupture (lysis) can cause death of the host cell.

This pore consists of seven alpha-hemolysin subunits, which represent the major cytotoxic agent that is freed by this kind of bacterium. These subunits attach to the target cells in the manner described before, and extend the lipid bilayer, forming the pore structures. These pores in the cellular membrane will eventually end up causing cell death, since it allows the exchange of monovalent ions that would cause the DNA fragmentation.

=== Enzymatic ===
Some hemolysins damage the erythrocyte membrane by cleaving the phospholipids in the membrane.

=== Staphylococcus aureus hemolysins ===
==== α-Hemolysin ====
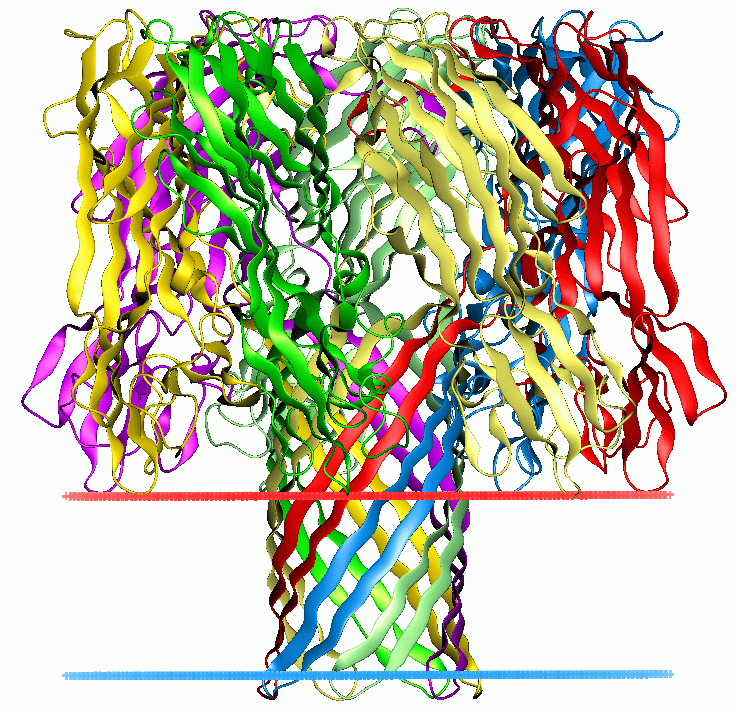
Alpha(α)-hemolysin of Staphylococcus aureus: macromolecular structure of the transmembrane pore

Secreted by Staphylococcus aureus, this toxin binds with the outer membrane, with subsequent oligomerization of the toxin monomers to form water-filled channels. These are responsible for osmotic phenomena, cell depolarization and loss of vital molecules (v.gr. ATP), leading to cell death.

==== β-Hemolysin ====
β-Hemolysin (hlb; Q2FWP1) is a phospholipase C toxin secreted by S. aureus. Upon investigating sheep erythrocytes, its toxic mechanism was discovered to be the hydrolysis of a specific membrane lipid, sphingomyelin, which accounts for 50% of the cell's membrane. This degradation was followed by a noticeable rise of phosphoryl-choline due to the release of organic phosphorus from sphingomyelin and ultimately caused cell lysis.

==== γ-Hemolysin ====
γ-Hemolysins are pore-forming toxins in the same family as α-hemolysin. They are unique in that they come in two components, and hence are referred to as bi-component toxins (InterPro: IPR003963). Compared to beta-hemolysin, it has a higher affinity for phosphocholines with short saturated acyl chains, especially if they have a conical form, whereas cylindrical lipids (e.g., sphingomyelin) hinder its activity. The lytic process, most commonly seen in leucocytes, is caused by pore formation induced by an oligomerized octamer that organizes in a ring structure. Once the prepore is formed, a more stable one ensues, named β-barrel. In this final part, the octamer binds with phosphatidylcholine.

== Structure ==
The structure of several hemolysins has been solved by X-ray crystallography in the soluble and pore-forming conformations. For example, α-hemolysin of Staphylococcus aureus forms a homo-heptameric β-barrel in biological membranes. The Vibrio cholerae cytolysin also forms a heptameric pore, however Staphylococcus aureus γ-hemolysin forms a pore that is octameric.

The heptamer of α-hemolysin from Staphylococcus aureus has a mushroom-like shape and measures up to 100 Å in diameter and 100 Å in height. A membrane-spanning, solvent-accessible channel runs along the sevenfold axis and ranges from 14 Å to 46 Å in diameter. On the exterior of the 14-strand antiparallel β barrel there is a hydrophobic belt approximately 30 Å in width that provides a surface complementary to the nonpolar portion of the lipid bilayer. The interfaces are composed of both salt-links and hydrogen bonds, as well as hydrophobic interactions, and these contacts provide a molecular stability for the heptamer in SDS solutions even up to 65 °C.

== Role during infection ==
Hemolysins are thought to be responsible for many events in host cells. For example, iron may be a limiting factor in the growth of various pathogenic bacteria. Since free iron may generate damaging free radicals, free iron is typically maintained at low concentrations within the body. Red blood cells are rich in iron-containing heme. Lysis of these cells releases heme into the surroundings, allowing the bacteria to take up the free iron. But hemolysin is related to bacteria not only in this way but also in some others.

As mentioned before, hemolysin is a potential virulence factor produced by microorganisms, which can put a human's health at risk. Despite causing some severe pathologies, many cases of hemolysis do not suppose a health hazard. But the fact that hemolysins (produced by pathogenic microorganisms during infections) are combined with other virulence factors may threaten a human's life to a greater extent.

The main consequence of hemolysis is hemolytic anemia, condition that involves the destruction of erythrocytes and their later removal from the bloodstream, earlier than expected in a normal situation. As the bone marrow cannot make erythrocytes fast enough to meet the body's needs, oxygen does not arrive to body tissues properly. As a consequence, some symptoms may appear, such as fatigue, pain, arrhythmias, an enlarged heart or even heart failure, among others.

Depending on the type of hemolysin and the microorganism that produces it, manifestation of symptoms and diseases may differ from one case to the other:

- Alpha-hemolysin from uropathogenic E. coli produces extra-intestinal infections and can cause cystitis, pyelonephritis, and sepsis. Alpha-hemolysin from Staphylococcus aureus can cause severe diseases, such as pneumonia.
- Aerolysin from Aeromonas sobria infects the intestinal tract, but it might also cause sepsis and meningitis.
- Listeriolysin from Listeria monocytogenes (a facultative intracellular bacterium that thrives within host cells, mainly macrophages and monocytes) causes the degradation of phagosome membranes, but they are not a potential danger for the cell's plasmatic membrane.

Both aerolysin and alpha-hemolysin are synthesized by extracellular bacteria, which infect specific tissue surfaces.

Hemolysins have proved to be a damaging factor for vital organs, through the activity of Staphylococcus aureus. S. aureus is a dangerous pathogen that may lead cells to necrotizing infections usually recognized by a massive inflammatory response leading to tissue damage or even tissue destruction. There is a clear example of this: the pneumonia produced by S. aureus. In this case, it has been proven that alpha-hemolysin takes part in inducing necrotic pulmonary injury by the use of the NLRP3 inflammasome, which is responsible for inflammatory processes and of pyroptosis. Pneumonia caused by S. aureus is a common disease in some areas, which is the reason for the many studies in the field of immunology aimed at developing new farmacs to cure easily or prevent this kind of pneumonia. At the moment, apiegnin and beta-cyclodextrin are thought to alleviate S. aureus pneumonia, whereas the antibodies of anti alpha-hemolysin are thought to give protection.

Further findings show that the main virulence factor of S. aureus, the pore-forming toxin α-hemolysin (Hla), is the secreted factor responsible for the activation of an alternative autophagic pathway. It has been demonstrated that this autophagic response is inhibited by artificially elevating the intracellular levels of cAMP. This process is also mediated by the exchange factors RAPGEF3 and RAP2B.

Another interesting point is that pretreatment of leukocytes with doses of alpha-hemolysin at which nearly 80% of the cells survived decreased the ability of the cells to phagocytize bacteria and particles and to undergo chemotaxis. Premature activation of leukocytes and inhibition of phagocytosis and chemotaxis by alpha-hemolysin, if they occur in vivo, would greatly enhance the survival of an E. coli attack.

Some hemolysins, such as listeriolysin O, allow bacteria to evade the immune system by escaping from phagosomes. Hemolysins may also mediate bacterial escape from host cells.

=== Regulation of gene expression ===
The regulation of gene expression of hemolysins (such as streptolysin S) is a system repressed in the presence of iron. This ensures that hemolysin is produced only when needed. The regulation of the production of hemolysin in S. aureus (expression of hemolysin) is now possible due to in vitro mutations that are related to serine/threonine kinase and phosphatase.

== Treatment ==
As hemolysins are produced by pathogenic organisms, the main treatment is the intake of antibiotics specific to the pathogen that have caused the infection. Moreover, some hemolysins may be neutralized by the action of anti-hemolysin antibodies, preventing a longer and more dangerous effect of hemolysis within the body.

When blood cells are being destroyed too fast, extra folic acid and iron supplements may be given or, in case of emergencies, a blood transfusion. In rare cases, the spleen must be removed because it filters blood and removes dead or damaged cells from the bloodstream, worsening the lack of erythrocytes.

== Applications ==
=== Medicine ===
Thermostable Direct Hemolysin (TDH; InterPro: IPR005015) produced by Vibrio parahaemolyticus is now being studied in the field of oncology. It regulates cell proliferation in colon carcinoma cells. TDH induces Ca^{2+} influx from an extracellular environment accompanied by protein kinase C phosphorylation. Activated protein kinase C inhibits the tyrosine kinase activity of epidermal growth factor receptor (EGFR), the rational target of anti-colorectal cancer therapy.

== See also ==
- Hemolysis (microbiology)
- Pore-forming toxins
- Staphylococcus aureus
