= Vibrio tubiashii =

Scientific classification
- Domain: Bacteria
- Kingdom: Pseudomonadati
- Phylum: Pseudomonadota
- Class: Gammaproteobacteria
- Order: Vibrionales
- Family: Vibrionaceae
- Genus: Vibrio
- Species: V. tubiashii

Binomial name
- Vibrio tubiashii Hada et al., 1984

Species of bacterium

Vibrio tubiashii is a Gram-negative, rod-shaped (0.5 um-1.5 um) marine bacterium that uses a single polar flagellum for motility. It has been implicated in several diseases of marine organisms.

== Discovery ==
Vibrio tubiashii was originally isolated from juvenile and larval bivalve mollusks suffering from bacillary necrosis, now called vibriosis. It was originally discovered by Tubiash et al. in 1965, hence the name, but not properly described until Hada et al. in 1984. Since its discovery and identification, V. tubiashii has been implicated in shellfish vibriosis across the globe, and more recently, coral diseases.

== Pathogenicity ==
Like many Vibrio spp., V. tubiashii produces extracellular enzymes, specifically a zinc-metalloprotease and a cytolysin/hemolysin that are nearly identical to those produced by other pathogenic Vibrio strains. This being said, only the zinc-metalloprotease elicited disease symptoms in Crassostrea gigas consistent with vibriosis. In addition to shellfish disease, Vibrio-derived zinc-metalloprotease could be an integral virulence factor in diseases of scleractinian corals as it was shown to cause photoinactivation of the coral endosymbiont Symbiodinium, leading to tissue color loss and eventual tissue death.

The hemolytic activity of V. tubiashii cultures increases during early growth stages and progressively decreases throughout the stationary phase, while proteolytic activity shows a gradual increase starting in the early stationary phase, suggesting that pathogenesis in this organism requires higher cell density.
