= Sea anemone cytotoxic protein =

Anemone_cytotox
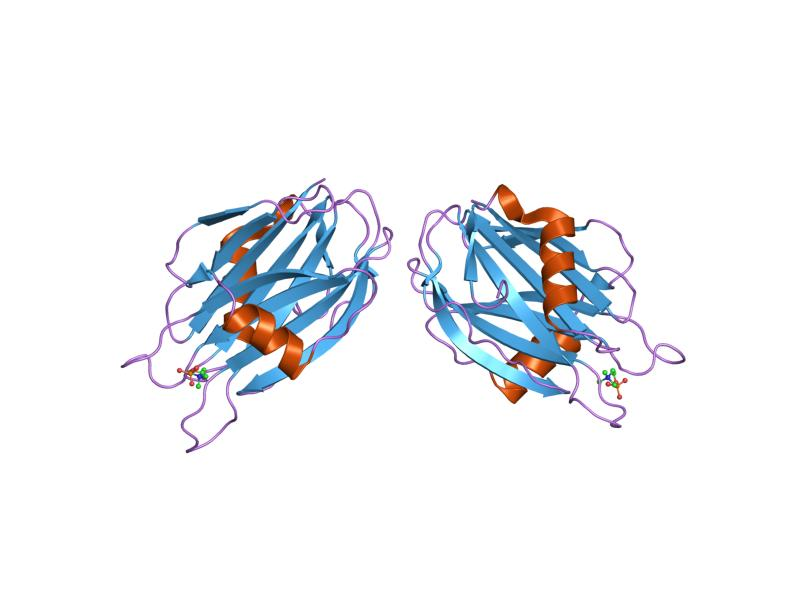
- crystal structure of the water-soluble state of the pore-forming cytolysin sticholysin ii complexed with phosphorylcholine

Identifiers
- Symbol: Anemone_cytotox
- Pfam: PF06369
- InterPro: IPR009104
- SCOP2: 1kd6 / SCOPe / SUPFAM
- TCDB: 1.C.38
- OPM superfamily: 168
- OPM protein: 4tsy
Available protein structures:
- PDB: IPR009104 PF06369 (ECOD; PDBsum)
- AlphaFold: IPR009104; PF06369

In molecular biology, the sea anemone cytotoxic proteins are lethal pore-forming proteins, known collectively as actinoporins, a sub-class of cytolysins. There are several different groups of cytolysins based on their structure and function. This entry represents the most numerous group, the 20kDa highly basic peptides. These cytolysins form cation-selective pores in sphingomyelin-containing membranes. Examples include equinatoxins (from Actinia equina), sticholysins (from Stichodactyla helianthus), magnificalysins (from Heteractis magnifica), and tenebrosins (from Actinia tenebrosa), which exhibit pore-forming, haemolytic, cytotoxic, and heart stimulatory activities.

Cytolysins adopt a stable soluble structure, which undergoes a conformational change when brought in contact with a membrane, leading to an active, membrane-bound form that inserts spontaneously into the membrane. They often oligomerise on the membrane surface, before puncturing the lipid bilayers, causing the cell to lyse. The 20kDa sea anemone cytolysins require a phosphocholine lipid headgroup for binding, however sphingomyelin is required for the toxin to promote membrane permeability. The crystal structures of equinatoxin II and sticholysin II both revealed a compact beta-sandwich consisting of ten strands in two sheets flanked on each side by two short alpha-helices, which is a similar topology to osmotin. It is believed that the beta sandwich structure attaches to the membrane, while a three-turn alpha helix lying on the surface of the beta sheet may be involved in membrane pore formation, possibly by the penetration of the membrane by the helix.

== Structure ==
Actinoporins are small (~20 kDa) pore-forming proteins produced by sea anemones. Their structure consists of a β-sandwich core flanked by two α-helices. One of these α-helices, located at the N-terminus, is flexible in solution and plays a critical role in membrane insertion during pore formation. The overall fold is highly conserved among actinoporins and is critical for their ability to interact with lipid membranes.

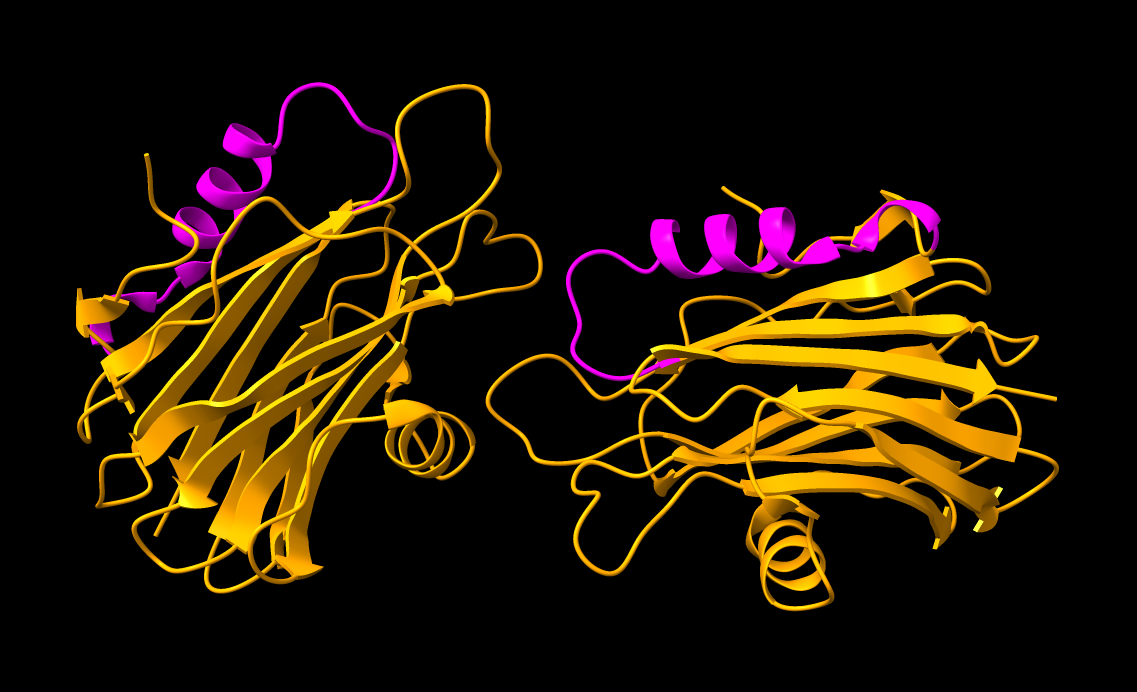
The N-terminal α-helix of Sticholysin II (residues ~10–30) is highlighted in magenta. This region is critical for the protein's cytolytic function, as it undergoes a conformational change and inserts into the target membrane during pore formation. Once inserted, N-terminal helices from multiple actinoporin monomers assemble to form a transmembrane pore, allowing ion flux and triggering osmotic lysis of the target cell. The structure was visualized using ChimeraX based on PDB ID 1GWY.

== Pore formation mechanism ==
Actinoporins exert their cytolytic activity by recognizing sphingomyelin-rich membranes. Upon binding, the flexible N-terminal α-helix inserts into the membrane lipid bilayer. This insertion initiates oligomerization of several actinoporin molecules, leading to the formation of a pore that is selectively permeable to cations. The resulting osmotic imbalance causes cell swelling and lysis.

== Isoforms and genetic diversity ==
Many sea anemone species produce multiple actinoporin isoforms through gene duplication and diversification. These isoforms often vary slightly in their amino acid sequences, which can alter their pore-forming efficiency and cytolytic activity. For example, species like Actinia equina, Heteractis crispa, and Stichodactyla helianthus produce multiple distinct actinoporins with different biochemical properties.
