= Cholesterol-dependent cytolysin =

Family of toxins from bacteria

Cholesterol-binding cytolysin

Identifiers
- Symbol: Thiol_cytolysin
- Pfam: PF01289
- InterPro: IPR001869
- PROSITE: PDOC00436
- OPM superfamily: 108
- OPM protein: 1pfo
Available protein structures:
- PDB: IPR001869 PF01289 (ECOD; PDBsum)
- AlphaFold: IPR001869; PF01289

The thiol-activated Cholesterol-dependent Cytolysin (CDC) family (TC# 1.C.12) is a member of the MACPF superfamily. Cholesterol dependent cytolysins are a family of β-barrel pore-forming exotoxins that are secreted by gram-positive bacteria. CDCs are secreted as water-soluble monomers of 50-70 kDa, that when bound to the target cell, form a circular homo-oligomeric complex containing as many as 40 (or more) monomers. Through multiple conformational changes, the β-barrel transmembrane structure (~250 Å in diameter depending on the toxin) is formed and inserted into the target cell membrane. The presence of cholesterol in the target membrane is required for pore formation, though the presence of cholesterol is not required by all CDCs for binding. For example, intermedilysin (ILY; TC# 1.C.12.1.5) secreted by Streptococcus intermedius will bind only to target membranes containing a specific protein receptor, independent of the presence of cholesterol, but cholesterol is required by intermedilysin (ILY; TC# 1.C.12.1.5) for pore formation. While the lipid environment of cholesterol in the membrane can affect toxin binding, the exact molecular mechanism that cholesterol regulates the cytolytic activity of the CDC is not fully understood.

== Cyto-lethal effects ==
Once the pore is formed within the target cell membrane, the regulation of the intracellular environment and what enters and leaves the cell is lost. The pore being ~250 Å in diameter is large enough to allow the loss of amino acids, nucleotides, small and large proteins, as well as ions (Ca^{2+},Na^{+}, K^{+}, etc.). The influx of calcium in particular, which is involved in multiple molecular pathways, will have a large impact on cell survival. The pore will also lead to an influx of water, which may lead to blebbing and cell death.

=== Purpose ===
Bacteria invest energy into creating these toxins because they act as virulence factors. By targeting immune cells such as macrophages the bacteria will be protected against phagocytosis and destruction by respiratory burst.

== Structure ==
At the level of the primary structure, cholesterol dependent cytolysins (CDCs) display a high degree of sequence similarity ranging from 40% to 80%. This is mainly reflected in the conserved core of about 471 amino acids shared by all CDCs, which essentially corresponds to the sequence of pneumolysin, the shortest member of the family. CDCs with longer sequences usually display variations in the N-terminus, the functions of which are unknown for many members but for some are believed to serve various functions unrelated to secretion. For instance, listeriolysin O (LLO; TC# 1.C.12.1.7) from Listeria monocytogenes exhibits a proline rich sequence at its amino terminus that plays a role in the stability of LLO. The extreme case is lectinolysin (LLY; UniProt: B3UZR3) from some strains of Streptococcus mitis and S. pseudopneumoniae contain a functional fucose-binding lectin at the amino terminus. Furthermore, all CDCs contain a highly conserved undecapeptide, which is thought to be critical for cholesterol-mediated membrane recognition. The CDC monomer consist of 4 structural domains, with domain 4 (D4) being involved with membrane binding. Multiple CDC monomers will oligomerize once bound to the target cell membrane forming a β-barrel structure which will be inserted into the target cell membrane. The core section of amino acids, which are required for pore formation, are more conserved between CDCs, which is illustrated by similar three-dimensional structures and pore-forming mechanisms. The structurally conserved domain 4 of CDC contains four conserve loops L1-L3 and an undecapeptide region, which is believed to be involved in cholesterol dependent recognition. Single amino acid modifications in these loops prevented perfringolysin O (PFO; TC# 1.C.12.1.1), which is a CDC secreted by Clostridium perfringens from binding to cholesterol rich liposomes. More recently, Farrand et al. has shown that two amino acids, a threonine-leucine pair in loop L1, comprise the cholesterol binding motif and is conserved in all known CDCs.

Some CDC protein crystal structures available in RCSB include:

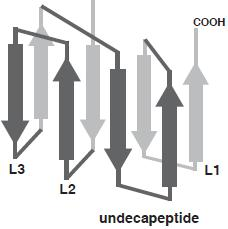
Domain 4 of Perfringolysin O with labeled loops L1, L2, L3, and Undecapeptide region.

== Prepore and pore assembly ==
The mechanism of pore formation of perfringolysin O (PFO; TC# 1.C.12.1.1), which is secreted by Clostridium perfringens, begins with encountering and binding to cholesterol on the target membrane. The C-terminus of PFO domain 4 (D4) encounters the membrane first. The binding of D4 triggers a structural rearrangement in which the PFO monomers oligomerize forming the pre-pore complex.

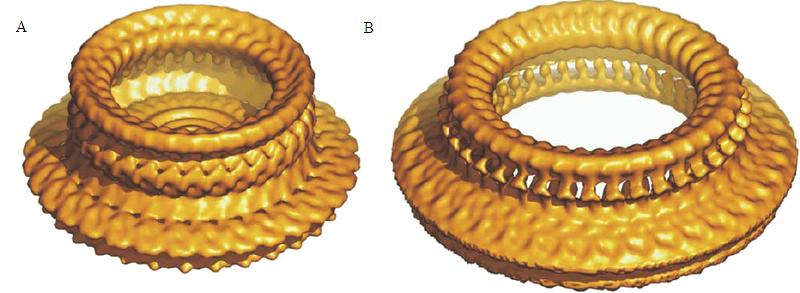
EM reconstruction of perfringolysin O pre-pore(A) and pore(B) structure.

The binding of CDC to the target membrane is required for oligomerization. The oligomerization of the CDC requires the conversion of alpha-helical regions to amphipathic beta-strands that is initiated by protein-lipid interactions or protein-protein interactions. The water-soluble form of the toxins is prevented from oligomerizing by having the access of one edge of a core β-sheet in the monomer blocked. To be specific, β5, a short polypeptide loop, hydrogen-bonds to β4, preventing β4 interaction with β1 on the adjacent monomer. The binding of D4 to the membrane surface triggers a conformational change in domain 3, which rotates β5 away from β4, exposing β4 allowing it to interact with the β1 strand of another PFO molecule, initiating oligomerization.

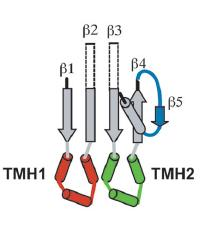
Water-soluble monomeric form of perfringolysin O (PFO) domain 3 showing β5 loop bound to β4 preventing premature oligomerization.

Unlike most of the exposed surface residues of CDC that are not conserved the residues at the surface of the D4 tip, which are involved in membrane interactions, are highly conserved. Pore formation begins once two amphipathic transmembrane β-hairpins from ~35 PFO monomers are inserted in a concerted fashion, which then create a large β-barrel that perforates the membrane. The toxin gets around the energy barrier, of inserting the CDC into the membrane, by the formation of the β-barrel, which will lower the energy requirements compared to what would be required for the insertion of single β-hairpins. In the water-soluble monomeric form of CDC, the transmembrane β-hairpins that are located on both sides of the central β-sheet on domain 3 are each folded as three short α-helices to minimize the exposure of hydrophobic residues. The α-helices are inserted into the target cell membrane bilayer and a conformational change takes place into amphipathic β-hairpins. A concerted mechanism of insertion is required so that the hydrophilic surfaces of the β-hairpins remain exposed to the aqueous medium, and not the hydrophobic membrane core.

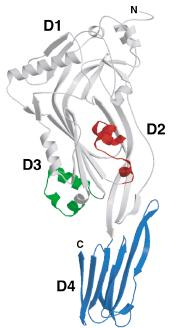
Ribbon representation of water-soluble monomeric form of perfringolysin O (PFO) with labeled domains.

Six short α-helices in D3 unfold to form two transmembrane β-hairpin (TMH), TMH1 (red) and TMH2 (green).

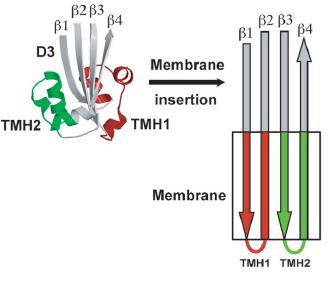
Ribbon structure of monomeric Perfringolysin O (PFO) domain 3, representing the transition of TMH1 (red) and TMH2 (green) from α-helices to β-sheet.

== Specificity ==
The binding of CDC to its target membrane requires the recognition of cholesterol or in the case of intermedilysin (ILY; TC# 1.C.12.1.5), the recognition of human CD59 membrane-anchored protein. The recognition of cholesterol provides specificity for eukaryotic cells and the specificity for the glycosylphosphatidylinositol-anchored protein CD59 provides specificity for human cells. Cholesterol is not required for intermedilysin (ILY) to bind to a target cell, as it uses human CD59 for initial attachment, but the presence of cholesterol is required for pore formation by all CDC. CDC are sensitive to both oxygen and cholesterol. Toxins isolated from culture supernatants, pre-incubated with cholesterol, were inactivated once exposed to oxygen. CDC are also pH-sensitive. A change of pH in a medium from 7.4 to 6.0 caused a conformational change in perfringolysin O, leading to an alteration in the minimum cholesterol threshold required for binding. Another CDC, listeriolysin O (LLO), which functions at an acidic pH, will lose its function at a neutral pH at temperatures above 30 °C, which trigger the irreversible loss of activity by the unfolding of domain 3 in the soluble monomer.

== Role of cholesterol ==
The presence of cholesterol in the membrane of the target cell is required for CDC pore formation. The arrangement of cholesterol molecules in the bilayer may also be important for successful binding. The non-polar hydrocarbon tail of cholesterol orients itself toward the hydrophobic center of the membrane lipid bilayer, while the 3-β-OH group is oriented closer to the ester bonds formed by the fatty acid chains, and glycerol backbones closer to the membrane surface. Even with the 3-β-OH group near the membrane surface, it is not very exposed compared to the phospholipid head groups. The availability of cholesterol at the membrane surface is dependent upon its interaction with other membrane components such as phospholipids and proteins; and the more cholesterol interacts with these components the less available it is to interact with extramembranous molecules. Some factors that affect cholesterol's availability are size of the polar head groups and the ability of the phospholipid to hydrogen bond with the 3-β-OH group of cholesterol. Cholesterol associates with phospholipids, forming a stoichiometric complex and contributes to membrane fluidity. If cholesterol concentration exceeds a certain point, free cholesterol will begin to precipitate out of the membrane. The binding and pore formation of CDC will occur when the concentration of cholesterol exceeds the association capacity of the phospholipids, allowing the excess cholesterol to associate with the toxin.

The presence of cholesterol aggregates in an aqueous solution were sufficient to initiate a conformation change and oligomerization of perfringolysin O (PFO), while no changes were seen by perfringolysin O with epicholesterol aggregates in solution. Epicholesterol is a sterol that differs from cholesterol by the orientation of the 3-β-OH group, which is axial in epicholesterol and equatorial in cholesterol. Since the orientation of the hydroxyl group has such an effect on the bind/pore-formation of CDC, the equatorial conformation may be required for docking of the sterol to the binding pocket in domain 4, or to be properly exposed at the surface of lipid structures.

== The conserved undecapeptide (Tryptophan-rich motif) of the CDCs ==
The conserved undecapeptide motif (ECTGLAWEWWR) in domain 4 of the CDCs is the signature motif of the CDCs and was originally thought to be the cholesterol binding motif, but that was shown to be incorrect in a number of studies and now, as described above, Farrand et al. showed that the cholesterol binding motif is a threonine-leucine pair in loop 1 at the base of domain 4. It has since been shown that the conserved undecapeptide is a key element in the allosteric pathway that couples membrane binding to the initiation of structural changes in domain 3 of the CDC monomer that allows it to begin the process of oligomerization into the prepore complex.

== Effects of other membrane lipids ==
The phospholipid composition of a cell membrane affects the arrangement of cholesterol within the membrane and the ability for CDC to bind and initiate pore-formation. For example, perfringolysin O will preferentially bind to cholesterol-rich membranes composed mainly of phospholipids containing 18-carbon acyl chains. Lipids having a conical molecular shape alter the energetic state of membrane cholesterol, augmenting the interaction of the sterol with the cholesterol-specific cytolysin. Since high cholesterol concentrations are required for CDC binding/pore-formation, it was thought that CDC would associate with lipid rafts. A later study showed that sphingomyelin, a necessary component of lipid raft formation, inhibited rather than promoted the binding of perfringolysin O to the target membrane.

== Possible coordination with other toxins ==
It is possible that the exposure of cholesterol at the membrane surface might be facilitated by other membrane-damaging toxins secreted such as phospholipase C, which cleave the head groups of phospholipids increasing the exposure of cholesterol. Two organisms, Clostridium perfringens that produces perfringolysin O (CDC) and α-toxin during clostridial myonecrosis and Listeria monocytogenes which releases listeriolysin O (CDC) and phospholipases C leading to the virulence of these bacteria. However, although the C. perfringens α-toxin treatment of liposome membranes increase the activity of PFO on those membranes this affect does not appear to aways be the case "in vivo". During C. perfringens gas gangrene (myonecrosis) the main site of action of the C. perfringens α-toxin is the muscle tissue, where the cleavage of the phospholipid head groups does not seem to increase the activity of perfringolysin O on this tissue, as knockouts of PFO do not appear to significantly alter the course of the myonecrosis. Therefore, cleavage of the headgroups in the muscle tissue by α-toxin does not appear to result in a significant increase in PFO activity on this tissue.

== Examples ==
- Intermedilysin O
- Lectinolysin
- Listeriolysin O
- Perfringolysin O
- Pneumolysin
- Suilysin O
- Streptolysin O
- Tetanolysin

== See also ==
- Cytolysin
- Exotoxin
- Pore-Forming Toxin
- Transporter Classification Database
