= Phagolysosome =

Cytoplasmic body from the fusion of the phagosome and lysosome

In biology, a phagolysosome, or endolysosome, is a cytoplasmic body formed by the fusion of a phagosome with a lysosome in a process that occurs during phagocytosis. Formation of phagolysosomes is essential for the intracellular destruction of microorganisms and pathogens. It takes place when the phagosome's and lysosome's membranes 'collide', at which point the lysosomal contents—including hydrolytic enzymes—are discharged into the phagosome in an explosive manner and digest the particles that the phagosome had ingested. Some products of the digestion are useful materials and are moved into the cytoplasm; others are exported by exocytosis.

The process of phagocytosis showing phagolysosome formation. Lysosome(shown in green) fuses with phagosome to form a phagolysosome.

Membrane fusion of the phagosome and lysosome is regulated by the Rab5 protein, a G protein that allows the exchange of material between these two organelles but prevents complete fusion of their membranes.

When the phagosome and lysosome interact with one another, they form a fully developed phagolysosome. A fully developed phagolysosome consists of digestive and aseptic properties. The purpose of phagolysosomes is to act as a protective barrier. It is a defense line that kills pathogenic bacteria that may have slipped through detection of the other immune system cells. The extracellular space that surrounds the lysosome is very acidic which is important for degradation because most cells cannot handle an acidic environment and will die, with an exception of a few.

== Function ==
Phagolysosomes function by reducing the pH of their internal environment. The phagolysosome becomes increasingly acidic through the action of V-ATPase proton pumps, reaching a pH as low as 4.5-5.0. This acidic environment is essential for the activation of hydrolytic enzymes and the denaturation of microbial proteins. This serves as a defense mechanism against microbes and other harmful parasites and also provides a suitable medium for degradative enzyme activity.

Microbes are destroyed within phagolysosomes by a combination of oxidative and non-oxidative processes. The oxidative process, also known as respiratory burst includes the "non-mitochondrial" production of reactive oxygen species.

By lowering pH and concentrations of sources of carbon and nitrogen, phagolysomes inhibit growth of fungi. An example is the inhibition of hyphae in Candida albicans.

In human neutrophils, the phagolysosomes destroy pathogens also by producing hypochlorous acid.

== Stages of Phagocytosis and Phagolysosome Formation ==
Phagocytosis and phagolysosome formation can be broken down into several discrete stages, each involving specific cellular processes and molecular players:

1. Signal Recognition: The process begins with the exposure of a signal on the target particle or cell. This signal, often referred to as an "eat-me" signal, is recognized by receptors on the surface of the phagocyte. The phagocyte then engulfs the extracellular pathogen or particle, entrapping it within its membrane.
2. Phagocytic Cup Formation: Upon signal recognition, additional receptors are recruited to the site, and the phagocyte's plasma membrane begins to extend around the target, forming a structure called the phagocytic cup.
3. Phagosome Formation: Once the phagocytic cup has almost completely surrounded the target, the membrane extensions seal together, forming an intact phagosome containing the engulfed material.
4. Phagosome Maturation: The newly formed phagosome undergoes a series of transitions similar to endosome maturation. This process involves the recycling of phagocytic receptors and the gradual acidification of the phagosome lumen. During this stage, the phagosome travels further into the cytosol.
5. Phagolysosome Formation: The maturing phagosome fuses with lysosomes, forming a phagolysosome. This fusion delivers hydrolytic enzymes into the phagosome, initiating the degradation of the engulfed material.
6. Cargo Degradation: Within the phagolysosome, degradation of the cargo begins, often starting with the breakdown of the cargo's membrane. Lysosomal hydrolases progressively break down the contents into smaller molecules, revealing cell components such as carbohydrates, lipids, and proteins.
7. Phagolysosome Resolution: In the final stage, the phagolysosome may undergo tubulation, releasing vesicles that can either reform lysosomes or facilitate further degradation of cargo. This process is crucial for recycling phagolysosomal components and completing the degradation of engulfed materials.

The fate of the digested material can vary. It may be killed through apoptosis, further engulfed by macrophages, or presented to T-cells to induce an immune reaction.

Interestingly, some proteins are involved in multiple stages of this process, indicating mechanistic overlap between these seemingly discrete steps. The entire process is regulated by conserved proteins involved in recognizing, engulfing, and processing extracellular debris.

Research using model organisms, particularly Caenorhabditis elegans, has been instrumental in identifying the molecular players involved in these stages and ordering them into distinct pathways. C. elegans offers several advantages for studying phagocytosis, including the ability to observe the process in live animals with endogenous cargos in situ. The predictable timing of cell deaths and engulfment in C. elegans allows for time-lapse imaging of each step at the single-cell level.

== Phagolysosome Resolution ==
Phagolysosome resolution is the final stage in the phagocytic process, involving the breakdown of engulfed material and the recycling of phagolysosomal components. Most studies do not image the process of phagocytosis to completion, instead using lysosome fusion or acidification of the phagolysosome lumen as endpoints. Additionally, this resolution stage is less well understood compared to earlier phases of phagocytosis, as it can take a significant amount of time. While engulfment and phagosome maturation can occur in minutes, degradation of phagolysosomal cargo can take hours to complete.

Process of Resolution

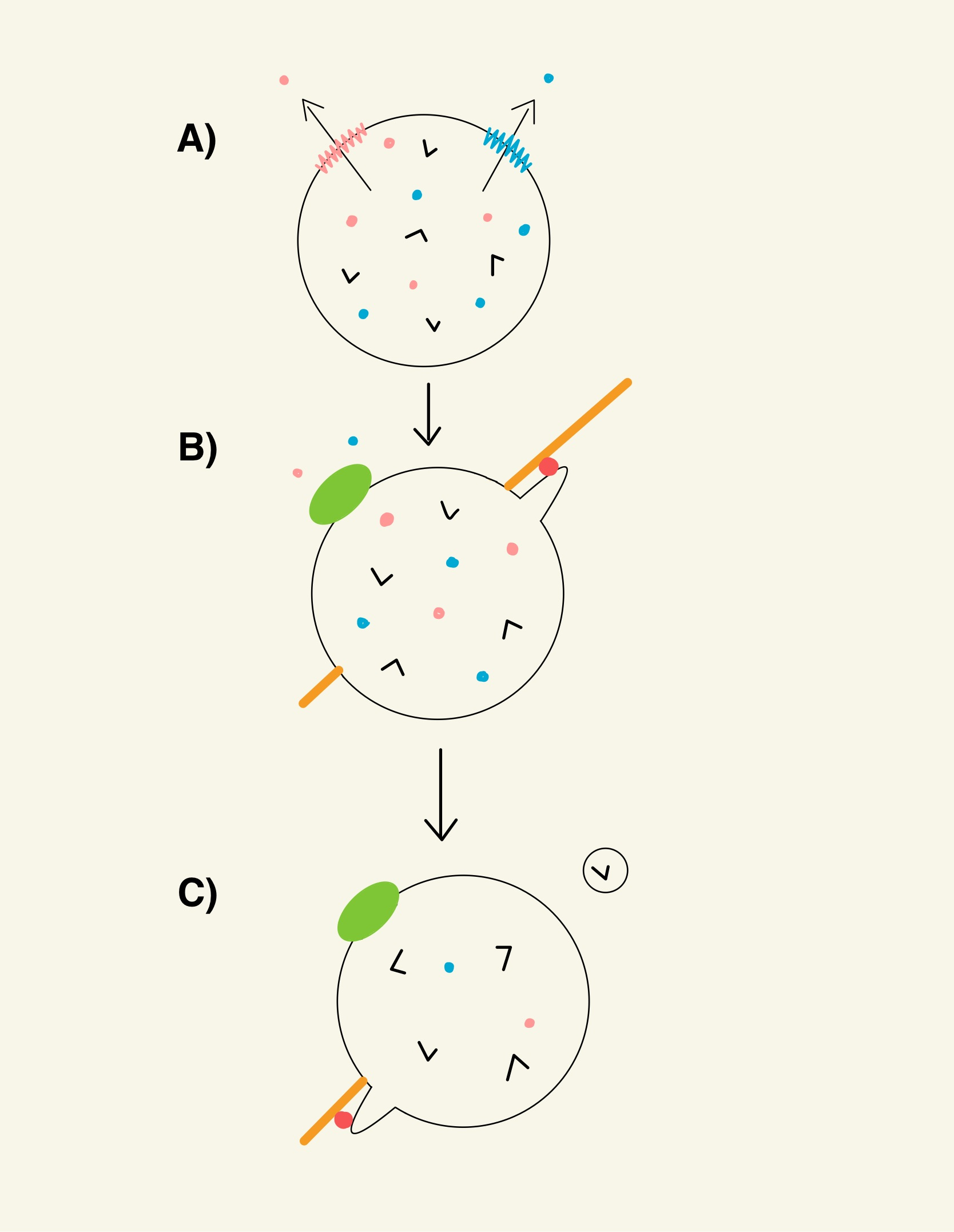
Amino acid transport and phagolysosome resolution in three stages: (A) Inside the phagolysosome, hydrolases break down proteins into amino acids, represented by pink and blue dots. Amino acid transporters, such as LAAT-1 (shown in pink) and SLC-36.1 (shown in blue), export these different amino acids from the phagolysosome lumen into the cytosol. (B) The exported amino acids activate mTOR (depicted in green). This activation leads to ARL-8-mediated tubulation. ARL-8 (shown in red) likely interacts with motor proteins and microtubules (represented in orange) to facilitate this process.(C) The tubulation process results in the formation of phagolysosomal vesicles. This cycle repeats until the phagolysosome is fully resolved.

After phagosome-lysosome fusion, the process of resolution can occur. Degradation begins with the breakdown of the cargo membrane to expose the cargo contents to lysosomal hydrolases. Lysosomal lipases are thought to target the cargo membrane while leaving the phagolysosomal membrane intact, possibly due to protection by glycosylated lysosomal membrane proteins. However, the exact mechanism by which lipases distinguish between these membranes remains unclear.

Once the cargo membrane is compromised, lysosomal proteases and nucleases, such as the cathepsin protease CPL-1 and the DNase II homolog NUC-1, degrade the phagolysosomal cargo proteins and nucleic acids. The resulting breakdown products, including amino acids, are then transported out of the phagolysosome by various transporters, including members of the solute carrier family like SLC-36.1 and the SLC66A1 ortholog LAAT-1.

The transport of breakdown products out of the phagolysosome serves multiple cellular functions. In immune cells, this process is crucial for antigen presentation, enabling the cell to communicate information about the degraded material to other components of the immune system. Additionally, the breakdown of phagolysosomal contents may contribute to cellular metabolism. The resulting molecules can serve as raw materials and energy sources for various cellular processes, potentially including the facilitation of subsequent rounds of phagocytosis. This efficient recycling of engulfed material highlights the phagolysosome's role not only in cellular defense but also in nutrient acquisition and energy management.

Membrane Dynamics

Recent time-lapse studies have revealed dynamic changes in phagolysosomal membranes during resolution. Within an hour of cargo membrane breakdown, the phagolysosome begins to tubulate and release vesicles. This process depends on the small GTPase ARL-8, which is associated with kinesin microtubule motor proteins. The released phagolysosomal vesicles play dual roles: they promote further degradation of cargo molecules and contribute to the reformation of lysosomes by retrieving lysosomal hydrolases and membrane proteins.

Signaling and Regulation

The export of degraded phagolysosomal contents, particularly amino acids, plays a crucial role in regulating phagolysosome resolution. Amino acid transport by proteins such as SLC-36.1 and subsequent amino acid sensing lead to mTOR signaling, which is necessary for phagolysosome tubulation and vesicle release. However, the exact mechanism linking mTOR signaling to ARL-8-mediated tubulation is not yet fully understood.

Importance for Cell Function

Phagolysosome resolution serves several important cellular functions:

1. Antigen presentation: In immune cells, the transport of breakdown products out of the phagolysosome is crucial for antigen presentation.
2. Metabolic support: The breakdown of phagolysosomal contents may provide raw materials and energy for cellular functions, including further rounds of phagocytosis.
3. Lysosome reformation: The vesicles released during phagolysosome resolution contribute to the reformation of lysosomes, thus supporting the next round of phagocytosis.
4. Cargo degradation: The tubulation and vesicle release processes promote the complete degradation of phagolysosomal cargo.

Despite recent advances, many aspects of phagolysosome resolution remain to be elucidated, including the specificity of lipases in membrane breakdown, potential cytosolic repair mechanisms for the phagolysosomal membrane, and the precise regulation of ARL-8 in promoting tubulation versus whole organelle movement.

== Pathogens ==
Coxiella burnetii, the causative agent of Q fever, thrives and replicates in the acidic phagolysosomes of its host cell. The acidity of the phagolysosome is essential for C.burnetii to transport glucose, glutamate, and proline, as well as for its synthesis of nucleic acids and proteins.

Similarly, when in its amastigote stage, Leishmania obtains all its purine sources, various vitamins, and a number of its essential amino acids from the phagolysosome of its host. Leishmania also obtain heme from the proteolysis of proteins in the host phagolysosome.
