= Listeriolysin O =

Identifiers
- Organism: Listeria monocytogenes serovar 1/2a (strain ATCC BAA-679 / EGD-e)
- Symbol: hly
- UniProt: P13128
Search for
- Structures: Swiss-model
- Domains: InterPro

Listeriolysin O (LLO) is a hemolysin produced by the bacterium Listeria monocytogenes, the pathogen responsible for causing listeriosis. The toxin may be considered a virulence factor, since it is crucial for the virulence of L. monocytogenes.

== Biochemistry ==
Listeriolysin O is a non-enzymatic, cytolytic, thiol-activated, cholesterol-dependent cytolysin; hence, it is activated by reducing agents and inhibited by oxidizing agents. However, LLO differs from other thiol-activated toxins, since its cytolytic activity is maximized at a pH of 5.5.

By maximizing activity at a pH of 5.5, LLO is selectively activated within the acidic phagosomes (average pH ~ 5.9) of cells that have phagocytosed L. monocytogenes. After LLO lyses the phagosome, the bacterium escapes into the cytosol, where it can grow intracellularly. Upon release from the phagosome, the toxin has little activity in the more basic cytosol.

Furthermore, LLO permits L. monocytogenes to escape from phagosomes into the cytosol without damaging the plasma membrane of the infected cell. This allows the bacteria to live intracellularly, where they are protected from extracellular immune system factors such as the complement system and antibodies.

LLO also causes dephosphorylation of histone H3 and deacetylation of histone H4 during the early phases of infection, prior to entry of L. monocytogenes into the host cell. The pore-forming activity is not involved in causing the histone modifications. The alterations of the histones cause the down regulation of genes encoding proteins involved in the inflammatory response. Thus, LLO may be important in subverting the host immune response to L. monocytogenes.

A PEST-like sequence is present in LLO and is considered essential for virulence, since mutants lacking the sequence lysed the host cell. However, contrary to PEST's supposed role in protein degradation, evidence suggests that the PEST-like sequence may regulate LLO production in the cytosol rather than increase degradation of LLO.

== Regulation of expression ==
Listeriolysin O is encoded by the gene hly, which is part of a pathogenicity island called LIPI-1. Transcription of hly, as well as other virulence factors of L. monocytogenes within LIPI-1, is activated by the protein encoded by prfA gene. prfA is thermoregulated by the PrfA thermoregulator UTR element, such that translation of prfA maximally occurs at 37 °C and is nearly silent at 30 °C. Since 37 °C is within the range of normal body temperature, PrfA protein, as well as listeriolysin O and other virulence factors regulated by PrfA, is only produced when L. monocytogenes is in a host.

== Medical application ==
A recombinant BCG vaccine against Mycobacterium tuberculosis is being developed that expresses listeriolysin O and lacks urease C. The ΔureC hly+ rBCG vaccine has significantly higher protection than the original BCG strain due to improved antigen presentation. Listeriolysin creates pores in the phagosome and allows the bacteria to escape into the cytosol, so antigens can be presented on both Class I and Class II major histocompatibility complex and activate CD8 and CD4 T-cells respectively. Urease produces ammonia and creates a basic environment which inhibits listeriolysin activity, so it is knocked out to provide the optimal pH.
