= Streptolysin =

Group of proteins

Streptolysin O

Identifiers
- Organism: Streptococcus pyogenes serotype M1
- Symbol: slo
- UniProt: P0C0I3
Search for
- Structures: Swiss-model
- Domains: InterPro

Streptolysin S

Identifiers
- Organism: Streptococcus pyogenes serotype M4 (strain MGAS10750)
- Symbol: sagA
- UniProt: Q1J7I0
Search for
- Structures: Swiss-model
- Domains: InterPro

Streptolysins are two homogenous exotoxins from Streptococcus pyogenes. Types include streptolysin O (SLO; slo), which is oxygen-labile, and streptolysin S (SLS; sagA), which is oxygen-stable.

SLO is part of the thiol-activated cytolysin family. It is hemolytically active only in a reversibly reduced state. It is antigenic, so its antibody antistreptolysin O can be detected in an antistreptolysin O titre.

SLS is stable in the presence of oxygen. It is not antigenic due to its small size. It is sometimes considered a bacteriocin due to similarities in the synthesis pathway.

== Streptolysin O ==
Streptolysin O (SLO; slo), is a bacterial toxin that has four protein domains which is known to make the plasma membranes in animal cells permeable. It does this by creating pore complexes within the membrane by first binding a monomer to the cholesterol found in the target membrane and then forming an oligomeric transmembrane pore. This toxin excreted by a Gram-positive bacteria Streptococcus pyogenes, under the classification of Thiol-activated cytolysin or CDCs. In order for Streptolysin O to work effectively, it needs a significant amount of cholesterol to be present in the target membrane. Unlike other Cholesterol-dependent cytolysins, SLO contains a 60 Amino acid N-terminal domain that makes it easier to identify.

Human serum albumin has been demonstrated to neutralize the cytotoxic and hemolytic effects of SLO through its binding in a non-conventional site located in domain II, previously reported to interact also with C. difficile toxins.

This toxin contains highly antigenic effects which causes it to produce the antibody anti-streptolysin O. Clinically, the presence of these antibodies can indicate a recent Group A streptococcal infection. Streptolysin O is also known to facilitate apoptosis in Keratinocytes. It is able to do this by translocating NAD+ glycohydrolase (SPN) across the target cells membrane. It then removes the N-terminal domain which stops SPN translocation leading to SPN mediated apoptosis.

=== Group A Streptococcus infections ===
Group A streptococcal infections are responsible for 517,000 deaths annually across the world. Not much is known about the exact mechanism of action in natural infections however, once the infection is present within the cells it can cause devastating effects. When tested in human endometrium cells, 50% of the cells were killed within the first two hours as a result of processes stimulated by Streptolysin O and SpeB proteases. It has also been observed that both Steptolysin O and SpeB protease limit the innate immune response.

== Streptolysin S ==
Streptolysin S (SLS; sagA), is a cytolytic virulence factor which is a member of the thiazole/oxadole-modified microcin (TOMM) family. This cytolysin is a post-translationally modified peptide was synthesized through a natural evolutionary pathway. SLS is responsible for Streptococcus pyogenes' β-hemolytic appearance when grown on blood agar plates. Its biosynthesis is not fully known; however, it is a critical virulence factor for Streptococcus pyogenes infections. SLS brings about its virulence by damaging soft tissue and it can also act as a signaling molecule. When introduced to a host it will affect its phagocytes and also help to introduce GAS across the skin barrier.

== Applications and Diagnostic Use of Streptolysin O (SLO) ==
Streptolysin O (SLO) is integral to the development of assays designed to detect Anti-Streptolysin O (ASO) antibodies in clinical settings. These assays are critical for diagnosing post-streptococcal diseases, such as acute rheumatic fever and post-streptococcal glomerulonephritis. The SLO antigen, when coupled with latex particles, induces a visible agglutination reaction in the presence of ASO antibodies, allowing for the detection of antibody levels in patient samples.
