= Coulthurst =

Coulthurst is a surname. Notable people with the surname include:

- Henry William Coulthurst (1753–1817), English Anglican priest and academic
- Josiah Coulthurst (1893–1970), English cricketer
- Sarah Coulthurst, molecular bacteriologist
