= Umbrella toxin =

Bacterial protein toxin

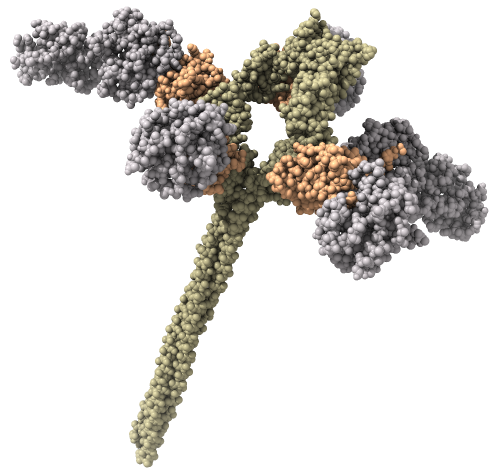
Structure of Umb1 visualized in ChimeraX using PDB structure (8W20). UmbA colored grey, UmbB colored tan, and UmbC colored pale green.

Umbrella toxins, or umbrella toxin proteins (Umbs), are a recently discovered multiprotein bacterial toxin encoded by Streptomyces species and other Actinobacteria. Unlike other well-studied bacterial toxins named after their source organisms, such as botulinum toxin, anthrax toxin, or the Bacillus thuringiensis (Bt) toxin, the umbrella toxin is named after its unique umbrella-like macromolecular morphology of a stalk with five spokes.

== Discovery ==
Prior to the discovery of umbrella toxins, the ALF repeat family was originally identified as a novel conserved region in Streptomyces through computational domain analysis. In the original description, the ALF domains occur as two sets of four forty-five-residue tandem repeats, with a low complexity or coiled-coil region following each set of repeats, suggesting a structural role in signal transduction or protein-protein interactions. The ALF repeat family corresponds to the Pfam domain PF03752, described as an alanine-rich repeat containing conserved phenylalanine residues.

== Biological function ==
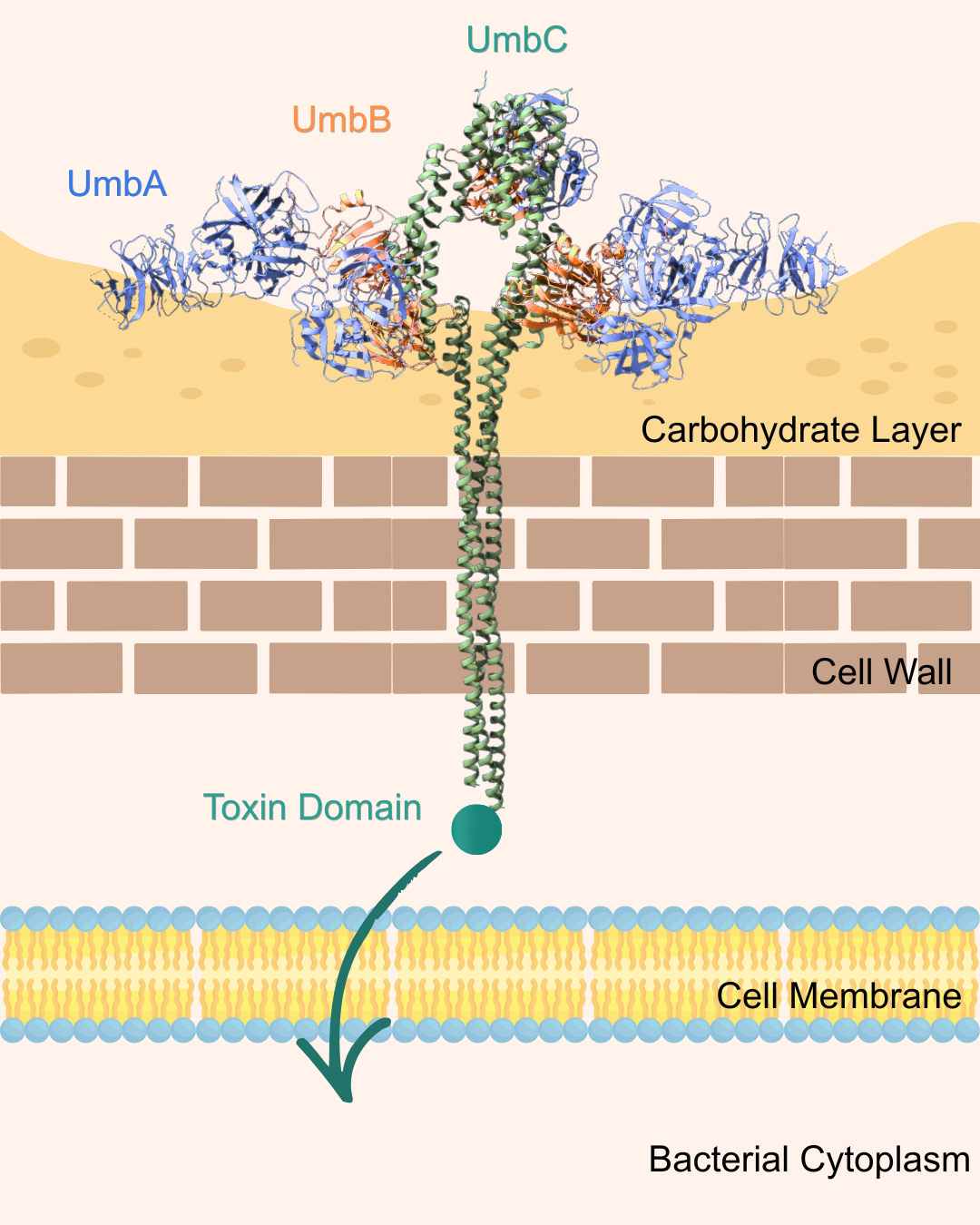
Model of intoxication of umbrella toxin. Toxin visualized in ChimeraX using PDB structure (8W20)

Umbrella toxins are antibacterial protein assemblies that help producing bacteria compete with neighboring microbes. In susceptible Streptomyces targets, they inhibit vegetative hyphal growth, causing growth arrest without blocking initial spore germination.

== Structure ==
A cryo-EM structure of the Streptomyces coelicolor umbrella toxin revealed a multimeric complex that adopts a lollipop-like shape approximately 300 Å in length, composed of three subunits: UmbA, UmbB, and UmbC.

UmbA: outer region of the spokes and contain a conserved trypsin region and a variable region predicted to include lectin domains at their distal tips.

UmbB: inner region of the spokes that interact with the trypsin domain of UmbA and the alanine leucine phenylalanine-rich (ALF) regions of UmbC.

UmbC: the central structural and toxic component of the umbrella toxin complex. UmbC proteins consist of a ring formed by 8 ALF degenerate repeats on one end, connected via coiled-coil domains which converge to form a stalk.

UmbC1 contains a toxin domain that interacts with UmbA and UmbB to form a protein complex that resembles an umbrella. This step is necessary for toxin recruitment to target cells. UmbA mediate particle recruitment and receptor binding. The EM density map of the C-terminal toxin and HINT domains of UmbC1 and the lectin domains of UmbA1 spokes are not well resolved.

The lectin domain of UmbA specifically binds to a surface glycoconjugate called teichuronic acid (TUA). In the TUA–UmbA structure, the UmbA lectin domain adopts a β-propeller fold that mediates direct interaction with TUA molecules.

== Potential clinical significance ==
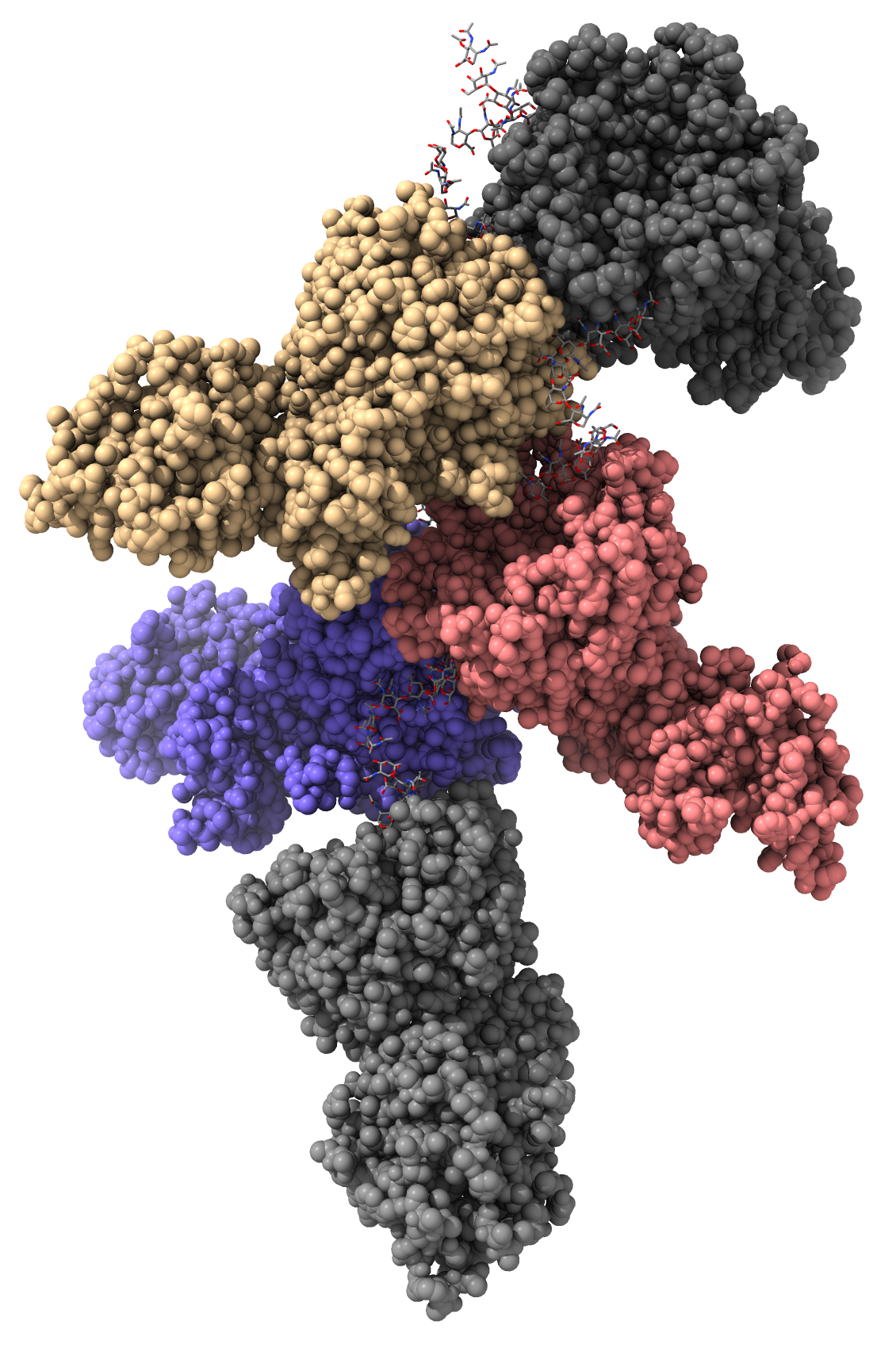
Structure of TUA molecule bound UmbA4 complex (PDB 9OEE).

Mycobacterium tuberculosis and Corynebacterium diphtheriae are two human pathogens which have an increasing rate of antibiotic resistance. These pathogens which result in tuberculosis and diphtheria, respectively, are potential Umb targets. Research from the University of Washington School of Medicine suggests that these toxins may be strong candidates for targeted drug delivery with improved specificity for treating these diseases.

== See also ==
- Toxin
- Microbial toxin
- Polymorphic toxins
- Contact-dependent growth inhibition
