= Fleming Prize Lecture =

Scientific award in microbiology

- Awarded for: early career researchers who have an outstanding research record and made a distinct contribution to microbiology
- Presented by: Microbiology Society, UK
- First award: 1976

The Fleming Prize Lecture was started by the Microbiology Society in 1976 and named after Alexander Fleming, one of the founders of the society. It is for early career researchers, generally within 12 years of being awarded their PhD, who have an outstanding independent research record making a distinct contribution to microbiology. Nominations can be made by any member of the society. Nominees do not have to be members.

The award is £1,000 and the awardee is expected to give a lecture based on their research at the Microbiology Society's Annual Conference.

== List ==
The following have been awarded this prize.

- 1976 Graham Gooday Biosynthesis of the Fungal Wall – Mechanisms and Implications
- 1977 Peter Newell Cellular Communication During Aggregation of Dictyostelium
- 1978 George AM Cross Immunochemical Aspects of Antigenic Variation in Trypanosomes
- 1979 John Beringer The Development of Rhizobium Genetics
- 1980 Duncan James McGeoch Structural Analysis of Animal Virus Genomes
- 1981 Dave Sherratt The Maintenance and Propagation of Plasmid Genes in Bacterial Populations
- 1982 Brian Spratt Penicillin-binding Proteins and the Future of β-Lactam Antibiotics
- 1983 Ray Dixon The Genetic Complexity of Nitrogen Fixation Herpes Siplex and The Herpes Complex
- 1984 Paul Nurse Cell Cycle Control in Yeast
- 1985 Jeffrey Almond Genetic Diversity in Small RNA Viruses
- 1986 Douglas Kell Forces, Fluxes and Control of Microbial Metabolism
- 1987 Christopher Higgins Molecular Mechanisms of Membrane Transport: from Microbes to Man
- 1988 Gordon Dougan An Oral Route to Rational Vaccination
- 1989 Andrew Davison Varicella-Zoster Virus
- 1989 Graham J Boulnois Molecular Dissection of the Host-Microbe Interaction in Infection
- 1990 No award
- 1991 Lynne Boddy The Ecology of Wood- and Litter-rotting Basidiomycete Fungi
- 1992 Geoffrey L Smith Vaccinia Virus Glycoproteins and Immune Evasion
- 1993 Neil Gow Directional Growth and Guidance Systems of Fungal Pathogens
- 1994 Ian Roberts Bacterial Polysaccharides in Sickness and in Health and Charles Dorman DNA Topology and the Global Regulation of Bacterial Virulence Gene Expression
- 1995 No award
- 1996 Tony Carr Cell Division and Mitosis in the Fission Yeast Schizosaccharomyces pombe
- 1997 Colin J Stirling Protein Targeting to the Endoplasmic Reticulum in Yeast
- 1998 No award
- 1999 David Richardson Bacterial Respiration: a Flexible Process for a Changing Environment
- 2000 Peter Simmons The Origin and Evolution of Hepatitis Viruses in Humans
- 2001 Brendan Kenny Enteropathogenic Escherichia coli
- 2002 Tracy Palmer and Ben Berks Moving Folded Proteins Across the Bacterial Cell Membrane
- 2003 Chris Bishoff AIDS-associated Cancer and KSHV/HHV-8
- 2004 Mark Paget Managing Redox Stress in Bacteria
- 2005 Adrian Whitehouse Understanding the Latent-Lytic Switch in Gamma-2 Herpesviruses
- 2006 Frank Sargent Constructing the Wonders of the Bacterial World: Biosynthesis of Complex Enzymes
- 2007 Greg Challis Mining Microbial Genomes for New Natural Products and Biosynthetic Pathways
- 2008 Cameron Simmons Understanding Emerging Pathogens: H5N1 Influenza and Dengue in Vietnam
- 2009 Nicola Stanley-Wall The Complexity of Biofilm Formation by Bacillus subtilis
- 2010 Steve Diggle Microbial Communication and Virulence: Lessons from Evolutionary Theory
- 2011 Peter Cherepanov Structural Biology of Retroviral DNA Integration
- 2012 William Hanage Plagues and Populations - Patterns of Pathogen Evolution
- 2013 No award
- 2014 Nikolay Zenkin Multiple personalities of RNA polymerase active centre
- 2015 Michael Brockhurst Rapid microbial evolution: From the lab to the clinic and back again
- 2016 David Grainger The unexpected complexity of bacterial genomes
- 2017 Stephen Baker The collateral damage of antimicrobial access in Asia
- 2018 Sarah Coulthurst type VI secretion system-mediated bacterial warfare
- 2019 Peter Fineran bacterial innate and adaptive immune systems
- 2020 Edze Westra molecular mechanisms and evolutionary ecology of CRISPR-Cas systems.
- 2021 Britt Koskella bacteria and viruses of the plant microbiome
- 2023 Tanmay A. M. Bharat research on prokaryotic surface layers and biofilms
- 2024 Daniel Streicker Preventing virus transmission between species
- 2025 Antonia Ho
