= Joyoti Basu =

Indian medical researcher (born 1957)

- Born: 17 December 1957 (age 68); West Bengal, India
- Education: Presidency college, Calcutta; Calcutta University; Bose Institute; University of Liège
- Known for: Studies on interaction of mycobacteria with host macrophages
- Awards: 1989 INSA Young Scientist Medal; 2002 N-BIOS Prize
- Scientific career
- Fields: Biochemistry; Cell biology
- Workplaces: Bose Institute
- Doctoral advisor: Parul Chakrabarti; Jean-Marie Ghuysen

Joyoti Basu (born 17 December 1957) is an Indian biochemist, cell biologist and a senior professor at the Bose Institute. Known for her studies on the membrane structure of red blood cells, Basu is an elected fellow of all three major Indian science academies, namely the National Academy of Sciences, India, the Indian Academy of Sciences and the Indian National Science Academy, as well as the Indian Society for Chemical Biology. The Department of Biotechnology of the Government of India awarded her the National Bioscience Award for Career Development, one of the highest Indian science awards, for her contributions to biosciences in 2002.

== Early life and education ==
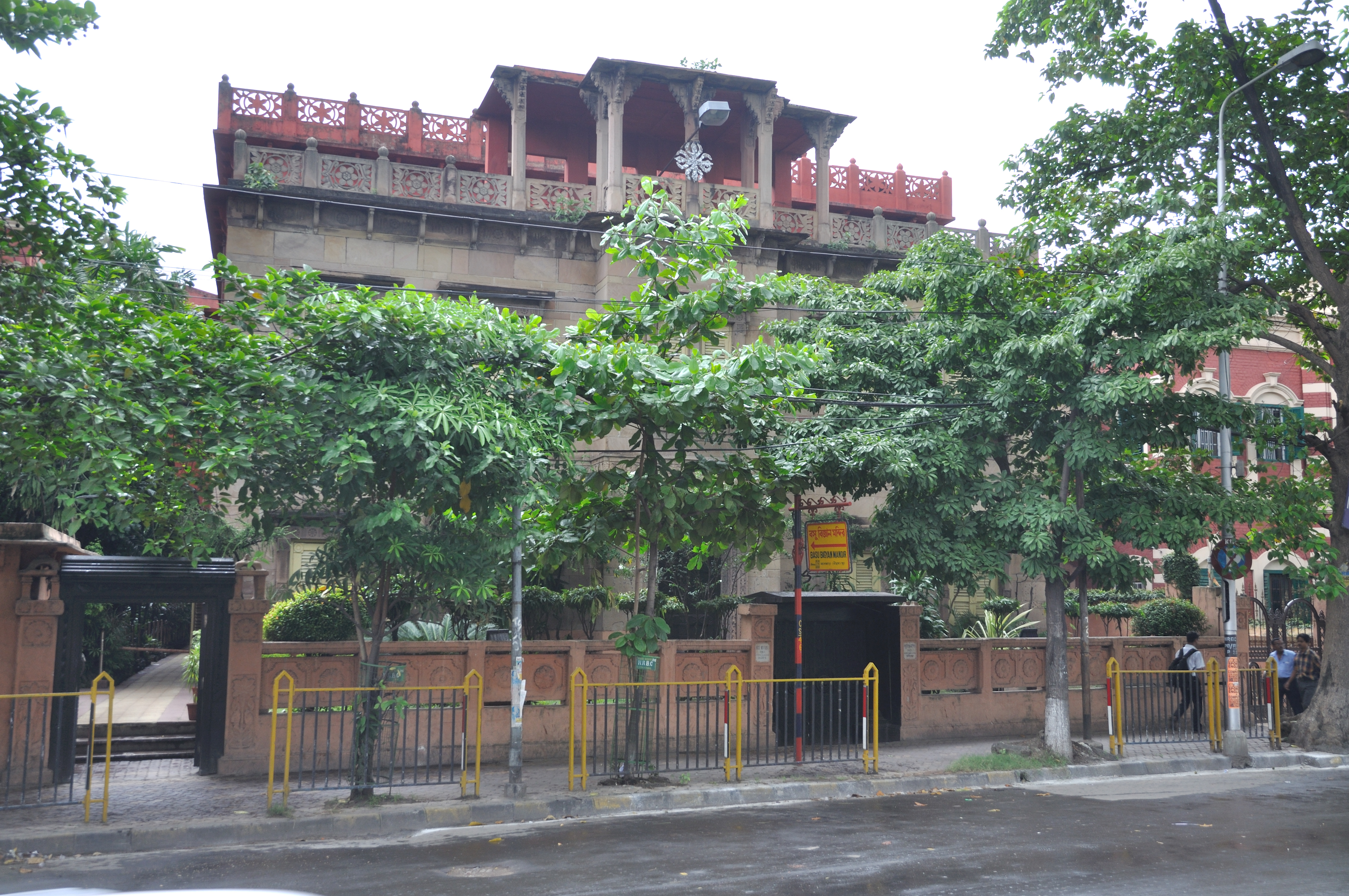
Bose Institute.

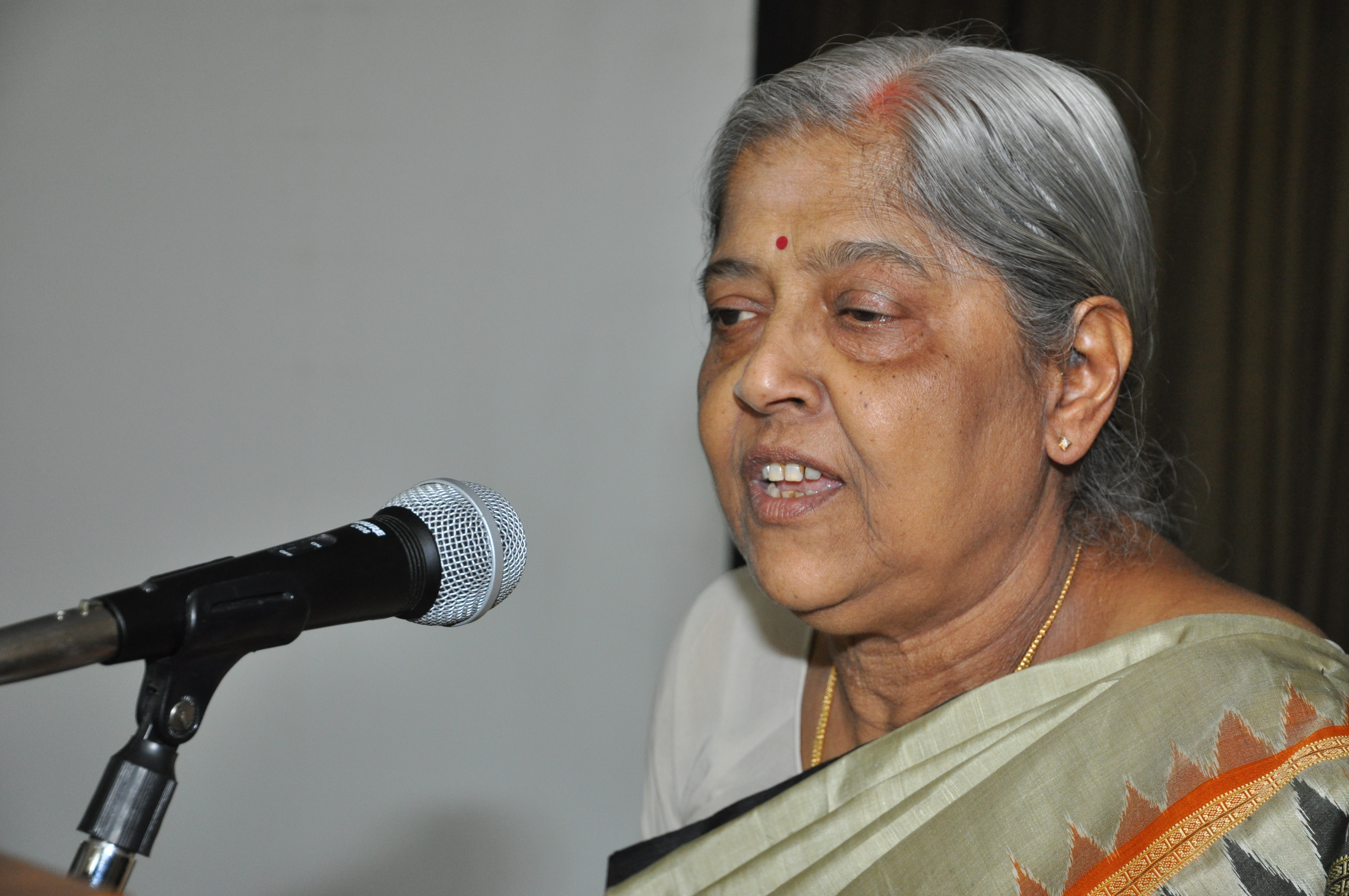
Parul Chakrabarti - Basu's mentor at Bose Institute

Born on 17 December 1957 in the Indian state of West Bengal, Joyoti Basu did her undergraduate studies at the Presidency College, Kolkata and after completing the BSc honors in chemistry, she obtained an MSc from the University of Calcutta. Her doctoral research was at the Bose Institute, Kolkata under the guidance of Parul Chakrabarti, which earned her a PhD from Calcutta University. She did her post-doctoral work at the laboratory of Jean-Marie Ghuysen at the University of Liège working on mycobacterial cell division and mycobacterial peptidoglycan-biosynthesizing enzymes. She joined Bose Institute in 1991 as a faculty member at the department of Chemistry.

== Controversy ==
Basu's alleged scientific misconduct has been noted widely and has even been covered in media. She is widely alleged to have duplicated images leading to retraction of two papers, correction of another two, and, many alleged instances of misconduct listed on Pubpeer. Basu has retracted a few of her papers. This includes an article published in The Journal of Immunology.

== Research work ==
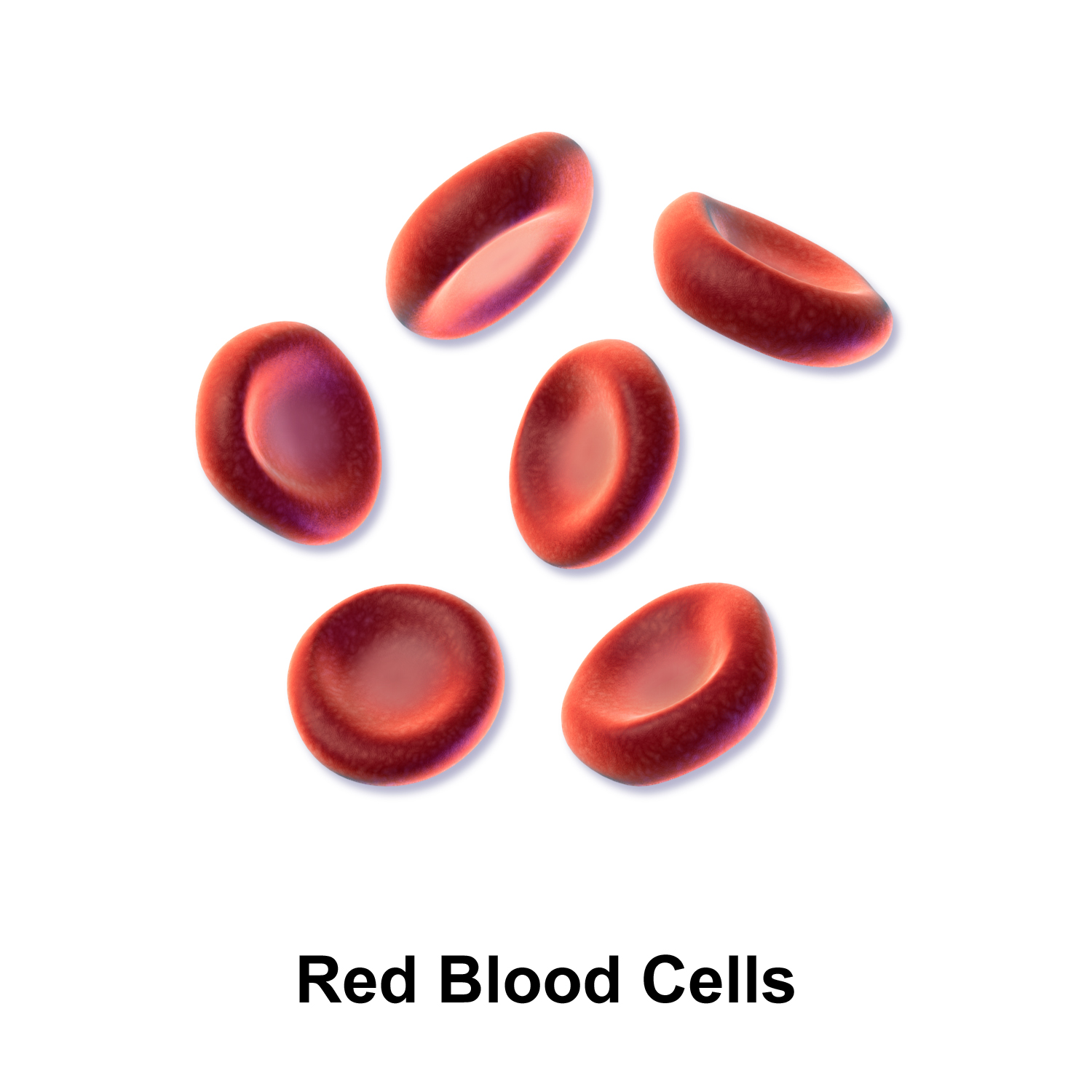
Red Blood Cells

Basu's research is focused on the cellular and molecular biology of mycobacteria. During the initial stages of her career, she worked on the membrane structure of red blood cells and her research is reported to have assisted in widening the understanding of apoptosis of nucleated mammalian cells and the physiology of the red cell that lacked a cell nucleus. Her association with her mentor, Parul Chakrabarti, during her doctoral research days, precipitated the studies of the biosynthetic pathways of fatty acids in relation to cell wall building and the functions of penicillin-binding proteins. She is known to be the first scientist to propose that the removal of the aged or oxidatively stressed red blood cells from the circulatory system causes cellular death. Later she moved on to the biological study of Mycobacterium tuberculosis, a pathogenic bacteria causing tuberculosis, with regard to its host-pathogen interaction and her studies revealed the mechanisms of macrophage apoptosis as well as the relationship between host cell signaling and innate immune response. In 2007, the team led by Basu and her college mate from the Presidency College, Manikuntala Kundu, were successful in identifying a protein in Mycobacterium tuberculosis which caused weakening of the immune system of the host. They found that the protein, named Early Secreted Antigen 6, which bound themselves on Toll-like receptor 2 of the host, hindered the production of cytokines, a type of protein which helped the immune system to fight the tuberculosis bacteria. The discovery also has reported importance in the therapeutics of diseases like rheumatoid arthritis. The achievement was later published as an article, Direct extracellular interaction between the early secreted antigen ESAT-6 of Mycobacterium tuberculosis and TLR2 inhibits TLR signaling in macrophages in Nature Immunology journal in 2007. Her studies have been documented by way of a number of articles (Note: Please see Selected bibliography section) and ResearchGate, an online repository of scientific articles has listed 77 of them. Besides, she has mentored several research scholars in their doctoral studies.

Basu is a member of the executive committee of the Indian Society of Cell Biology and is a former treasurer of the society. She is credited with contributing to the establishment of a program on Systems Biology at the Bose Institute. She is also a former associate editor of the Journal of Immunology and is an academic editor of PLOS One.

Basu retired in June 2018. Basu resides on Madhab Chatterjee Street in Kolkata.

== Awards and honors ==
Basu received the Young Scientist Medal of the Indian National Science Academy in 1989. The Department of Biotechnology of the Government of India awarded her the National Bioscience Award for Career Development, one of the highest Indian science awards in 2002. The National Academy of Sciences, India elected her as a fellow the same year. She received the elected fellowships of the Indian Academy of Sciences and the Indian National Academy of Sciences in 2006 and 2009 respectively. She is a recipient of the J.C. Bose National Fellowship in 2017.

== Selected bibliography ==
- Kumawat, Kuldeep; Pathak, Sushil Kumar; Spetz, Anna-Lena; Kundu, Manikuntala; Basu, Joyoti (April 2010). "Exogenous Nef Is an Inhibitor of Mycobacterium tuberculosis-induced Tumor Necrosis Factor-α Production and Macrophage Apoptosis". Journal of Biological Chemistry. 285 (17): 12629–12637. doi:10.1074/jbc.m109.073320. PMC 4705387. PMID 20068037.
- Sureka, Kamakshi; Sanyal, Sourav; Basu, Joyoti; Kundu, Manikuntala (December 2009). "Polyphosphate kinase 2: a modulator of nucleoside diphosphate kinase activity in mycobacteria". Molecular Microbiology. 74 (5): 1187–1197. doi:10.1111/j.1365-2958.2009.06925.x. PMID 19843229.
- Basu, Sanchita; Pathak, Shresh; Pathak, Sushil Kumar; Bhattacharyya, Asima; Banerjee, Anirban; Kundu, Manikuntala; Basu, Joyoti (December 2007). "Mycobacterium avium-induced matrix metalloproteinase-9 expression occurs in a cyclooxygenase-2-dependent manner and involves phosphorylation- and acetylation-dependent chromatin modification: Mycobacterium avium-induced MMP-9 expression". Cellular Microbiology. 9 (12): 2804–2816. doi:10.1111/j.1462-5822.2007.00997.x. PMID 17590163.

== See also ==
- ESAT-6
- Host–pathogen interaction
