= Frank Sargent (scientist) =

Professor of Microbial Biotechnology

Frank Sargent FRSE
- Born: 4 July 1970; Kirkcaldy, Scotland
- Education: University of Edinburgh (BSc), University of Dundee (PhD)
- Spouse: Tracy Palmer (m. 2000)
- Awards: Royal Society University Research Fellowship (2000)
- Scientific career
- Fields: Microbiology; Biochemistry; Molecular biology
- Institutions: Newcastle University; University of Dundee; University of East Anglia; John Innes Centre
- Thesis: Biosynthesis and processing of the nickel-containing hydrogenases of E. coli. (1996)
- Doctoral advisor: David H. Boxer

Frank Sargent is Professor of Microbial Biotechnology at Newcastle University, UK. He has specialised in bacterial bioenergetics, particularly protein transport and enzymes containing nickel and molybdenum, including biotechnology applications.

== Personal life ==
Sargent spent his childhood at Glenrothes in Fife, Scotland. The surname 'Sargent' is an anglicized version of the Italian Sargenti/Sorgenti/Sorgente, which was modified during the second world war in an attempt to avoid internment. The Sargenti family originate from Francesco Sorgente and Concetta Riccitiello Sorgenti who settled in Trenton, New Jersey in the early 20th century.

== Education ==
Sargent studied at University of Edinburgh, obtaining a B. Sc. degree specialising in biochemistry in 1992. He gained a PhD at University of Dundee in 1996.

== Career ==
He was at the John Innes Centre and then University of East Anglia from 1996 - 2007, latterly as a Royal Society University Research Fellow. In 2007 he was given a Personal Chair in Bacterial Physiology at University of Dundee and in 2018 he moved to Newcastle University as Professor of Microbial Biotechnology. In 2019 he was appointed as Associate Dean (Research & Innovation) in the Faculty of Science, Agriculture and Engineering (SAgE), and in 2022 he was appointed Deputy Dean of the University's Biosciences Institute in the Faculty of Medical Sciences (FMS). In September 2024 Sargent was appointed Dean of the Biosciences Institute at Newcastle University.

Sargent was Honorary Treasurer of The Biochemical Society from January 2018-December 2025. He is currently Deputy Chair of BBSRC Committee E (Fellowships).

Sargent became interested in bacterial bioenergetics as an undergraduate student and this developed into investigating how proteins were targeted in bacteria. While at University of East Anglia he led a team that mainly studied the biochemistry of bacterial Tat proofreading chaperones. These are small proteins that recognise and bind tightly to twin-arginine signal peptides. He returned to work on bacterial bioenergetics, specifically nickel-dependent hydrogenases and molybdenum-containing enzymes, when he returned to University of Dundee. This type of enzyme is involved in handling carbon dioxide in bacteria to convert it into formic acid that can be used in industry or for carbon transport and storage.

== Awards and honours ==
In 2006 he was awarded the Microbiology Society Fleming Prize Lecture for his work on the biosynthesis of complex enzymes.

In 2007 he was awarded the Colworth Medal by the Biochemical Society.

In 2009 he was awarded a Young Scientist Prize by the Federation of European Biochemical Societies.

In 2011 he was elected a Fellow of the Royal Society of Edinburgh for his contributions to bacterial membrane biology and energy metabolism.
