= Rhs toxins =

Rhs toxins belong to the polymorphic toxin category of bacterial exotoxins. Rhs proteins are widespread and can be produced by both Gram-negative and Gram-positive bacteria. Rhs toxins are very large proteins of usually more than 1,500 aminoacids with variable C-terminal toxic domains. Their toxic activity can either target eukaryotes or other bacteria.

== Domain architecture ==
In their large N-terminal region, Rhs toxins comprise RHS/YD repeats in various number (PF05593) (RHS meaning Rearrangement Hot Spot) and another "RHS-repeats associated core" domain (PF03527). In contrast, their C-terminal regions are shorter and harbor highly variable C-terminal domains including many domains with a predicted nuclease activity.

== Function ==
=== Anti-eukaryotic activity ===
These toxins encompass Rhs toxins of insect pathogens with an activity against insects. This group also include Rhs toxins with an activity against human phagocytic cells that contribute to pathogenesis of Pseudomonas aeruginosa.

=== Anti-bacterial activity ===
A role in inter-bacterial competition has been demonstrated for the plant pathogen Dickeya dadantii and for the human pathogen Escherichia coli.

When a polymorphic toxin with anti-bacterial activity is produced by a bacterial strain, this strain is protected by a specific immunity protein encoded by a gene immediately downstream of the toxin gene.

== Delivery ==
Some Rhs toxins such as the previously mentioned system in Dickeya dadantii appear to be dependent on the type VI secretion system for delivery into neighbouring cells. PAAR domain toxins such as Rhs appear to form the sharp tip of the type VI secretion system being attached to the VgrG of the secretion apparatus. The C-terminal toxins of Rhs may vary to diversify the antimicrobial activity of the type VI secretion system.
