= John Mekalanos =

John Mekalanos is a microbiologist who is primarily known for leading one of the first teams that reported the discovery of the type VI secretion system as well as his work on the pathogenicity of the bacterial species Vibrio cholerae, its toxin, and its secretion systems. Since 1998, he has been a member of the National Academy of Sciences.

== Education ==
He started his research studies as a graduate student in the labs of R. John Collier and William Robert Romig at UCLA where his research was focused on studying the genetic and biochemical analysis of the cholera toxin secreted by the bacterium Vibrio cholerae. Highlights of his career during this time was, along with Romig, the development of a screening assay designed to isolate the tox mutants of Vibrio cholerae (strains with altered toxin production ability) which led to the genetic mapping of the toxin-regulatory mutants in this bacterial species.

He continued his work on cholera toxin as a post-doc at the Department of Microbiology and Molecular Genetics at Harvard Medical School with John R. Murphy, which was followed by his appointment as an assistant professor there.

== Career and Research ==
=== Early Research ===
His early work as an independent researcher led to the identification of toxR, a gene that affects the expression of the cholera toxin operon ctxAB, the discovery that the Staphylococcus aureus enterotoxin A (entA) is a phage-encoded protein, and finally, the demonstration of the presence of duplications of the toxin operon in different strains of Vibrio cholerae that could account for the variable toxinogenicity of the strains which led to his promotion to Professor in 1986. His continued strong research output led to his appointment as Chairman of the then Department of Microbiology and Molecular Genetics (now Microbiology) ten years later in 1996 and his election to the National Academy of Sciences in 1998.

=== T6SS Discovery ===
In 2006, his group published the first account of the identification of a novel secretion system that they named the type VI secretion system, a system initially found to be capable of conferring increased virulence in non-O1/non-O139 strains of V. cholerae, which was later however shown to be primarily responsible for interbacterial competition.

== Awards and honors ==
- Eli Lilly and Company-Elanco Research Award (1991)
- AAAS Newcomb Cleveland Prize (1993)
- Elected to the National Academy of Sciences (1998)
- Elected to the American Academy of Microbiology (1999)
