= Translocation =

Translocation may refer to:

- Chromosomal translocation, a chromosome abnormality caused by rearrangement of parts
  - Robertsonian translocation, a chromosomal rearrangement in pairs 13, 14, 15, 21, and 22
  - Nonreciprocal translocation, transfer of genes from one chromosome to another
- PEP group translocation, a method used by bacteria for sugar uptake
- Twin-arginine translocation pathway, a protein export pathway found in plants, bacteria, and archaea
- Translocation (botany), transport of nutrients through phloem
- Protein translocation, also called protein targeting, a process in protein biosynthesis
- Species translocation, movement of a species, by people, from one area to another
- Translocation (pedology), movement of soil from one place to another within the soil profile
