= Sarah Coulthurst =

British molecular bacteriologist

Sarah J. Coulthurst
- Education: University of Cambridge
- Scientific career
- Workplaces: University of Dundee
- Doctoral advisor: George P. C. Salmond

Sarah Coulthurst a molecular bacteriologist and Professor of Microbial Interactions at the University of Dundee, UK. Her research focuses increasing understanding of how bacteria can cause disease, and how this information can eventually lead to new medical treatments.

== Education ==
Sarah J. Coulthurst gained an integrated four year Natural Sciences master's degree, specialising in biochemistry, from the University of Cambridge, UK. Her Master's project, working with Peter F. Leadlay, was on polyketide syntheses, enzymes that are involved in the synthesis of many antibiotics and other natural products. This experience changed her plans from intending to take up medicine to follow a research career in microbiology that would allow her to have an impact on human health. She decided to take a PhD and studied bacterial communication through the phenomenon of quorum sensing with George P. C. Salmond.

== Career ==
Coulthurst's research uses the bacterial species Serratia marcescens to study competition and co-operation among bacterial species. Her research focuses on type VI secretion systems for injection of proteins into other bacteria, frequently toxic proteins in antagonistic interactions. Her research group has shown that some bacteria can also use this system against fungal competitors. This secretion system involves a large contractile protein nanostructure, and bacteria may have immunity proteins to protect themselves against their own toxic proteins.

After gaining her doctorate, she stayed with Salmond's group as a post-doctoral fellow and then moved to University of Dundee to work with Frank Sargent on bacterial protein movement. Then in around 2009, with funding from the Royal Society of Edinburgh and a Scottish Government Personal Research Fellowship, she formed her own research group at Dundee into the type VI secretion system of Gram-negative bacteria. She was promoted to a personal chair in January 2021.

== Awards ==
From 2011 to 2016 Coulthurst was a member of the Royal Society of Edinburgh Young Academy. In 2015 she was awarded the World Cultural Council Special Recognition Diploma and also a Wellcome Trust Senior Research Fellowship, renewed in 2020. In 2018 Coulthurst was awarded the Fleming Prize by the Microbiology Society for her work with the type VI secretion system of bacteria within 12 years of the award of her doctorate and also the Society for Applied Microbiology W. H. Pierce Prize and the Royal Society of Edinburgh Patrick Neill Medal. She was elected a Fellow of the Royal Society of Edinburgh in 2024.

== Publications ==
Coulthurst is the author or co-author of over 70 scientific publications. These include:

- FR Cianfanelli, L Monlezun, SJ Coulthurst (2016) Aim, load, fire: the type VI secretion system, a bacterial nanoweapon. Trends in Microbiology 24 51-62
- Hui Liu, Sarah J. Coulthurst, Leighton Pritchard, Peter E. Hedley, Michael Ravensdale, Sonia Humphris, Tom Burr, Gunnhild Takle, May-Bente Brurberg, Paul R. J. Birch, George P. C. Salmond, Ian K. Toth (2008) Quorum sensing coordinates brute force and stealth modes of infection in the plant pathogen Pectobacterium atrosepticum. PLoS Pathogens 4 (6) e1000093
- Sarah J. Coulthurst, Anne M. L. Barnard & George P. C. Salmond (2005) Regulation and biosynthesis of carbapenem antibiotics in bacteria. Nature Reviews Microbiology 3 295–306
- Sarah J Coulthurst, Neil A Whitehead, Martin Welch, George P.C Salmond (2002) Can boron get bacteria talking? Trends in Biochemical Sciences 27 (5) 217-219

== Personal life ==
Coulthurst has two children.
