= Contact-dependent growth inhibition =

Contact-dependent growth inhibition (CDI) is a phenomenon where a bacterial cell may deliver a polymorphic toxin molecule into neighbouring bacterial cells upon direct cell-cell contact, causing growth arrest or cell death.

== Discovery ==
CDI is now a blanket term to describe interbacterial competition that relies on direct cell-cell contact in bacteria. However, the phenomenon was first discovered in 2005 in the isolate EC93 of Escherichia coli found in rat intestine, and, in this case, was mediated by a Type V secretion system. This isolate dominated the rat's gut flora and appeared to be particularly good at outcompeting lab strains of E. coli when grown in co-culture. The novel part of this discovery was that the inhibitory effects of the isolated E. coli appeared to require direct cell-cell contact. Before CDI was discovered in this isolate, the only systems known to mediate direct interbacterial competition by intoxication were toxins secreted into the extracellular space. Thus, these did not require cell-cell contact. A second system that could mediate CDI was discovered in 2006 in the pathogenic bacterium Vibrio cholerae, the cause of the gastro-intestinal disease cholera, and the opportunistic pathogen Pseudomonas aerugenosa. This system was much different that the Type V secretion system identified in E. coli, and thus formed a new class of CDI: the Type VI Secretion System.

== Types of CDI ==
=== Type IV ===
The Type IV Secretion System T4SS is found in many species of Gram-negative and Gram-positive bacteria as well as in archea and are typically associated with conjugation or delivery of virulence proteins to eukaryotic cells. Some species of plant pathogen Xanthomonas, however, possess a particular T4SS capable of mediating CDI by delivering a peptidoglycan hydrolase. This effector kills targets that do not have the cognate immunity protein similar to other CDI systems.

=== Type V ===
The first CDI system to be discovered was a Type V secretion system, encoded by the cdiBAI gene cluster found widespread throughout pathogenic Gram-negative bacteria. The first protein encoded in the operon, CdiB, is an outer membrane beta-barrel protein that exports CdiA, presenting it on the cell surface of a CDI-expressing (CDI+) bacterium. CdiA is predicted to form a filament several nanometers long that extends outward from the CDI+ cell in order to interact with neighbouring bacteria via outer membrane protein receptors to which it will bind. The C-terminal 200-300 amino acids of CdiA harbours a highly variable toxic domain (CdiA-CT), which is delivered into a neighbouring bacterium upon receptor recognition, enabling the CDI+ cell to arrest the growth of the cell into which it delivers this CdiA-CT toxin. This toxic domain is linked to the rest of CdiA via a VENN peptide motif and vary significantly more between species than does the rest of CdiA. CdiI is an immunity protein to prevent auto-inhibition by the C-terminal toxin. This also prevents the bacteria from killing or inhibiting the growth of their siblings as long as these possess the immunity gene. Many CDI systems contain additional cdiA-CT/cdiI pairs called "orphans" following the first copy and these orphans can be connected to different main CdiA:s in a modular fashion.

=== Type VI ===
The Type VI Secretion System T6SS is widely spread amongst Gram-negative bacteria and consists of a protein complex with 13 core components (TssA to TssM), forming a needle-like structure capable of injecting effector molecules into neighbouring target cells similar to the contractile tail of the T4 bacteriophage. The T6SS is capable of delivering effectors to both prokaryote and eukaryotes target cells. Upon contraction of the T6SS, effectors are transported across the cytosol of the bacteria cell into the target cells. Effectors are loaded onto this dynamic secretion system through interactions with Hcp, VgrG and PAAR-domains. The full list of T6SS effectors is not known.

==== Rhs toxins ====
The Rearrangement hotspot system (Rhs) exists in both Gram-negative and Gram-positive bacteria. Similar to CdiA, these systems consists of big proteins with a conserved N-terminal domain and a variable C-terminal toxin domain requiring a cognate immunity protein. Many Rhs systems contain PAAR-domains (Proline-Alanine-Alanine-Arginine) which can interact with the VgrG of the T6SS apparatus making it required for Rhs secretion. The name Rearrangement hotspots comes from the discovery when the system was first identified as elements on the E. coli chromosome that were continuously rearranging. The Gram-positive soil bacterium Bacillus subtilis possesses an Rhs homolog called Wall-associated protein A (WapA) capable of mediating CDI whilst requiring a cognate immunity protein, WapI, to prevent auto-inhibition.

== Other functions ==
=== Cell aggregation and biofilm formation ===
In E. coli, CdiA molecules may interact with those found on neighboring cells, independent of the receptor to which CdiA binds. In addition with receptor binding, these homotypic interactions cause cell-cell aggregation and promote biofilm formation for CDI+ bacteria. In a similar fashion, the CdiA homolog BcpA in Burkholderia thailandensis causes up-regulation of genes encoding pili and polysaccharides when delivered to sibling cells which are in possession of the immunity protein BcpI. This change in gene expression leads to increased biofilm formation in the bacterial population through a phenomenon now known as Contact-Dependent Signalling. Furthermore, the T6SS in V. cholerae is active in biofilms, enabling a cell expressing T6SS to kill nearby cells which do not have the specific immunity. The release of DNA from target cell death can be beneficial for gene transfer as well as the release of extra cellular DNA into the matrix.

=== Antibiotic persistence ===
In E. coli, CdiA-CT toxins have been found to induce persister cell formation in a clonal population when delivered to cells that lack sufficient levels of CdiI immunity to neutralise the incoming toxins. The intoxication of the cells leads to an increase of cellular (p)ppGpp levels, which in turn leads to degradation of the immunity protein and eventually to a higher extend of intoxication, resulting in persister formation.
