= MafB toxins =

Exotoxin

MafB toxins are exotoxins secreted by pathogenic Neisseria species (including meningococcus and gonococcus).

MafB toxins belong to the category of polymorphic toxins. The N-terminal region of MafB proteins harbors a domain of unknown function named DUF1020 while the C-terminal region is variable and harbors a toxic domain. MafB toxins are involved in interbacterial competition.
