= Nicola Stanley-Wall =

Professor of Molecular Microbiology

- Education: University of East Anglia
- Known for: Biofilms
- Scientific career
- Workplaces: University of Dundee
- Doctoral advisor: Prof. Tracy Palmer

Nicola Stanley-Wall FRSE FRSB is a Professor of Microbiology in the School of Life Sciences at the University of Dundee who works on the molecular mechanism of biofilm formation. Her laboratory investigates how bacteria come together to form social communities called biofilms. More specifically, her research analyses the way the molecules in the biofilm matrix provide support and protection to biofilms formed by the Gram-positive bacterium Bacillus subtilis.

In 2012, she was elected a Fellow of the Royal Society of Biology. In 2018, she was elected a Fellow of the Royal Society of Edinburgh.

She is an advocate for public engagement in science and has taken part in national and international events. Stanley-Wall was awarded the Royal Society of Edinburgh's Beltane Prize for Public Engagement in 2012 and became Academic Lead for Public Engagement for the School. In this role she led in the process that resulted in the School of Life Sciences at the University of Dundee, being the first faculty in the country to be awarded a Gold Engage Watermark by the National Co-ordinating Centre for Public Engagement. In 2018, the University of Dundee's School of Life Sciences hosted the Magnificent Microbes! event with the Dundee Science Centre. She is a member of the Young Academy of Scotland where she is part of the Excellence in Education group.

As part of her interest in science communication, she and her colleague Kelsey McOwat created the 'Blast a Biofilm' board game to raise awareness and knowledge of biofilms in young learners. Due to the increasing risk of antibiotic resistance and correlating decrease in effective clinical treatments, this work has a clear pathway to impact. In addition, the Stanley-Wall lab has worked with a scientific animation company, Vivomotion, to make an animation that explains what biofilms are and how they impact people's everyday lives.

About her work, she states, "I love my job as it involves original thinking, scientific enquiry, and versatility: skills that I have enjoyed developing over the course of my career."

In 2015, she was part of a team including Cait MacPhee that aimed to develop ice cream that does not melt.

In 2019, Dr Stanley-Wall was one of the female scientists celebrated by the Royal Society of Edinburgh in its photo exhibition at the entrance of the RSE building.

== Education ==
Stanley-Wall received her PhD from the University of East Anglia in 2000, working with Prof. Tracy Palmer in the Nitrogen Fixation Laboratory at the John Innes Centre. She was an EMBO (European Molecular Biology Organisation) Long term fellow at the University of California at Los Angeles (2001-2005).

== Current projects ==
Between 2017-2022 she is the principal investigator on the BBSRC funded project 'Architecture of a Biofilm' which aims to build and subsequently utilise artificial biofilms.

From 2017-2022 she is a co-investigator on the IKC biofilms project, the National Biofilms Innovation Centre (NBIC): this is a collaborative endeavour with The University of Edinburgh and The University of Southampton. For this project, NBIC is working across four strategic themes to prevent, detect, manage and engineer biofilms, using world-class underpinning research to address sectoral challenges identified with industry partners.

== Awards ==
- Fellow of the Royal Society of Edinburgh (2018)
- Fellow of the European Academy of Microbiologists (2018)
- Teaching Award for Good Practice (Highly Commended) (2016)
- Wain Medal (2016)
- The Brian Cox Award for Public Engagement (2014)
- Fellow of the Society of Biology (2012)
- Royal Society of Edinburgh Patrick Neil Medal (2012)
- Royal Society of Edinburgh Beltane Prize for Public Engagement (2012)
- Royal Society of Edinburgh, Young Academy (2011)
- The Brian Cox Award for Public Engagement: Senior Researcher (2010)
- Fellow of the Royal Society of Edinburgh Young Academy (2010)
- The Fleming Award Medal of the Society for General Microbiology (2009)

In 2005 she was awarded a BBSRC David Phillips Fellowship for her work on environmental regulators and the genes required for biofilm formation by Bacillus subtilis.
