= CFP-10 =

Protein made by Mycobacterium tuberculosis

10 kDa culture filtrate antigen CFP-10
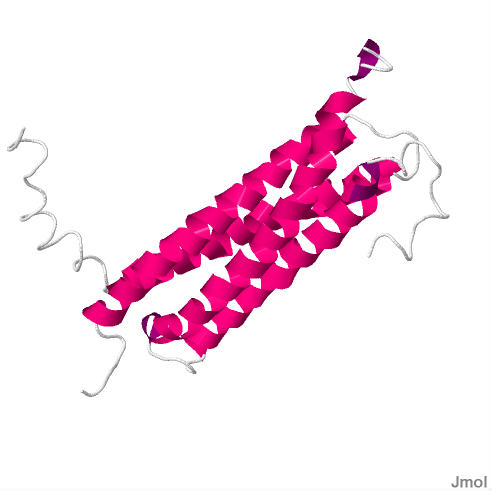
- Structure of the CFP10-ESAT6 complex from M. tuberculosis.

Identifiers
- Organism: Mycobacterium tuberculosis
- Symbol: esxB
- Entrez: 886194
- Orthologs: NCBI: entry; OMA: entry
- PDB: 3FAV
- RefSeq (Prot): NP_218391
- UniProt: P0A566

Other data
- Chromosome: genome: 4.35 - 4.35 Mb
Search for
- Structures: Swiss-model
- Domains: InterPro

CFP-10 within bacterial proteins (also known as ESAT-6-like protein esxB or secreted antigenic protein MTSA-10 or 10 kDa culture filtrate antigen CFP-10) is a protein that is encoded by the esxB gene.

CFP-10 is a 10 kDa secreted antigen from Mycobacterium tuberculosis. It forms a 1:1 heterodimeric complex with ESAT-6. Both genes are expressed from the RD1 region of the bacterial genome and play a key role in the virulence of the infection.

== Function ==
10-kDa culture filtrate protein (CFP-10) is an antigen that contributes to the virulence of Mycobacterium tuberculosis. CFP-10 forms a tight 1:1 heterodimeric complex with 6-kDa early secreted antigen target (ESAT-6). In the mycobacterial cell, these two proteins are interdependent for their stability. The ESAT-6/CFP-10 complex is secreted by the ESX-1 secretion system, also known as the RD1 region. Mycobacterium tuberculosis uses this ESX-1 secretion system to deliver virulence factors into host macrophage and monocyte white blood cells during infection.

In Mycobacterium tuberculosis, the ESX-1 secretion system, a type VII bacterial secretion system, includes Rv3877 and two AAA ATPases, Rv3870 and Rv3871, the latter a cytosolic protein, as subunits. The ESAT-6/CFP-10 heterodimer complex is targeted for secretion by a C-terminal signal sequence on CFP-10 that is recognized by the cytosolic Rv3871 protein. Rv3871 then interacts with the CFP-10 C-terminal, and escorts the ESAT-6/CFP-10 complex to Rv3870 and Rv3877, a multi-transmembrane protein which may make up a pore that spans the inner membrane of the bacterium. Once ESAT-6/CFP-10 is next to the membrane of the host cell, the CFP-10 C-terminal attaches and binds itself to the cell surface. The ESAT-6/CFP-10 complex’s secretion and attachment to the host cell shows its contribution to the pathogenicity of Mycobacterium tuberculosis.

== See also ==
- QuantiFERON
- ESAT-6
