= Britt Koskella =

US academic evolutionary biologist

- Education: Indiana University, Bloomington, USA
- Children: 2
- Scientific career
- Fields: Evolution; microbiomes
- Workplaces: University of Exeter, UK; University of California, Berkeley, USA
- Thesis: (2008)
- Doctoral advisor: Curtis Lively

Britt Koskella is an associate professor at the University of California, Berkeley, USA. She studies evolutionary biology, specialising in host-pathogen relationships.

== Education ==
Britt Koskella was an undergraduate at University of Virginia, initially studying psychology. Part-time work as a technician with the research group of Janis Antonovics, where she saw experimental evolution laboratory studies of the movement of a plant pathogen between species, changed the direction of her degree and became the foundation of her research interests. She was awarded the degree of Ph.D. by the Indiana University Bloomington in 2008 for research on the role of parasites in host sexual reproduction and diversity, supervised by Curtis Lively. This involved the New Zealand mud snail and its trematode parasite.

== Career ==
Her research makes use of bacteriophage-bacteria-plant systems to investigate host-pathogen co-evolution. It involves both field, molecular and laboratory experiments.

After gaining her doctorate she held a fellowship until 2011 to collaborate with Angus Buckling at University of Oxford, UK and John Thompson at University of California, Santa Cruz in studies of the interactions between plants, bacteria and bacteriophage. She then held further fellowships at the University of Exeter from 2011 until 2015. In 2015 she was appointed to a post as associate professor at the University of California, Berkeley.

In 2021 she was awarded the Fleming Prize Lecture by the Microbiology Society.

== Publications ==
Koskella is the author or co-author of over 70 scientific publications and book chapters. These include:

- Britt Koskella, Lindsay J. Hall and C. Jessica E. Metcalf (2017) The microbiome beyond the horizon of ecological and evolutionary theory. Nature Ecology & Evolution 1 1606–1615
- B. Koskella (2013) Phage-mediated selection on microbiota of a long-lived host. Curr Biol 23 1256–1260.
- B. Koskella, and C.M. Lively. (2009) Evidence for negative frequency-dependent selection during experimental coevolution of a freshwater snail and a sterilizing trematode. Evolution 63 2213-2221

== Personal life ==
Koskella is married. The couple has two children.
