= Tony Carr (scientist) =

Scottish biologist (born 1960)

Antony Michael Carr (born 2 May 1960) is an emeritus professor and director of the Genome Damage and Stability Centre (GDSC) at the University of Sussex.

Carr was born in Dunfermline, Scotland and educated at Helston Comprehensive School. He graduated from the University of East Anglia with a BSc in biological sciences in 1981, and subsequently became a doctoral student in the laboratory of Paul Nurse at the University of Sussex, where he completed his PhD in 1987.

In 1996, he was awarded the Fleming Prize Lecture by the Microbiology Society. He was elected a Fellow of the Academy of Medical Sciences in 2014.
