= Stocksbridge High School =

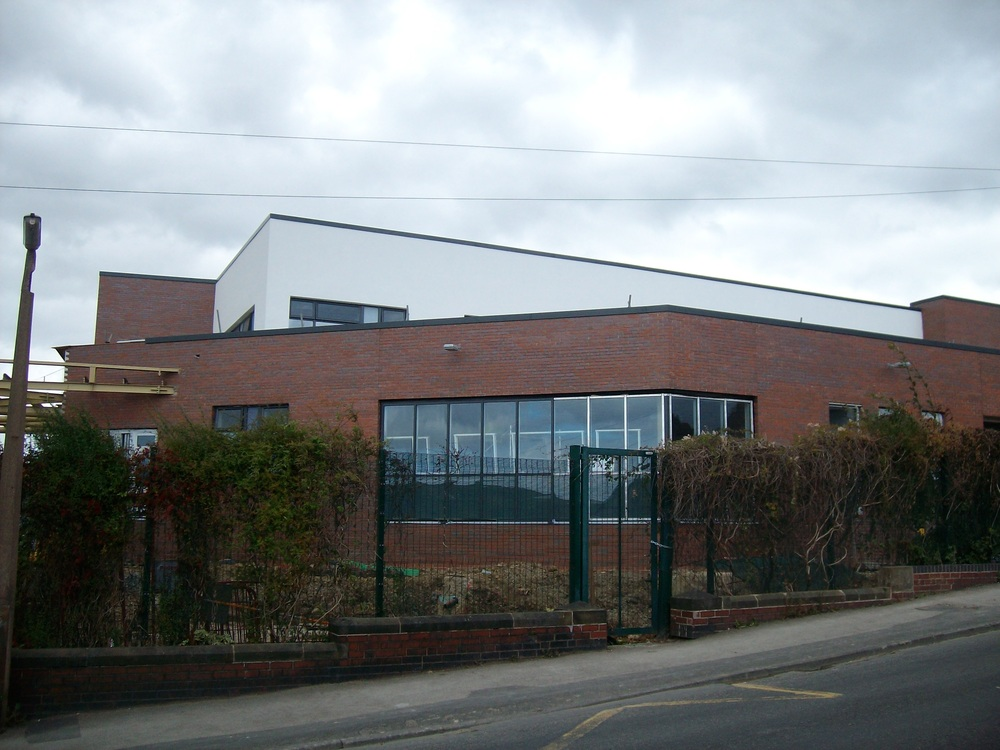
- New block at Stockbridge High School

Location
- Shay House Lane; Stocksbridge, South Yorkshire, S36 1FD; England; 53.4781°N 1.5963°W

Information
- Type: Academy
- Motto: Believe, Achieve, Succeed
- Established: 1927
- Local authority: Sheffield City Council
- Department for Education URN: 145274 Tables
- Ofsted: Reports
- Head teacher: Dave Williams
- Gender: Mixed
- Age: 11 to 16
- Enrolment: 837
- Colours: Burgundy and Grey
- Website: www.stocksbridgehigh.co.uk

Stocksbridge High School is a mixed secondary school for 11 to 16-year-olds, in the town of Stocksbridge, South Yorkshire, England. In December 2017 the school gained Academy school status joining Minerva Learning Trust.

== History ==
The first school established in Stocksbridge was a small single storey building constructed by a company of Independent Worshippers' on the site of the present NatWest bank in Stocksbridge. The school was named 'Ebeneezer' and was used as both a day school and a chapel. In 1927 Stocksbridge School was constructed on Shay House Lane and Ralph Ellis became the first headmaster. Between 1939 and 1945 the school played an active part in the war effort, and in March 1941 they raised a total of 91 pounds, 17 shillings and 8 pence as part of a 'War Weapons Week.' Two air raid shelters were also constructed, one on the site of the old car park and another on the site of the old sports hall. In 1971 the school became a comprehensive and was renamed to Stocksbridge High School.

== Today ==
Stocksbridge High School consists of two blocks, north and south. The south block is a modern construction completed in 2014 and the north completely refurbished. At the same time of constructing a new block a sports hall was added to the site which also contains a dance studio.

The school serves the local communities of Stocksbridge and Deepcar, but also has a tradition of children attending from the High Green and Chapeltown areas of the city; a bus service supports the attendance of these out of catchment pupils'.

== Academic performance ==
The school was inspected in May 2022 by Ofsted, which gave a rating of Grade II 'Good' in all areas. This followed a trend of improvement in all performance measures since 2017. Up until this point the school had been rated as "requires improvement" since 2014.

== Curriculum ==
The school follows the National Curriculum and offers the GCSE and vocational qualifications. The core subjects are English language and literature, mathematics and science, other subjects being art, music, sports, French, Spanish, design and technology, and "other cultural pursuits" and civic responsibility.

== Notable former pupils ==
- Matt Helders, musician in the Arctic Monkeys
- Tracy Palmer, microbiologist
- Alex Turner, musician in the Arctic Monkeys
- Oli Sykes, musician in Bring Me The Horizon
- Lee Malia, musician in Bring Me The Horizon
