= Cait MacPhee =

Professor of Biological Physics

- Education: University of Melbourne
- Known for: Biological Physics
- Scientific career
- Workplaces: University of Edinburgh

Catherine Elizabeth "Cait" MacPhee CBE FRSE FInstP FRSC is a Professor of Biological Physics at the University of Edinburgh. MacPhee's research into the BslA protein from Bacillus subtilis, together with Nicola Stanley-Wall from the School of Life Sciences, University of Dundee, has been widely reported because of potential applications in the production of ice cream. She was appointed CBE "for services to women in physics", and was subsequently elected as a fellow of the Royal Society of Edinburgh. She was a finalist for the BBSRC Innovator of the Year competition, and was awarded the Gabor Medal of the Royal Society.

== Education ==
Catherine Elizabeth, known as Cait, MacPhee is Professor of Biological Physics at the University of Edinburgh. She studied for her BSc in biochemistry and her PhD in medicine at the University of Melbourne. She comes from a family of scientists, but had initially wanted to be a professional musician. McPhee said that she initially trained in biochemistry and immunology, "but I moved across to physics when biology became just too complicated".

== Career ==
McPhee moved to the University of Oxford for postdoctoral research, where she was a research fellow at St Hilda's College, and subsequently held a Royal Society Dorothy Hodgkin Fellowship. From 2001–2005 she was a Royal Society University Fellow in the Cavendish Laboratory of the University of Cambridge and held a research fellowship at Girton College and then a fellowship at King's College. In 2006 she moved to the University of Edinburgh, where she became Professor of Biological Physics in 2011.

MacPhee's research into the BslA protein from Bacillus subtilis, together with Nicola Stanley-Wall from the School of Life Sciences, University of Dundee, has been widely reported because of potential applications in the production of ice cream. She was appointed CBE in the 2016 New Year Honours "for services to women in physics", and was subsequently elected as a fellow of the Royal Society of Edinburgh. In 2016 she was selected as a finalist for the BBSRC Innovator of the Year competition. In 2018 she was awarded the Gabor Medal of the Royal Society.
