= Tracy Palmer =

Professor of molecular microbiology (born 1967)

Tracy Palmer FRS FRSE FMedSci
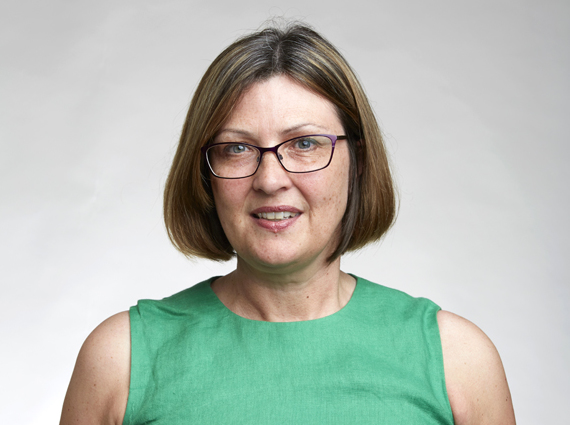
- Tracy Palmer at the Royal Society admissions day in London, July 2018
- Born: 8 May 1967; Sheffield, England
- Education: University of Birmingham (BSc, PhD)
- Spouses: Michael St John (m. 1993; div. 2000); Frank Sargent (m. 2000)
- Children: James Sargent (b. 2000), Jack Sargent (b. 2002)
- Awards: EMBO Member (2017); Royal Society University Research Fellowship (1996)
- Scientific career
- Fields: Microbiology; Biochemistry; Molecular biology
- Institutions: Newcastle University; University of Dundee; University of East Anglia; John Innes Centre
- Thesis: The kinetics of the proton-translocating transhydrogenase from photosynthetic bacteria (1992)
- Doctoral advisor: J. Baz Jackson

Tracy Palmer is a British microbiologist who is a professor of microbiology in the Biosciences Institute at Newcastle University in Tyne & Wear, England. She is known for her work on the twin-arginine translocation (Tat) pathway.

== Early life and education ==
Palmer was born in Sheffield on 8 May 1967, the only child of Enid (née Wilson 1939-2000) and Roy Palmer 1936-2023 (a steelworker). Palmer was brought up in the steel town of Stocksbridge in South Yorkshire where she attended Stocksbridge High School. Palmer attended the University of Birmingham where she was awarded a Bachelor of Science degree in biochemistry in 1988 followed by a PhD in 1992 for research investigating the enzyme kinetics of the proton pumping transhydrogenase from photosynthetic bacteria. She was inspired by the work of Peter D. Mitchell and his work on chemiosmosis during her PhD.

== Career and research ==
Palmer's main research interest is in the processes by which bacteria secrete proteins into their environment. She was one of the co-discoverers of the bacterial Tat protein secretion system. The Tat system is highly unusual because it transports folded proteins of variable sizes across biological membranes while at the same time maintaining the impermeability of the membrane to ions.

Palmer has initiated work on a second type of protein transporter– the Type VII secretion system (T7SS) in the human pathogen Staphylococcus aureus. Her group has demonstrated for the first time that the T7SS is involved in interbacterial competition by showing that the S. aureus T7SS secretes a large nuclease toxin, which inhibits the growth of closely related S. aureus strains.

Palmer's early career included a postdoctoral research position at the University of Dundee (1992-1993) where she was a member of Professor David H. Boxer's group in the Department of Biochemistry. At that time Palmer was studying 'Protein FA' - the factor d'association needed for the final step in molybdopterin guanine dinucleotide biosynthesis. Palmer purified the protein and identified it as the product of the mobA gene. From 1993 to 1996, Palmer was an independent University Research Fellow at the University of Dundee leading a study into the anaerobic metabolism of Rhodobacter sphaeroides. Indeed, the behaviour of the periplasmic DMSO reductase of Rh. sphaeroides and its E. coli homologue TMAO reductase laid the foundations for Palmer's future research on the Tat pathway.

In 1996, Palmer was awarded a Royal Society University Research Fellowship (URF), which was administered by the University of East Anglia in Norwich while Palmer's new research group was based in the Department of Molecular Microbiology at the John Innes Centre. In 2004, Palmer was awarded a MRC Senior Non-Clinical Research Fellowship and was promoted to a personal chair in molecular microbiology by the University of East Anglia. While in Norwich Palmer began a long collaboration with Professor Ben C. Berks FRS (now of the Department of Biochemistry at the University of Oxford). Together they were awarded the 2002 Microbiology Society Fleming Prize Lecture for characterisation of the bacterial twin-arginine protein targeting (Tat) system.

In 2007, Palmer was recruited back to the University of Dundee to take up a new position in the College of Life Sciences. Palmer was head of the Division of Molecular Microbiology at Dundee from 2009 to 2017, before leaving to join Newcastle University in 2018. She is now head of the research theme Microbes in Health & Disease, which is part of the Newcastle Biosciences Institute (NUBI) within the Faculty of Medical Sciences (FMS).

Palmer has served the microbiology community in multiple ways, including previously serving as Editor for Microbiology and Molecular Microbiology. She is currently Chair of a Research Appointments Panel at The Royal Society.

=== Awards and honours ===
Palmer was elected a Fellow of the Royal Society (FRS) in 2018 for "substantial contributions to the improvement of natural knowledge". She was elected a Fellow of the Royal Society of Edinburgh (FRSE) in 2009, is a Fellow of the American Academy of Microbiology and a member of the European Molecular Biology Organization (EMBO). She was awarded a Royal Society University Research Fellowship (URF) in 1996.

In 2021, Palmer was elected as a Fellow of the Academy of Medical Sciences.
