= Josiah Coulthurst =

English cricketer

Personal information
- Full name: Josiah Coulthurst
- Born: 24 December 1893; Blackburn, Lancashire
- Died: 6 January 1970 (aged 76); Lytham St Annes, Lancashire
- Batting: Left-handed
- Bowling: Left-arm fast-medium
- Role: Bowler

Domestic team information
- Years: Team
- 1919: Lancashire

Career statistics
Competition	First-class
Matches	1
Runs scored	-
Batting average	–
100s/50s	-/-
Top score	-
Balls bowled	-
Wickets	-
Bowling average	-
5 wickets in innings	-
10 wickets in match	-
Best bowling	-
Catches/stumpings	-/–

Josiah "Jos" Coulthurst (24 December 1893 – 6 January 1970) was an English cricketer. He was a left-arm medium-fast bowler who played first-class cricket for Lancashire. He was born in Blackburn and died in Lytham St Annes.

Coulthurst made just one first-class appearance for Lancashire, against Northamptonshire in 1919. However, as a tailend batsman, he was unable to bat or bowl during the game, the second day of which was rained off. (County Championship games in the 1919 season were played over only two days, as an experiment.)

Coulthurst played Minor Counties Championship cricket between 1921 and 1922, and played in the Lancashire League between 1919 and 1928, for East Lancashire, aiding the team to appearances in the Worsley Cup finals of 1921 and 1927.
