= Nickel-dependent hydrogenase =

Identifiers
- Symbol: NiFeSe_Hases
- Pfam: PF00374
- InterPro: IPR001501
- PROSITE: PDOC00400
- SCOP2: 1frv / SCOPe / SUPFAM
- TCDB: 3.D.7
Available protein structures:
- PDB: 1e3dD:50-543 1h2rL:59-552 1ubjL:59-552 1ublL:59-552 1wulL:59-552 1h2aL:59-552 1ubtL:59-552 1wujL:59-552 1ubuL:59-552 1ubkL:59-552 1ubhL:59-552 1ubmL:59-552 1wukL:59-552 1wuhL:59-552 1wuiL:59-552 1uboL:59-552 1ubrL:59-552 1frfL:50-549 1yqwQ:50-548 1yq9H:43-535 1cc1L:49-498 IPR001501 PF00374 (ECOD; PDBsum)
- AlphaFold: IPR001501; PF00374

Hydrogenases are enzymes that catalyze the reversible activation of hydrogen and which occur widely in prokaryotes as well as in some eukaryotes. There are various types of hydrogenases, but all of them seem to contain at least one iron-sulphur cluster. They can be broadly divided into two groups: hydrogenases containing nickel and, in some cases, also selenium (the [NiFe] and [NiFeSe] hydrogenases) and those lacking nickel (the [Fe] hydrogenases).

The [NiFe] and [NiFeSe] hydrogenases are heterodimer that consist of a small subunit that contains a signal peptide and a large subunit. All the known large subunits seem to be evolutionary related; they contain two Cys-x-x-Cys motifs; one at their N-terminal end; the other at their C-terminal end. These four cysteines are involved in the binding of nickel. In the [NiFeSe] hydrogenases the first cysteine of the C-terminal motif is a selenocysteine which has experimentally been shown to be a nickel ligand.
