= Cholera autoinducer-1 =

Signaling molecule in the bacterium Vibrio cholerae

Cholera autoinducer-1 (CAI-1) is an autoinducer signaling molecule present in the bacterium Vibrio cholerae, which causes cholera. CAI-1 is known structurally as an (S)-3-hydroxytridecan and is involved in the regulation of biofilm formation and quorum sensing. It also regulates expression of virulence factors.

== Discovery ==
V. cholerae, the bacterium that houses the CAI-1 chemokine, was discovered independently by two unrelated researchers: Filippo Pacini in 1854, and Robert Koch in 1883. CAI-1 has no recorded discovery date, but some of the earliest studies on autoinducers and the quorum-sensing nature of V. cholerae were conducted by the microbiology department of Harvard Medical school. Prior to the study of V. cholerae, researchers obtained data from a close relative bacterium, Vibrio harveyi.

== Chemical structure and properties ==
CAI-1 is identified as an (S)-3-hydroxytridecan and is produced by multiple Vibrio species, functioning as an intra-genus signal. CAI-1 works directly with AI-2, which is itself identified as a (2S,4S)-2-methyl-2,3,3,4-tetrahydroxytetrahydrofuran borate which aids in interspecies communication, quorum sensing, and biofilm formation. The two autoinducers are created by synthase CqsA and LuxS.

CAI-1 has a molecular weight of 214.34 g/mol, with the formula C_{13}H_{26}O_{2}. It is synthesized by CqsA, a pyridoxal phosphate dependent amintotransferase enzyme, but its role is not fully known. CqsA can be identified by substrates (S)-2-aminobutyrate and deconyl coenzyme A. CAI-1 synthesis relies on both the synthase CqsA and the sensor CqsS.

An abundance of autoinducer within the Vibrio genus can cause the formation of a protease that, when activated, leads to degradation of attachment sites. This allows the bacteria to be free from restraints (such as intestinal epithelial cells) and move to another area for growth.

== Role in quorum sensing ==
Quorum sensing is a form of cell communication that allows bacteria to interact with each other to share information and coordinate behaviors in response to their environments. It can be used as a global regulator to control pathogenicity and biofilm formation, determine population size, modulate virulence mechanisms, and track changes in the cell or gene expression. Quorum sensing uses production, release, accumulation, and detection of autoinducers to monitor population density, control virulence mechanisms, and to form biofilms.

Cholera autoinducer-1 (CAI-1) and autoinducer-2 (AI-2) are the two quorum sensing autoinducers used by V. cholerae, with CAI-1 being the major quorum-sensing autoinducer molecule that mediates system 1 in the V. cholerae quorum sensing system. CAI-1 and AI-2 transduce information into a cell using a phosphorylation-dephosphorylation cascade affecting target gene expression. In V. cholerae, CqsS detects CAI-1 and LuxS detects AI-2. Information from these two autoinducers is transduced through LuxO to maintain levels of HapR transcription factor. HapR represses genes for biofilm formation and production of virulence factors, the goal of quorum sensing at high cell densities. At lower cell densities, without autoinducers, HapR is not produced.

== Role in biofilm formation ==
CAI-1 plays a critical role in regulating biofilm formation in V. cholerae by controlling the switch between biofilm production and dispersal through quorum sensing. At low cell densities and when CAI-1 levels are minimal, V. cholerae favors biofilm formation as a survival strategy in environmental reservoirs. Biofilms protect the bacteria from environmental stresses and allow them to persist in aquatic environments. As cell density increases and CAI-1 accumulates, it activates the quorum sensing pathways that inhibit further biofilm formation and promote dispersal, enabling the bacteria to spread and infect new hosts.

As part of the quorum sensing system, CAI-1 primarily functions to sense the presence of Vibrio species and integrate signals from multiple autoinducers. Research shows that while CAI-1 alone can initiate a response at low cell densities, both CAI-1 and the more abundantly produced autoinducer-2 (AI-2) must be present in sufficient quantities to fully repress biofilm formation. This dual autoinducer system allows V. cholerae to assess both its own population and the presence of other bacterial species in the environment, changing its biofilm behavior based on its surroundings.

These insights suggest that CAI-1 plays a key role in ensuring that V. cholerae only disperses from biofilms when sufficient bacterial density is achieved, and when the surrounding environment supports successful transmission and colonization. This makes CAI-1 a potential target for therapies aimed at disrupting biofilm formation to control cholera outbreaks.

== Signaling pathway ==
Quorum sensing in V. cholerae behaves and communicates based on the amount of bacterial cells present. When the concentration of CAI-1 reaches a certain limit it binds to CqsS (a receptor for CAI-1), activating the transcription of virulence genes – including those responsible for the production of cholera toxin – due to the phosphorylation cascade caused by the binding of CqsS. Because of the ability for V. cholerae to adapt to its environment through CAI-1's ability to facilitate communication, it increases the pathogenic abilities in the host.

The downstream signaling cascades that are triggered by CAI-1 binding to CqsS include multiple regulatory pathways. CqsS undergoes autophosphorylation which involves the transfer of the phosphate group to LuxO, a response regulator. This activates LuxO, which in turn inhibits the synthesis of HapR, a master regulator, through the expression of small regulatory RNAs (sRNAs). As the HapR levels decrease there is upregulation of virulence factors and biofilm formation which allows for efficient adaptation to the host environment, thereby enhancing the ability of the bacteria to cause infection.

== Function in Vibrio cholerae pathogenesis ==
As an important signaling molecule, CAI-1 has a role in regulating virulence factors through its quorum sensing mechanism. In the case of the cholera toxin, as V. cholerae multiplies and the amount of CAI-1 increases and accumulates, genes of the virulence factors are expressed, including the ones that encode for the cholera toxin. This toxin has the ability to disrupt electrolyte balance in intestinal epithelial cells, which can lead to issues including severe diarrhea, a common symptom of cholera toxin. In addition to the cholera toxin, other virulence factors such as surface adhesins are expressed, with these being essential in helping the bacteria to adhere to the intestinal mucosa and thereby assist the bacteria in its pathogenic properties.

Because CAI-1 assists in facilitating biofilm formation, it plays a significant role in promoting colonization of the human gut. This provides a way for V. cholerae to avoid attacks from the host immune responses as well as any antibiotics. The signaling cascades initiated by CAI-1 enable V. cholerae to survive and cause infection in the harsh conditions of the gut. This suggests that observing the important role of CAI-1 in V. cholerae could highlight key targets for any future therapeutic intervention.
