= Polymorphic toxins =

Polymorphic toxins (PTs) are multi-domain proteins primarily involved in competition between bacteria but also involved in pathogenesis when injected in eukaryotic cells. They are found in all major bacterial clades.

Bacteria live in complex multispecies communities such as biofilms and human-associated microbiotas. The dynamics and structure of these communities are greatly influenced by interbacterial competition through the secretion of toxic effectors. Bacteria have evolved several systems to outcompete their neighbors by poisoning them through a contact-dependent killing (including effectors of type V and VI secretion systems) or the release of soluble toxins (including colicins) in the environment.

== Definition ==
Polymorphic toxins are bacterial exotoxins which share common features regarding their domain architecture.

Each family of PTs is defined by a conserved N-terminal region associated with diverse C-terminal (CT) toxic domains, which can be found in several other PT families. The fact that toxic domains are shared between several families of PTs is a hallmark of this category of toxins. A pool of more than 150 distinct toxic domains have been predicted by an in silico study. The most frequent toxic activities found among PTs are RNases, DNases, peptidases and protein-modifying activities.

PTs are involved in killing or inhibiting the growth of bacterial competitors lacking the adequate immunity protein. Indeed, in PT systems, a gene encoding a protective immunity protein is always located immediately downstream of the toxin gene. The immunity protein is present in the cytoplasm to protect the toxin producing-cell both from auto-intoxication and from toxin produced by other strains.

== Polymorphic toxin families ==
The most studied PT families encompass colicins, toxic effectors of type V secretion systems, some toxic effectors of type VI secretion systems and MafB toxins.

- Colicins
- Contact-Dependent Growth Inhibition (CDI) systems: CdiA toxins
- Rhs toxins
- "Extended" VgrG toxins
- "Extended" Hcp toxins
- MafB toxins

== See also ==
- Exotoxin
