= Exotoxin =

Toxin from bacteria that destroys or disrupts cells

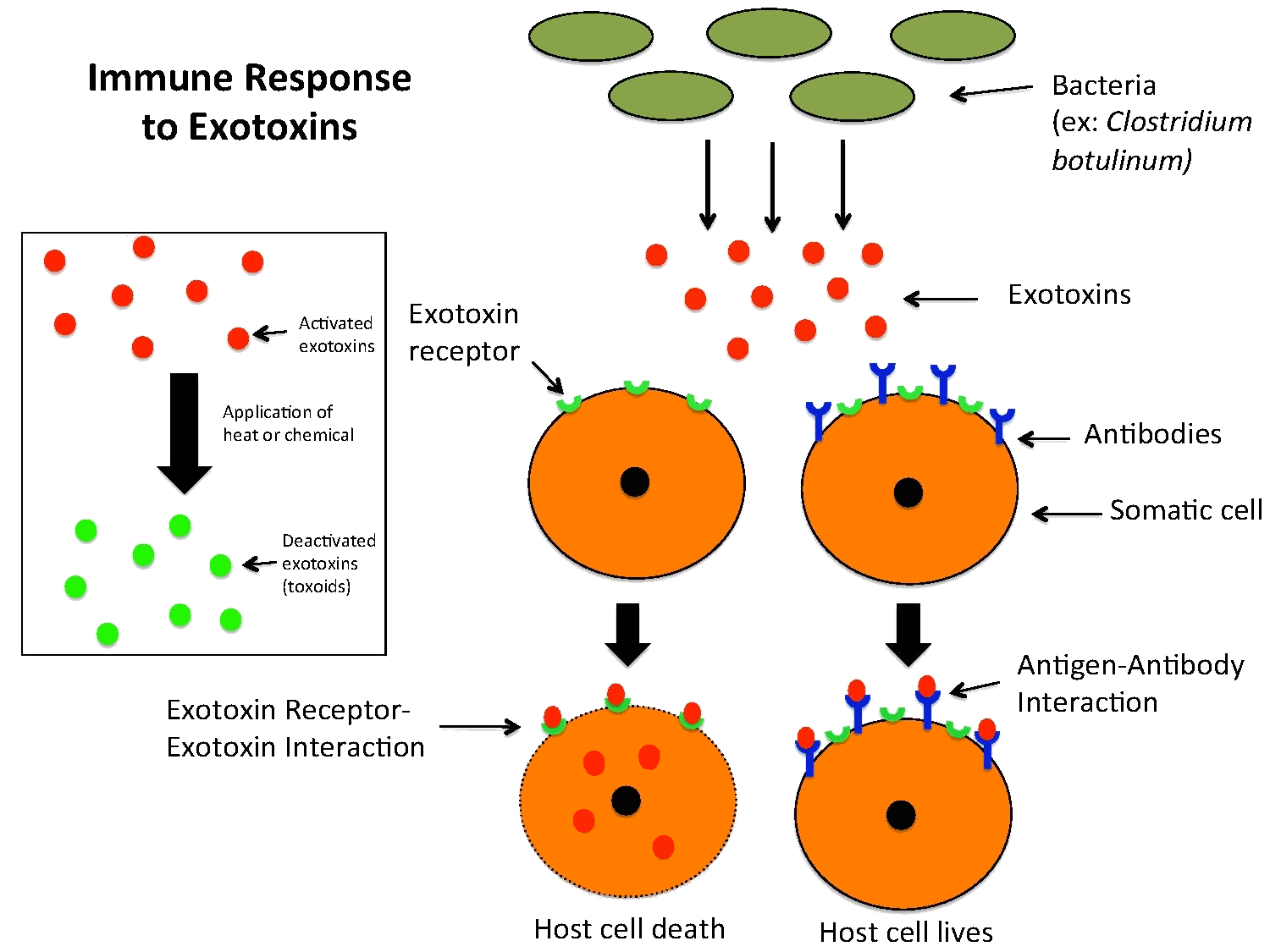
This figure shows that exotoxins are secreted by bacterial cells, Clostridium botulinum for example, and are toxic to somatic cells. Somatic cells have antibodies on the cell wall to target exotoxins and bind to them, preventing the invasion of somatic cells. The binding of the exotoxin and antibody forms an antigen-antibody interaction and the exotoxins are targeted for destruction by the immune system. If this interaction does not happen, the exotoxins bind to the exotoxin receptors that are on the cell surface and causes death of the host cell by inhibiting protein synthesis. This figure also shows that the application of heat or chemicals to exotoxins can result in the deactivation of exotoxins. The deactivated exotoxins are called toxoids and they are not harmful to somatic cells.

An exotoxin is a toxin secreted by bacteria. An exotoxin can cause damage to the host by destroying cells or disrupting normal cellular metabolism. They are highly potent and can cause major damage to the host. Exotoxins may be secreted, or, similar to endotoxins, may be released during lysis of the cell. Gram negative pathogens may secrete outer membrane vesicles containing lipopolysaccharide endotoxin and some virulence proteins in the bounding membrane along with some other toxins as intra-vesicular contents, thus adding a previously unforeseen dimension to the well-known eukaryote process of membrane vesicle trafficking, which is quite active at the host–pathogen interface.

They may exert their effect locally or produce systemic effects. Well-known exotoxins include: botulinum toxin produced by Clostridium botulinum; Corynebacterium diphtheriae toxin, produced during life-threatening symptoms of diphtheria; tetanospasmin produced by Clostridium tetani. The toxic properties of most exotoxins can be inactivated by heat or chemical treatment to produce a toxoid. These retain their antigenic specificity and can be used to produce antitoxins and, in the case of diphtheria and tetanus toxoids, are used as vaccines.

Exotoxins are susceptible to antibodies produced by the immune system, but some exotoxins are so toxic that they may be fatal to the host before the immune system has a chance to mount defenses against them. In such cases, antitoxin, anti-serum containing antibodies, can sometimes be injected to provide passive immunity.

== Types ==
Many exotoxins have been categorized. This classification, while fairly exhaustive, is not the only system used. Other systems for classifying or identifying toxins include:

- By organism generating the toxin
- By organism susceptible to the toxin
- By secretion system used to release the toxin (for example, toxic effectors of type VI secretion system)
- By tissue target type susceptible to the toxin (neurotoxins affect the nervous system, cardiotoxins affect the heart, etc.)
- By structure (for example, AB5 toxin)
- By domain architecture of the toxin (for example, polymorphic toxins)
- By the ability of the toxin to endure in hostile environments, such as heat, dryness, radiation, or salinity. In this context, "labile" implies susceptibility, and "stable" implies a lack of susceptibility.
- By a letter, such as "A", "B", or "C", to communicate the order in which they were identified.

The same exotoxin may have different names, depending on the field of research.

=== Type I: cell surface-active ===
Type I toxins bind to a receptor on the cell surface and stimulate intracellular signaling pathways. Two examples are described below.

==== Superantigens ====
Superantigens are produced by several bacteria. The best-characterized superantigens are those produced by the strains of Staphylococcus aureus and Streptococcus pyogenes that cause toxic shock syndrome. Superantigens bridge the MHC class II protein on antigen-presenting cells with the T-cell receptor on the surface of T cells with a particular Vβ chain. As a consequence, up to 50% of all T cells are activated, leading to massive secretion of proinflammatory cytokines, which produce the symptoms of toxic shock.

==== Heat-stable enterotoxins ====
Some strains of E. coli produce heat-stable enterotoxins (ST), which are small peptides that are able to withstand heat treatment at 100 °C. Different STs recognize distinct receptors on the cell surface and thereby affect different intracellular signaling pathways. For example, STa enterotoxins bind and activate membrane-bound guanylate cyclase, which leads to the intracellular accumulation of cyclic GMP and downstream effects on several signaling pathways. These events lead to the loss of electrolytes and water from intestinal cells.

=== Type II: membrane damaging ===
Membrane-damaging toxins exhibit hemolysin or cytolysin activity in vitro. However, induction of cell lysis may not be the primary function of the toxins during infection. At low concentrations of toxin, more subtle effects such as modulation of host cell signal transduction may be observed in the absence of cell lysis. Membrane-damaging toxins can be divided into two categories, the channel-forming toxins and toxins that function as enzymes that act on the membrane.

==== Channel-forming toxins ====
Most channel-forming toxins, which form pores in the target cell membrane, can be classified into two families: the cholesterol-dependent toxins and the RTX toxins.

- Cholesterol-dependent cytolysins

Formation of pores by cholesterol-dependent cytolysins (CDC) requires the presence of cholesterol in the target cell. The size of the pores formed by members of this family is extremely large: 25–30 nm in diameter. All CDCs are secreted by the type II secretion system; the exception is pneumolysin, which is released from the cytoplasm of Streptococcus pneumoniae when the bacteria lyse.

The CDCs Streptococcus pneumoniae Pneumolysin, Clostridium perfringens perfringolysin O, and Listeria monocytogenes listeriolysin O cause specific modifications of histones in the host cell nucleus, resulting in down-regulation of several genes that encode proteins involved in the inflammatory response. Histone modification does not involve the pore-forming activity of the CDCs.

- RTX toxins

RTX toxins can be identified by the presence of a specific tandemly repeated nine-amino acid residue sequence in the protein. The prototype member of the RTX toxin family is haemolysin A (HlyA) of E. coli. RTX is also found in Legionella pneumophila.

==== Enzymatically active toxins ====
One example is the α toxin of C. perfringens, which causes gas gangrene; α toxin has phospholipase activity.

=== Type III: intracellular ===
Type III exotoxins can be classified by their mode of entry into the cell, or by their mechanism once inside.

==== By mode of entry ====
Intracellular toxins must be able to gain access to the cytoplasm of the target cell to exert their effects.

- Some bacteria deliver toxins directly from their cytoplasm to the cytoplasm of the target cell through a needle-like structure. The effector proteins injected by the type III secretion apparatus of Yersinia into target cells are one example.
- Another group of intracellular toxins is the AB toxins. The 'B'-subunit (binding) attaches to target regions on cell membranes, the 'A'-subunit (active) enters through the membrane and possesses enzymatic function that affects internal cellular bio-mechanisms. A common example of this A-subunit activity is called ADP-ribosylation in which the A-subunit catalyzes the addition of an ADP-ribose group onto specific residues on a protein. The structure of these toxins allows for the development of specific vaccines and treatments. Certain compounds can be attached to the B unit, which is not, in general, harmful, which the body learns to recognize, and which elicits an immune response. This allows the body to detect the harmful toxin if it is encountered later, and to eliminate it before it can cause harm to the host. Toxins of this type include cholera toxin, pertussis toxin, Shiga toxin and heat-labile enterotoxin from E. coli.

==== By mechanism ====
Once in the cell, many of the exotoxins act at the eukaryotic ribosomes (especially the 60S subunit), as protein synthesis inhibitors.

- Some exotoxins act directly at the ribosome to inhibit protein synthesis. An example is Shiga toxin.
- Other toxins act at elongation factor-2. In the case of the diphtheria toxin, EF2 is ADP-ribosylated and becomes unable to participate in protein elongation, and, so, the cell dies. Pseudomonas exotoxin has a similar action.

Other intracellular toxins do not directly inhibit protein synthesis.

- For example, Cholera toxin ADP-ribosylates, thereby activating tissue adenylate cyclase to increase the concentration of cAMP, which causes the movement of massive amounts of fluid and electrolytes from the lining of the small intestine and results in life-threatening diarrhea.
- Another example is Pertussis toxin.

=== Extracellular matrix damage ===
These "toxins" allow the further spread of bacteria and, as a consequence, deeper tissue infections. Examples are hyaluronidase and collagenase. These molecules, however, are enzymes that are secreted by a variety of organisms and are not usually considered toxins. They are often referred to as virulence factors, since they allow the organisms to move deeper into the hosts tissues.

== Medical applications ==
=== Vaccinations ===
Exotoxins have been used to produce vaccines. This process involves inactivating the toxin, creating a toxoid that does not induce toxin-related illness and is well tolerated. A widely used toxoid vaccine is the DPT vaccine, which is usually administered in multiple doses throughout childhood with adjuvants and boosters for long-term immunity. DPT vaccine protects against pertussis, tetanus and diphtheria infections, caused by the exotoxin-producing Bordetella pertussis, Clostridium tetani and Corynebacterium diphtheriae respectively. Vaccination with the toxoids generates antibodies against the exotoxins, forming immunological memory as protection against subsequent infections. The DPT vaccination may cause adverse side effects, such as swelling, redness and fever, and is contraindicated in some populations. Effective vaccination schedules have reduced rates of mortality linked to pertussis, tetanus and diphtheria but formal controlled trials to test the efficacy of the vaccine have not been conducted. Additionally, pertussis persists endemically and is one of the most common causes of vaccine-preventable deaths.

=== Cancer treatment ===
As exotoxins are highly potent, there has been development in their application to cancer treatment. Cancer cells can be eliminated without destroying normal cells like in chemotherapy or radiation by attaching an antibody or receptor ligand to the exotoxin, creating a recombinant toxin that is targeted to certain cells. The cancer cell is killed once the toxin is internalized; for example, Pseudomonas exotoxin disrupts protein synthesis after cellular uptake. Multiple versions of recombinant exotoxin A, secreted by Pseudomonas aeruginosa, have entered clinical trials against tumor growth but have yet to be approved by Food and Drug Administration (FDA). A recombinant diphtheria exotoxin has been approved by the FDA for treatment of cutaneous T-cell lymphoma, an immune system cancer. Further testing to improve clinical efficacy of treatment using recombinant exotoxins continues.

== See also ==
- Infectious disease
- Mycotoxin
- Membrane vesicle trafficking
