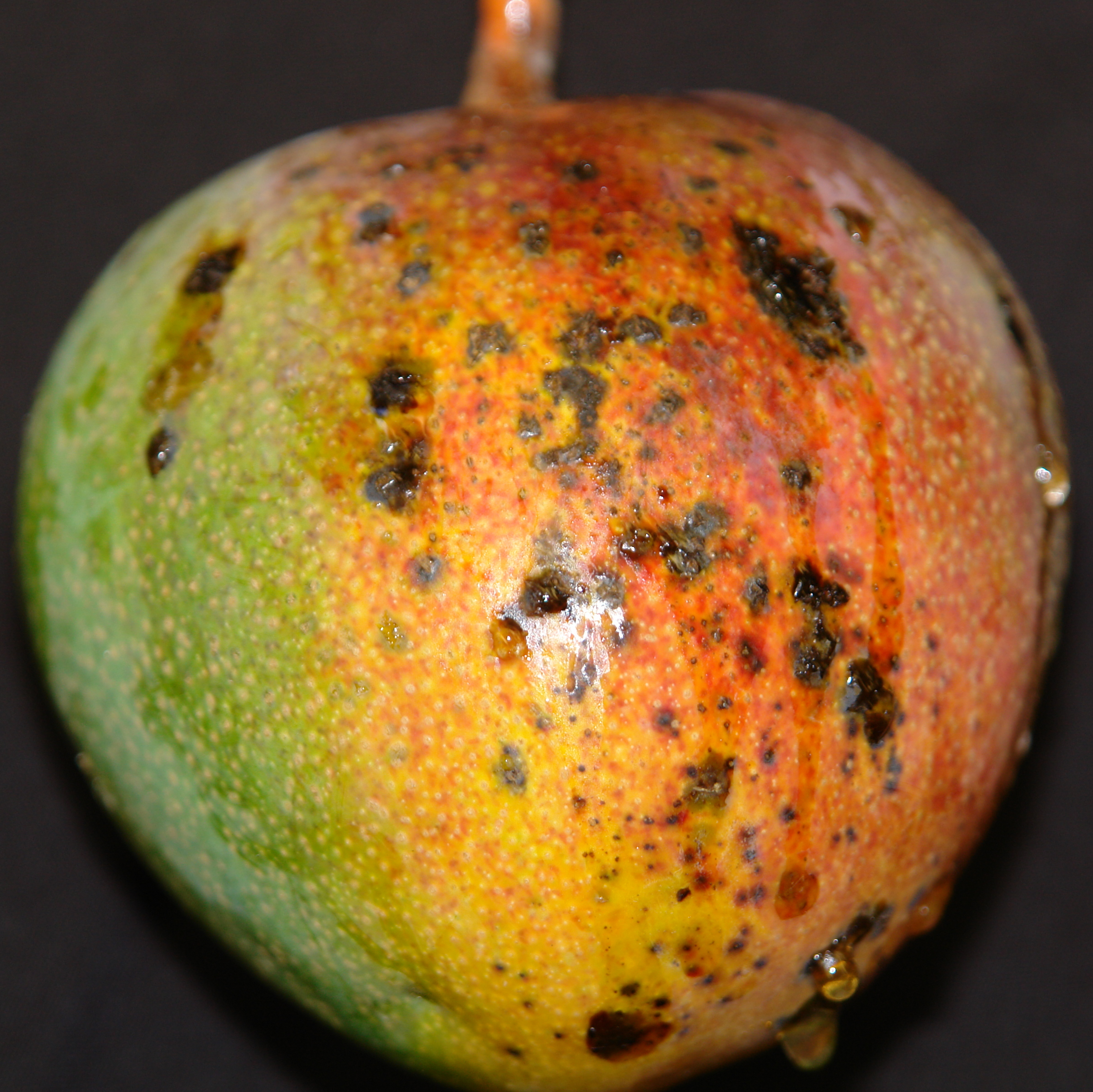
- Bacterial X. citri black spot on a mango, note that each black lesion has “cracks”

Scientific classification
- Domain: Bacteria
- Kingdom: Pseudomonadati
- Phylum: Pseudomonadota
- Class: Gammaproteobacteria
- Order: Lysobacterales
- Family: Lysobacteraceae
- Genus: Xanthomonas
- Species: X. citri

Binomial name
- Xanthomonas citri (Hasse 1915) Gabriel et al. 1989

= Xanthomonas citri =

Species of bacterium

Xanthomonas citri is a Gram-negative, rod-shaped bacterium. Although it is harmless for humans, it is a phytopathogen, known for being the causing agent of citrus canker.

Many pathovars are misclassified as X. cissicola, X. campestris, or X. axonopodis. A 2022 study proposes moving 20 pathovars in these three (including the sole representative of X. cissicola) into X. citri. However, based on the principle of priority, all "X. citri" should become instead named under the earliest-published name, X. cissicola like in GTDB. The two proposals do not affect the independence of X. campestris and X. axonopodis, as their type strains are sufficiently distinct from X. citri/cissicola to be their own species.

== Pathovars included ==
Uncited entries are based on Bansal et al. (2022), either in the article's own results (20 pathovars) or in its description of earlier results. Pathovars that include the type strain of either X. citri or X. cissicola are shown in bold.

- **citri**
- viticola
- vitiswoodrowii
- bauhiniae
- martyniicola
- vitiscarnosae
- vitistrifoliae
- khayae
- **cissicola**
- melhusii
- bilvae
- azadirachtae
- durantae
- cajani
- clitoriae
- centellae
- thespesiae
- leeana
- sesbaniae
- merremiae
- thirumalacharii
- trichodesmae
- aurantfolii

The list is unlikely to be complete.

== Bacterial killing via a secretion system ==
Xanthomonas citri uses its type IV secretion system to kill other Gram-negative bacterial species in a contact-dependent manner. The secretion of the effector proteins requires a conserved C-terminal domain, and its bacteriolytic activity is neutralized by a cognate immunity protein.

== Defense against predators ==
Xanthomonas citri also uses type VI secretion system in defense against the predatory amoeba Dictyostelium discoideum.
