= ESAT-6 =

Protein made by Mycobacterium tuberculosis

6 kDa early secretory antigenic target

Identifiers
- Symbol: esxA
- NCBI gene: 886209
- PDB: 3FAV
- UniProt: P0A564
Search for
- Structures: Swiss-model
- Domains: InterPro

ESAT-6 or early secreted antigenic target 6 kDa, is produced by Mycobacterium tuberculosis, it is a secretory protein and potent T cell antigen. It is used in tuberculosis diagnosis by the whole blood interferon γ test QuantiFERON-TB Gold, in conjunction with CFP-10.

ESAT-6 has been shown to directly bind to the TLR2 receptor, inhibiting downstream signal transduction. It has also been studied that the inactivation of ESAT-6 leads to decreased virulence of M. tuberculosis. Secretion of the ESAT-6 protein is one of the main determining factors in the virulence of the M. tuberculosis. ESAT-6 has more commonly become a marker for the TB diagnosis and treatment. There is also the use of the ESAT increase the production of virulent factors that cause for the increase in pathogenicity of TB.

ESAT-6 is one of the main proteins that is inhibited in the production of vaccines for M. tuberculosis with the combination of the increased antigenic factors agβ5-A and the agβ5-C. There are studies that are currently trying to connect the linkage between ESAT-6 and the epithelial cells that are in the lungs, which has shown the dependence on the induction of the IL-8 promoter.

== ESAT-6 and CFP-10 ==
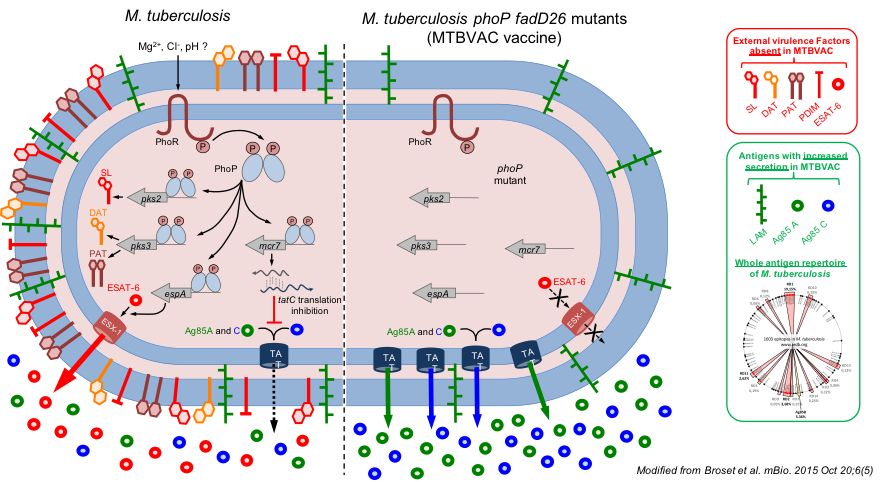
The phoP and fadD26 rational inactivation in MTBVAC results in virulence attenuation and enhanced immunogenicity relative to the M. tuberculosis pathogen

There are also connections between the ESAT-6 marker and the CFP-10 marker. These are both produced in Mycobacterium tuberculosis cells and are subject to a positive correlation of virulence to the amount of protein produced. Recent work shows that the production of these proteins is a process that is caused by the flanking genes. ESAT-6 and CFP-10 have also been increasingly used for in house antigen tests that now allow for quick testing of antibodies for the use of TB, but there are still determinations being made on what levels of these antigens or antibodies would be considered normal.

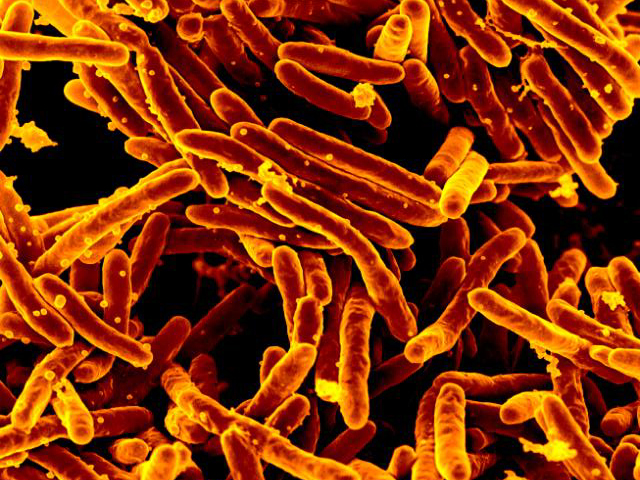
Microscope view of M. tuberculosis
