= Twin-arginine translocation pathway =

Protein export pathway

TatC

Identifiers
- Symbol: TatC
- Pfam: PF00902
- InterPro: IPR002033
- TCDB: 2.A.64
- OPM superfamily: 63
- OPM protein: 4b4a
- Membranome: 435
Available protein structures:
- PDB: IPR002033 PF00902 (ECOD; PDBsum)
- AlphaFold: IPR002033; PF00902

TatA/B/E

Identifiers
- Symbol: MttA_Hcf106
- Pfam: PF02416
- InterPro: IPR003369
- TCDB: 2.A.64
- OPM superfamily: 63
- OPM protein: 2l16
Available protein structures:
- PDB: IPR003369 PF02416 (ECOD; PDBsum)
- AlphaFold: IPR003369; PF02416

The twin-arginine translocation pathway (Tat pathway) is a protein export, or secretion pathway found in plants, bacteria, and archaea. In contrast to the Sec pathway which transports proteins in an unfolded manner, the Tat pathway serves to actively translocate folded proteins across a lipid membrane bilayer. In plants, the Tat translocase is located in the thylakoid membrane of the chloroplast, where it acts to export proteins into the thylakoid lumen. In bacteria, the Tat translocase is found in the cytoplasmic membrane and serves to export proteins to the cell envelope, or to the extracellular space. The existence of a Tat translocase in plant mitochondria is also proposed.

In the plant thylakoid membrane and in Gram-negative bacteria the Tat translocase is composed of three essential membrane proteins; TatA, TatB, and TatC. In the most widely studied Tat pathway, that of the Gram-negative bacterium Escherichia coli, these three proteins are expressed from an operon with a fourth Tat protein, TatD, which is not required for Tat function. A fifth Tat protein TatE that is homologous to the TatA protein is present at a much lower level in the cell than TatA and is not believed to play any significant role in Tat function.

The Tat pathways of Gram-positive bacteria differ in that they do not have a TatB component. In these bacteria the Tat system is made up from a single TatA and TatC component, with the TatA protein being bifunctional and fulfilling the roles of both E. coli TatA and TatB.

The name of the Tat pathway relates to a highly conserved twin-arginine leader motif (S/TRRXFLK) which is found in the N terminal Signal peptide of the corresponding passenger proteins. The signal peptide is removed by a signal peptidase after release of the transported protein from the Tat complex. At least two TatC molecules co-exist within each Tat translocon.

== In pathogens ==
Not all bacteria carry the tatABC genes in their genome; however, of those that do, there seems to be no discrimination between pathogens and nonpathogens. Despite that fact, some pathogenic bacteria such as Pseudomonas aeruginosa, Legionella pneumophila, Yersinia pseudotuberculosis, and E. coli O157:H7 rely on a functioning Tat pathway for full virulence in infection models. In addition, a number of exported virulence factors have been shown to rely on the Tat pathway. One such category of virulence factors are the phospholipase C enzymes, which have been shown to be Tat-exported in Pseudomonas aeruginosa, and thought to be Tat-exported in Mycobacterium tuberculosis.
