= Type VI secretion system =

Bacterial molecular machine

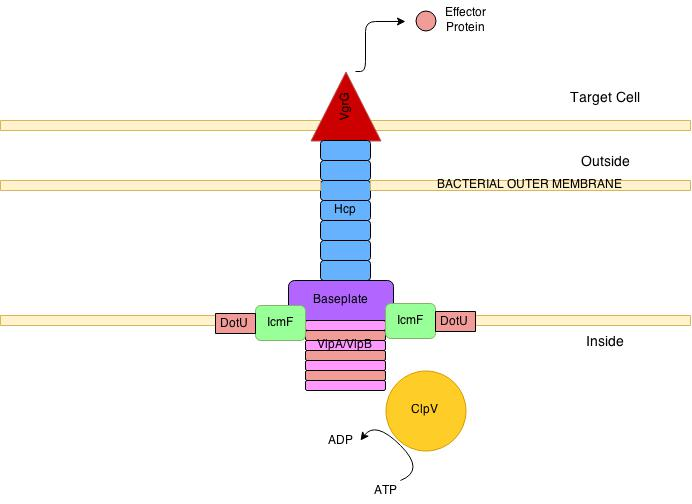
Structure of a Type VI secretion system

The type VI secretion system (T6SS) is one of the bacterial secretion systems, membrane protein complexes, used by a wide range of gram-negative bacteria to transport effectors. Effectors are moved from the interior of a bacterial cell, across the membrane into an adjacent target cell. While often reported that the T6SS was discovered in 2006 by researchers studying the causative agent of cholera, Vibrio cholerae, the first study demonstrating that T6SS genes encode a protein export apparatus was actually published in 2004, in a study of protein secretion by the fish pathogen Edwardsiella tarda.

Since then, it is estimated that at least a quarter of all pathogenic and non-pathogenic proteobacterial genomes encode for a T6SS, including pathogens of animals, plants, and humans, as well as soil, environmental or marine bacteria. Genes encoding for the T6SSs are commonly found chromosomally, but can also be harboured in mobile genetic elements and on plasmids mediating their transfer and increase in genetic diversity. While most of the early studies of Type VI secretion focused on its role in the pathogenesis of higher organisms, it is now known to function primarily in interbacterial antagonism. Studies have also shown that T6SS plays a role in the acquisition of essential metals, such as manganese and iron, from the surrounding environment. This ability allows bacteria to outcompete rivals for these nutrients while fostering cooperation with related bacterial cells. This suggests that T6SS plays a critical role in maintaining microbial community stability by balancing cooperation and competition.

== Structure and mechanism ==
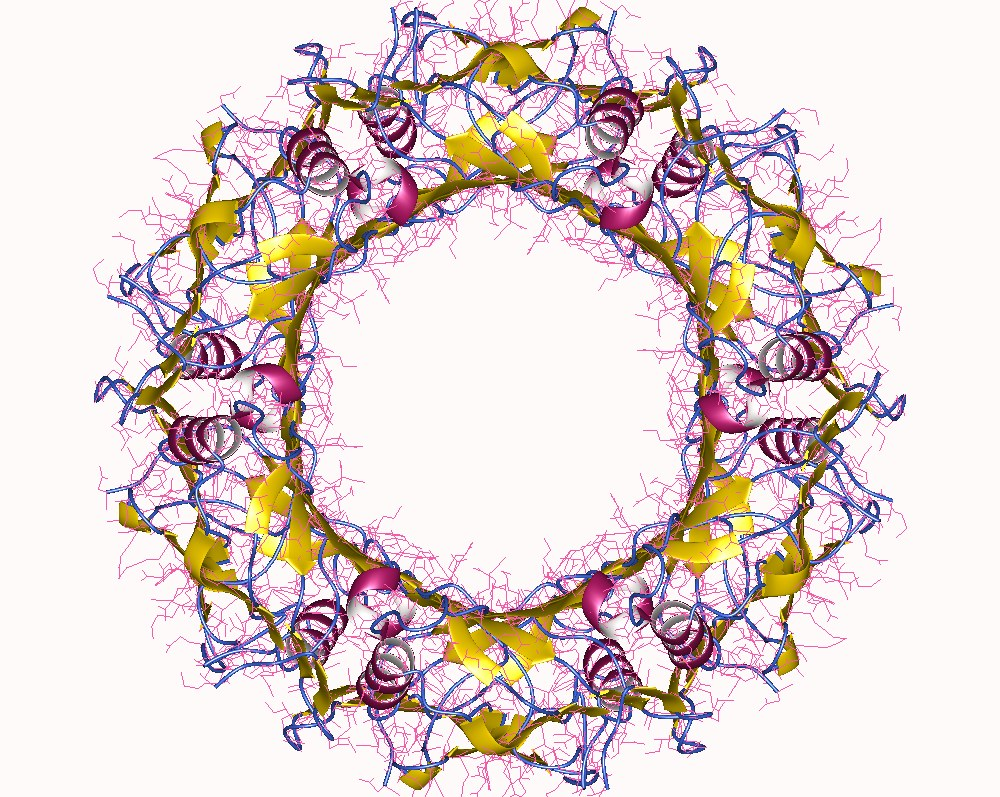
An oligomer formed by one of proteins from Type VI secretion system in Burkholderia pseudomallei.

The T6SS is thought to resemble an inverted phage extending outward from the bacterial cell surface. It consists of 14 proteins that assemble into three sub-complexes: a phage tail-like tubule, a phage baseplate-like structure, and cell-envelope spanning membrane complex. These three subcomplexes work together to transport proteins across the bacterial cell envelope and into a target cell through a contractile mechanism

=== Phage tail-like ===
The phage tail-like component of the T6SS is a dynamic tubular structure that undergoes cycles of assembly and disassembly. It can be up to 600 nm long, and has been visualized extending across the bacterial cytoplasm in electron micrographs. The tubules consist of repeating units of the proteins TssA and TssB (VipA/VipB) arranged as a sheath around a tube built from stacked hexameric rings of the haemolysin co-regulated protein (Hcp). At the tip of the Hcp tube sits a trimer of the phage tail spike-like protein VgrG, which is in turn capped by a pointed PAAR domain-containing protein. Contraction of the sheath is thought to propel the Hcp tube, VgrG and associated substrates outside of the bacterial cell, where the VgrG/PAAR spike facilitates penetration of the membrane of a neighboring cell. The tubule structure is dismantled through the action of the ATP-degrading protein ClpV, which sits at the tubule base.

=== Baseplate ===
The phage tail-like tubule of the T6SS assembles on a structure analogous to bacteriophage baseplates. It consists of the proteins TssE, TssF, TssG, and TssK. The baseplate and phage tail-like complex interact in the bacterial cytoplasm, and then are recruited to the cell envelope by the membrane complex.

=== Membrane ===
The T6SS membrane complex is responsible for anchoring the apparatus to the cellular membrane, and provides the channel through which substrates are propelled by the contraction of the phage tail-like tubule. This large (1.7 md) complex is formed from 10 interacting units of a heterotrimer containing TssJ, TssM and TssL. It is believed to span from the inner membrane to the outer membrane of the Gram negative bacterial cell envelope, forming a channel that opens and closes with a unique iris-like mechanism.

=== Substrate recognition ===
Unlike substrates of other secretion systems (such as the general secretory pathway or secretion systems III and IV), those of the T6SS are not known to have any universally identifying features. Instead, they are recognized and selected for secretion through one of two structural components of the apparatus. One class of substrates binds within the pore of a hemolysin-coregulated protein (Hcp) hexamer. Since substrates are unstable in the absence of this interaction, it is thought that the substrate-Hcp complexes are secreted together, rather than Hcp serving as a passive tubule through which substrates pass. Members of the second class of substrates are targeted for secretion via interaction with the phage tail spike-like protein VgrG. These substrates are often modular proteins, such as the Rhs toxins, that possess PAAR domain for interaction with VgrG at one end. There are also instances where a VgrG and a substrate are both part of the same protein.

== Antibacterial ==
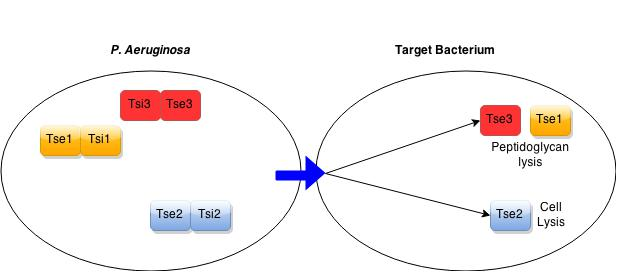
The antibacterial mechanism in P. aeruginosa. P. aeruginosa have self-immunity to their own effector toxins: Tsi proteins bind and stabilise Tse toxins, preventing cell senescence and peptidoglycan cell wall lysis.

A wide range of Gram-negative bacteria have been shown to have antibacterial T6SSs, including opportunistic pathogens such as Pseudomonas aeruginosa, obligate commensal species that inhabit the human gut (Bacteroides spp.), and plant-associated bacteria such as Agrobacterium tumefaciens. These systems exert antibacterial activity via the function of their secreted substrates. All characterized bacterial-targeting T6SS proteins act as toxins, either by killing or preventing the growth of target cells. The mechanisms of toxicity toward target cells exhibited by T6SS substrates are diverse, but typically involve targeting of highly conserved bacterial structures, including degradation of the cell wall through amidase or glycohydrolase activity, disruption of cell membranes through lipase activity or pore formation, cleavage of DNA, and degradation of the essential metabolite NAD+. T6SS-positive bacterial species prevent T6SS-mediated intoxication towards self and kin cells by producing immunity proteins specific to each secreted toxin. The immunity proteins function by binding to the toxin proteins, often at their active site, thereby blocking their activity.

== Anti-eukaryotic ==
Although the ancestral function of the T6SS appears to be targeting of bacteria, a handful of systems have been identified that have evolved to target eukaryotic cells. In general, these eukaryote-targeting systems are involved in causing disease. For example, the intracellular pathogen Francisella tularensis requires the activity of a T6SS to escape from phagosomes and replicate in the cytoplasm of macrophages. The mechanism by which secreted proteins facilitate F. tularensis virulence is still unknown. The T6SS of Vibrio cholerae has a dual role, being able to target both bacterial and eukaryotic cells. At least one substrate it secretes is specialized for eukaryotic cell-targeting, functioning by cross-linking the cytoskeleton protein actin. Burkholderia pseudomallei and Edwardsiella tarda are two other organisms which possess a T6SS that appears dedicated for eukaryotic targeting. The T6SS of plant pathogen Xanthomonas citri protects it from predatory amoeba Dictyostelium discoideum.

== Regulation ==
=== GacS/Rsm system ===
Some research has gone into regulation of T6SS by two component systems. In P. aeruginosa, it has been observed that the GacS/Rsm two-component system is involved in type VI secretion system regulation. This system regulates the expression of Rsm small regulatory RNA molecules, and has also been implicated in biofilm formation. Upon the GacS/Rsm pathway stimulation, an increase in Rsm molecules leads to inhibition of mRNA-binding protein RsmA. RsmA is a translational inhibitor that binds to sequences near the ribosome-binding site for T6SS gene expression. This level of regulation has also been observed in P. fluorescens and P. syringae.

=== Quorum sensing ===
There are various examples in which quorum sensing regulates T6SS. In Vibrio cholerae T6SS studies, it has been observed that serotype O37 has high vas gene expression. Serotypes O139 and O1 on the other hand exhibit the opposite, with markedly low vas gene expression. It has been suggested that the differences in expression are attributable to differences in quorum-sensing levels. In Vibrio cholerae, autoinducer-1 (AI-1) signals are detected by LuxQ, a sensor kinase. LuxQ activates LuxU, which then acts on LuxO, a DNA-binding protein which represses HapR gene expression. HapR is thought to LuxO deletions resulted in strong induction of vas gene expression, and hence T6SS expression, demonstrating that T6SS is regulated in some form by quorum sensing. However, O1 strains with LuxO deletions still had relatively quiescent T6SS compared to the O37 strain, suggesting that additional factors are also involved.

== See also ==
- Two-component regulatory system
