= FEMS Microbiology Letters =

Academic journal

FEMS Microbiology Letter
- Discipline: Microbiology
- Language: English
- Edited by: Dr Clare Taylor

Publication details
- History: 1977–present
- Publisher: Oxford University Press
- Frequency: Monthly
- Impact factor: 2.2 (2023)

Standard abbreviations
- ISO 4: FEMS Microbiol. Lett.

Indexing
- CODEN: FMLED7
- ISSN: 0378-1097 (print); 1574-6968 (web)
- LCCN: 78642880
- OCLC no.: 03217327

Links
- Journal homepage

FEMS Microbiology Letters is a peer-reviewed scientific journal covering all aspects of microbiology, including virology. The journal was established in 1977 and is published by Oxford University Press on behalf of the Federation of European Microbiological Societies. The Editor-in-Chief was Dr Rich Boden of the University of Plymouth 2014-2024 and the current Editor-in-Chief is Dr Clare Taylor of Edinburgh Napier University the end of 2024.

The journal gave rise to separate titles over the years but retained the subject areas of ecology and medical microbiology and indeed review articles as part of its scope nonetheless:

- FEMS Microbiology Immunology (1988), which was retitled FEMS Immunology and Medical Microbiology (1993) and is now Pathogens and Disease (2013).
- FEMS Microbiology Reviews (1985)
- FEMS Microbiology Ecology (1985)

== Abstracting and indexing ==
The journal is indexed and abstracted in the following bibliographic databases:

- Academic Search Premier
- Aquatic Sciences and Fisheries Abstracts
- BIOSIS Previews
- CAB Abstracts
- Chemical Abstracts Service
- Embase
- Food Science & Technology Abstracts
- MEDLINE
- Science Citation Index Expanded
- Scopus

According to the 2023 Journal Citation Reports, the journal has an impact factor of 2.2.

== Editors in Chief ==
- 2024-present: Dr Clare Taylor (Edinburgh Napier University)
- 2014–2024: Dr Rich Boden (University of Plymouth)
- 2002-2014: Prof. Jeff Cole (1942-2026, University of Birmingham)
- 1997-2002: Prof. Fergus 'Gus' Priest (1948–2019, Heriot-Watt University)
- 1991-?: Prof. Charles A. Fewson (1937-2005, University of Glasgow)
- 1981-1990: Prof. Edwin A. Dawes (University of Hull)
- 1977-1981: Prof. David W. Tempest (Free University of Amsterdam).
