= European Academy of Microbiology =

The European Academy of Microbiology, generally abbreviated as EAM, is a European institution made up of about 150 microbiology scientists, founded in 2009.

The main objective of the Academy is to be the authoritative voice of microbiology in Europe and thus enhance the potential of microbiology and microbiologists in Europe and globally. The Federation of European Microbiology Societies (FEMS) founded and supports the EAM, and many EAM members collaborate with FEMS in various capacities (e.g. directors, editors in chief of FEMS journals, etc.). The President of the EAM as of 1 January 2021 is Jörg Vogel.

== Origins ==
The idea of establishing an “Academy” of senior microbiologists within Europe, aimed to be an advisory source both for the Federation and governmental/other bodies, was strongly supported by FEMS executives. For this purpose, an ad-hoc committee for the admission of new member societies was set up to discuss and support this initiative, that was brought to the attention of the FEMS Council in 2007. The European Academy of Microbiology was established in June 2009 in Gothenburg (Sweden), with the goal of promoting excellence in microbiology across Europe.

== Members ==
The members of the European Academy of Microbiology are experts in microbiology with a notable record of publications, patents or inventions and important results and contributions to the microbiological community. The recruitment process is highly selective and based on a peer-review evaluation by the current members to uphold the high scientific standards of the EAM.

Members of the EAM include Cecilia Arraiano, Frédéric Barras, Melanie Blokesch, Emmanuelle Charpentier, Petra Dersch, Alain Filloux, Geoff Gadd, David Holden, Stipan Jonjić, Hilary Lappin-Scott, Tracy Palmer, Philippe Sansonetti, Geoffrey L Smith, Victor Sourjik and many more prominent microbiologists.

== Activities ==
In collaboration with other institutions and societies (e.g. FEMS) the Academy is involved in:

- the organization of high standard meetings and colloquia to discuss critical issues in microbiology;
- the publication of recommendations on critical issues in microbiology;
- the promotion of microbiology education;
- the establishment of special awards/prizes for microbiological achievements;
- supporting FEMS activities.

Examples of recent EAM activities are the 2011 meeting ‘EHEC infection and control’ following the European outbreak of the enterohemorrhagic Escherichia coli strain O104:H4, which was attended by world renowned experts in pathogenic E. coli and resulted in an authoritative case report. In May 2019, EAM and FEMS organized at the Pasteur Institute in Paris, France, a tribute to the life and work of Stanley Falkow (1934-2018) the founder of molecular microbial pathogenesis.
