= Michael Niederweis =

Professor of Microbiology

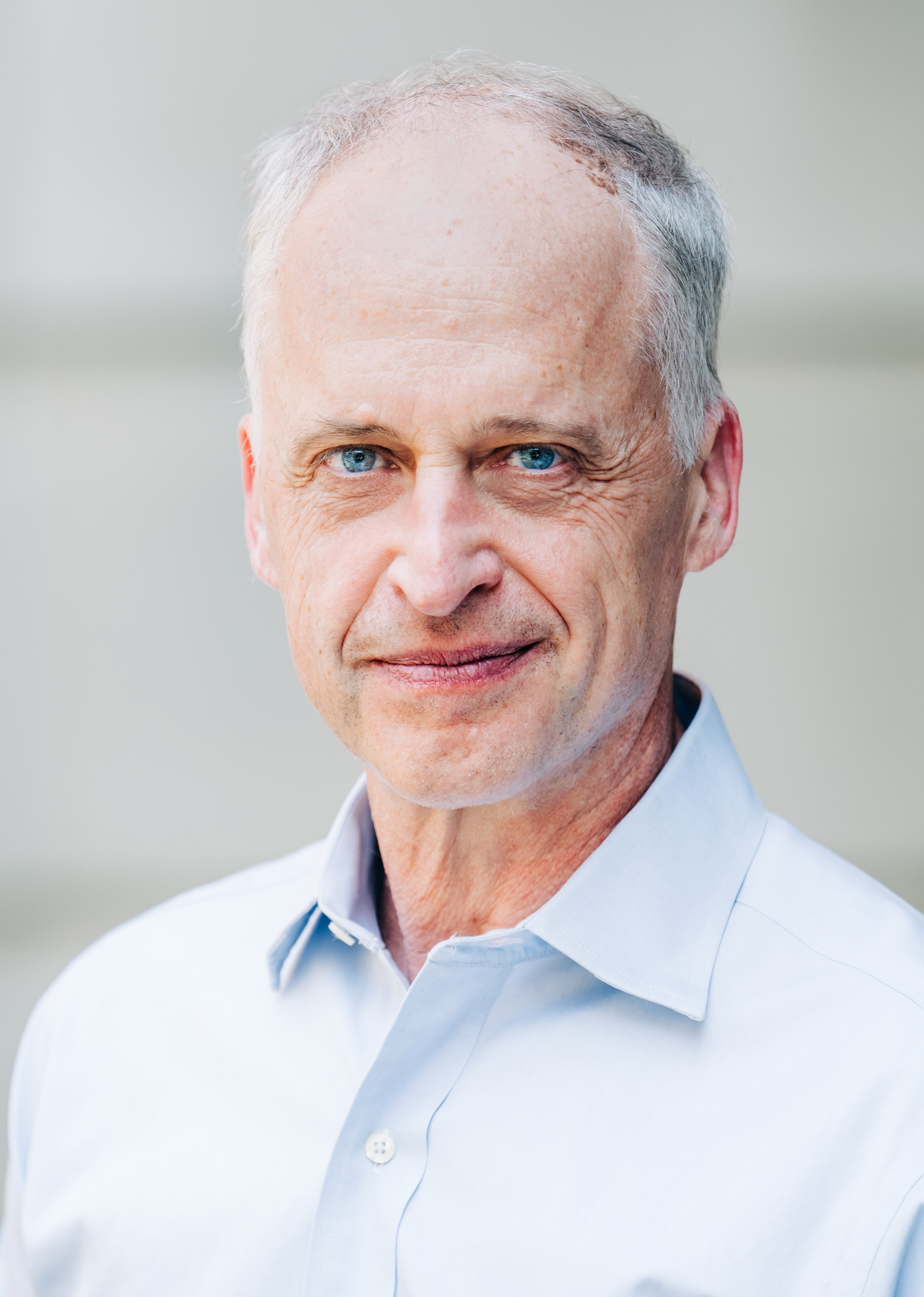
Michael Niederweis

Michael Niederweis (born 1964) is a German-American scientist, inventor, and academic. He is a university professor and the Triton Endowed Professor of Microbiology at the University of Alabama at Birmingham. Niederweis is known for his research on Mycobacterium tuberculosis.

His research on the discovery and characterization of the Mycobacterium smegmatis porin A (MspA) was the basis for a DNA sequencing technology known as nanopore sequencing.

== Early life ==
Niederweis was born and raised in Germany. He graduated with a diploma in chemistry from the Saarland University and a Ph.D. in microbiology from the University of Erlangen-Nuremberg.

== Academic career ==
Niederweis established his own laboratory at the University of Erlangen-Nuremberg in 1997. In 2004, he moved to the University of Alabama at Birmingham (UAB).

His research is focused on the discovery and characterization of mycobacterial outer membrane proteins. He has published several papers including identification of biochemical and structural characterization of the first mycobacterial porin (MspA). The visualization of a double membrane in mycobacteria by cryo-electron microscopy reshaped the understanding of drug resistance and pathogenicity of M. tuberculosis. Further discoveries include novel siderophore secretion and heme uptake systems of M. tuberculosis.

Niederweis and his team also identified the Tuberculosis Necrotizing Toxin (TNT), the first toxin shown to be produced by M. tuberculosis. His research involved how the pathogen kills host cells and survives within the human body.

The Niederweis laboratory at UAB has contributed to advancing the molecular understanding of tuberculosis.

His discovery of the MspA nanopore led to 25 patents issued in the United States and internationally.

== Honors and recognition ==
Niederweis is both a fellow and a senior member of the National Academy of Inventors. He is a fellow of the American Academy of Microbiology.

In 2001, he was awarded the Young Professor Award by the Society for Chemical Engineering and Biotechnology (Dechema). In 2003, he received the Young Investigator Award from the German Society for Hygiene and Microbiology.

Niederweis was appointed Endowed Professor of Bacteriology at UAB in 2017. In 2022, he was awarded the Triton Endowment established by UAB. His technologies were recognized by Nature Methods as the "method of the year" in long-read sequencing. In 2024, he was appointed as a UAB University Professor.

== Selected works ==
Niederweis' work has been published in more than 130 research articles in prominent journals, including:

- Niederweis, M., Ehrt, S., Heinz, C., Klöcker, U., Swiderek, K. M., Riley, L. W. and Benz, R.* (1999) Cloning of the mspA gene encoding the porin from Mycobacterium smegmatis Mol. Microbiol. 33, 933-945 (PMID 10476028)
- Faller, M., Niederweis, M. and Schulz, G. E.* (2004) The structure of a mycobacterial outer membrane channel. Science 303, 1189-1192 (PMID 14976314)
- Hoffmann, C., Leis, L., Niederweis, M., Plitzko, J. M. and Engelhardt, H.* (2008) Disclosure of the mycobacterial outer membrane: Cryo-electron tomography and vitreous sections reveal the lipid bilayer structure. Proc. Natl. Acad. Sci. USA 105, 3963-3967 (PMID 18316738; PMCID:PMC2268800)
- Butler, T. Z., M. Pavlenok, I. M. Derrington, M. Niederweis* and J. H. Gundlach* (2008) Single-Molecule DNA detection with an engineered MspA protein nanopore. Proc. Natl. Acad. Sci. USA 105, 20647-20652 (PMID 19098105;PMCID:PMC2634888)
- Derrington, I. M., T. Z. Butler, M. D. Collins, E. Manrao, M. Pavlenok, M. Niederweis and J. H. Gundlach* (2010) Nanopore DNA sequencing with MspA. Proc. Natl. Acad. Sci. USA 107, 16060-16065 (PMID 20798343; PMCID:PMC2941267)
- Manrao, E. A., Derrington, I. M., Laszlo, A. H., Langford, K. W., Hopper, M. K., Gillgren, N., Pavlenok, M., Niederweis, M. and Gundlach, J. H.* (2012) Reading DNA with the MspA nanopore and a motor enzyme. Nat. Biotechnol. 30, 349-53 (PMID 22446694; PMCID: PMC3757088)
- Wells, R. M., C. M. Jones, Z. Xi, A. Speer, O. Danilchanka, K. S. Doornbos, P. Sun, F. Wu, C. Tian and M. Niederweis* (2013) Discovery of a siderophore export system essential for virulence of Mycobacterium tuberculosis PLoS Pathogens 9, e1003120 (PMID 23431276, PMCID: PMC3561183)
- Jones, C. M., R. M. Wells, A. V. R. Madduri, M. B. Renfrow, C. Ratledge, D. B. Moody and M. Niederweis* (2014) Self-poisoning of Mycobacterium tuberculosis by interrupting siderophore recycling Proc. Natl. Acad. Sci. USA 111, 1945-50
- Sun, J., Siroy, A., Lokareddy, R. K., Speer, A., Doornbos, K. S., Cingolani, G.*, and Niederweis, M.* (2015) The Tuberculosis Necrotizing Toxin kills macrophages by hydrolyzing NAD. Nat. Struct. Mol. Biol. 22, 672-678 (PMID: 26237511)
- Pajuelo, D., González-Juarbe, N., Tak, U., Sun, J., Orihuela, C. J. and Niederweis, M.* (2018) NAD^{+} depletion triggers macrophage necroptosis, a cell death pathway exploited by Mycobacterium tuberculosis Cell Reports 24, 429-440 (PMID: 29996103)
- Mitra, A., Ko, Y.-H., Cingolani, G.* and Niederweis, M.* (2019) Heme and hemoglobin utilization by Mycobacterium tuberculosis Nat. Commun. 10, 4260 (PMID: 31534126)
- Tak, U., Dokland, T. and Niederweis, M.* (2021) Pore-forming Esx proteins mediate toxin secretion by Mycobacterium tuberculosis Nat. Commun. 12, 394 (PMID 33452244)
- Pajuelo, D., Tak, U., Zhang, L., Danilchanka, O., Tischler, A.D. and Niederweis, M.* (2021) Toxin secretion and trafficking by Mycobacterium tuberculosis Nat. Commun. 12, 6592. (PMID 34782620)
- Meikle, V, Zhang, L. and Niederweis, M.* (2023) Intricate link between siderophore secretion and drug efflux in Mycobacterium tuberculosis Antimicrob. Agents Chemother. 67, e0162922 (PMID 37676015)
- Earp, J. C., Garaeva, A. A., Meikle, V., Niederweis, M.*, and Seeger, M. A.* 2025) Structural basis of siderophore export and drug efflux by Mycobacterium tuberculosis. Nat. Commun. 16, 1934 (PMID 39994240)
- Nair, R.R., Meikle, V., Dubey, S., Pavlenok, M. and Niederweis, M.*(2025) Master control of protein secretion by Mycobacterium tuberculosis. Nat. Commun., in press
