= Edwin A. Dawes =

British biochemist (1925–2023)

- Born: 6 July 1925; Goole, West Riding of Yorkshire, United Kingdom
- Died: 3 March 2023 (aged 97)
- Other name: Eddie Dawes
- Education: University of Leeds (PhD)
- Occupations: Biochemist, magician
- Notable work: Quantitative Problems in Biochemistry; Microbial Energetics
- Children: 2 sons

Edwin Alfred Dawes (6 July 1925 – 3 March 2023) was a British biochemist and stage magician from Yorkshire. As a biochemist, he authored two textbooks and was the long-term and founding head of the Biochemistry department at the University of Hull, where he led its research into bioplastics. As a magician, he was an internationally recognised authority on the history of magic.

== Early life and education ==
Dawes was born in Goole in the West Riding of Yorkshire on 6 July 1925. He developed an interest in magic at the age of 5 when his father and grandfather performed for him during a period of illness. His interest in chemistry developed while at grammar school in Goole, and when he received a gas-mask during World War 2, he decided to test it by producing chlorine gas in the family shed.

Dawes completed his Bachelor of Science with Honours at the University of Leeds in 1946, and his PhD there in 1948.

== Academic career ==
Dawes lectured at the University of Leeds from 1947 to 1950, and at the University of Glasgow from 1951 to 1963. In 1963, he founded the University of Hull's Biochemistry department, and headed it until 1986. From 1963 to 1990 he was Hull's Reckitt Professor of Biochemistry. As director of Hull's biomedical research unit from 1981 to 1992, he led its work on polyhydroxyalkanoate bioplastics, which led to the commercialisation of Biopol by ICI. He was Hull's Dean of Science from 1968 to 1970, and its pro-vice-chancellor from 1977 to 1980. The university granted him emeritus status in 1990, and awarded him an honorary Doctorate of Science in 1992.

Dawes was an editor of the Biochemical Journal from 1958 to 1965 and the Journal of General Microbiology from 1971 to 1976, and served as editor-in-chief of the latter between 1976 and 1981. In 1981 he became Publications Manager of the Federation of European Microbiological Societies, and the following year commenced as Chief Editor of its FEMS Microbiology Letters journal. He retired from those positions in 1990, and subsequently became the society's archivist.

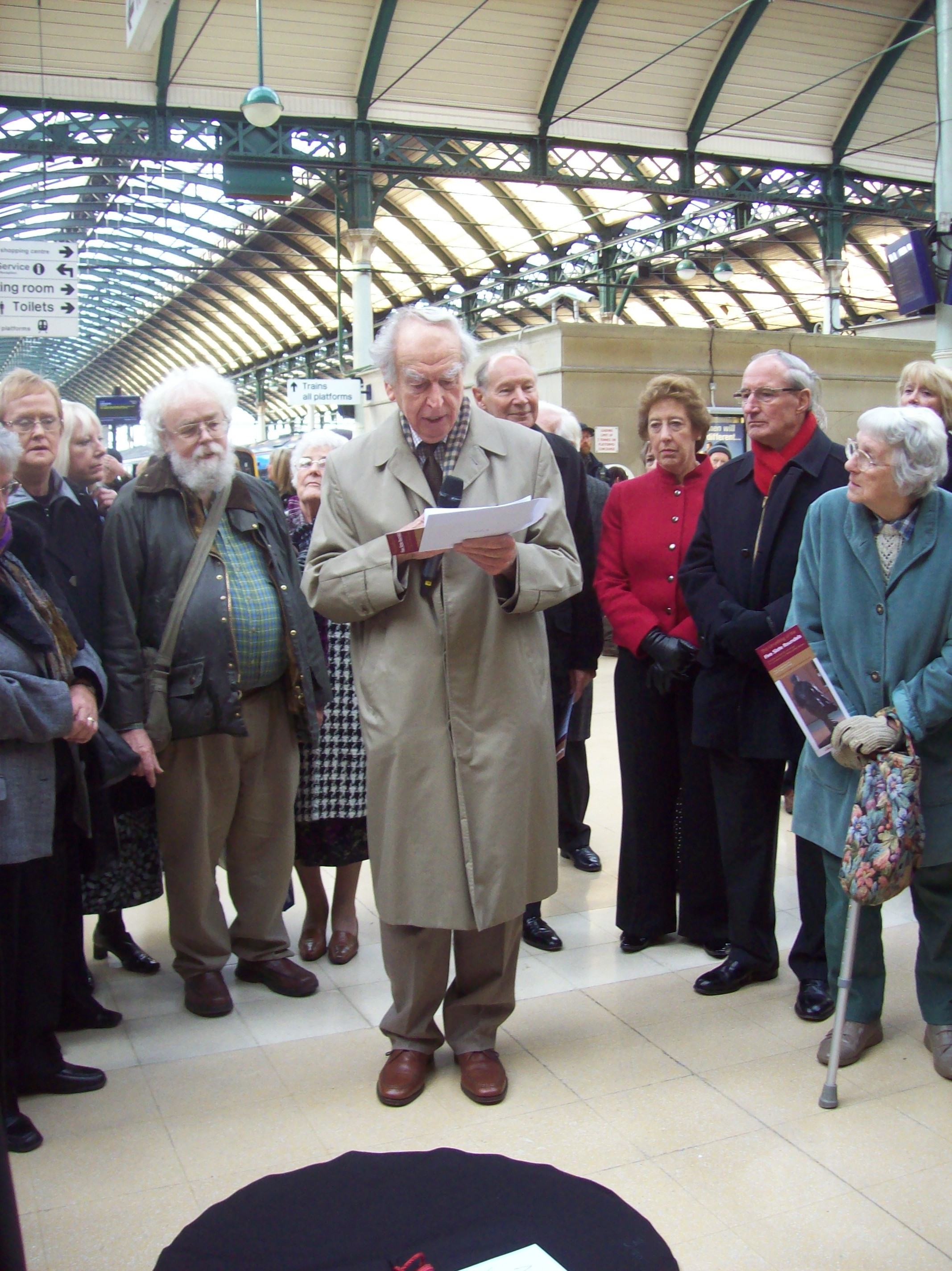
Dawes with the Philip Larkin Society in 2011

Dawes was chairman of the Philip Larkin Society from its founding in 1995, ten years after the death of the poet. They became friends while Larkin was librarian at Hull's Brynmor Jones Library and Dawes was Chairman of the Library Committee (1974 to 1987). On 2 December 2016, after a long campaign, Larkin's memorial was unveiled at Poet's Corner in Westminster Abbey by Dawes and Anthony Thwaite (the Society's president).

=== Works ===
Dawes's 1956 textbook Quantitative Problems in Biochemistry was translated into 6 languages, and as of 2016 remained in print in Japan. Reviews of its 1972 5th edition noted that it had "become a classic for many honours students and teachers of bio-chemistry" with its text "outstanding for being concise yet clear". Its 1980 6th edition was considered as "disappointing" by two reviewers due to its abbreviated content and insufficient coverage of developments in the field, however another reviewer would recommend it without hesitation "as a valuable teaching and reference resource".

His 1986 textbook Microbial Energetics was aimed at the advanced undergraduate, with chapters on "microbial reserve compounds analogous to starch and glycogen of higher cells" deemed "especially authoritative and up-to-date", and with a writing style which "affords considerable pleasure simply by the manner in which the material is presented".

== Magic ==
Dawes was President of the Scottish Conjurers' Association from 1959 to 1963, and edited its magazine from 1958 to 1962. Dawes also edited the magazine for the Scottish Association of Magical Societies (SAMS), the national organisation for magical clubs in Scotland. He was President of the Hull Magicians Circle, and historian for The Magic Circle.

Dawes was a multi-award-winning historian of magic, and is likely to have been the most prolific. His writings, which have been noted for consistently excellent scholarship and engaging prose, include The Great Illusionists, The Encyclopedia of Magic with Arthur Setterington, a number of monographs, and hundreds of articles including (since 1972) his long-running "A Rich Cabinet of Magical Curiosities" monthly column in The Magic Circular. Dawes also wrote several biographical magic books for magicians, among them Charles Bertram: The Court Conjurer (1997), Stodare: The Enigma Variations (1998), and Stanley Collins: Conjuror, Collector and Iconoclast (2002).

Following Dawes's death, his collection of magic memorabilia was auctioned by Potter & Potter Auctions in a series of four sales held between February 2024 and October 2025. The collection included books, posters, prints, ephemera and magic apparatus.

=== With Amy Dawes ===
In magic shows, his wife Amy (born 16 March 1929; née Rogerson) performed both as his assistant and solo. She was a domestic science student during his studies at Leeds, and subsequently became a teacher and ultimately Chief Examiner for Domestic Science for the Joint Matriculation Board. They married on 19 December 1950, and had two sons. The couple developed Only Make-Believe: A Plethora of Prestidigitation, an award-winning stage show, in which they performed as Professor Bluffman and Madame Patrice. Amy Dawes died on 30 December 2014, aged 85.

== Personal life and death ==
Dawes died on 3 March 2023, at the age of 97.

== Awards and honours ==
- 2020 - Honorary Vice President and Honorary Life Member of the Philip Larkin Society.
- 2018 - Allan Slaight Lifetime Achievement award from Magicana.
- 2017 – Gold Medal from The Magic Circle for "exemplary service to the Society or exceptional magical ability or both". Dawes was only the ninth recipient since 1926.
- 2016 – Special Fellowship from the Academy of Magical Arts.
- 2010 – John Nevil Maskelyne Prize (with Steve Short) from the Magic Circle for Entertainer with the Magic Touch about David Nixon.
- 2010 – the Edwin A. Dawes Award for Magic Scholarship was created by The Magic Collectors Association.
- 2006 – FISM award for History and Research.
- 2005 – John Nevil Maskelyne Prize (with Michael Bailey) for Circle Without End about The Magic Circle.
- 2002 – David Devant Award from the Magic Circle for advancing the art of magic or providing outstanding service to magic internationally.
- 1998 – Maskelyne Award from the Magic Circle "for services to British magic".
- 1996 – made Honorary President of the Scottish Association of Magical Societies.
- 1988 – John Nevil Maskelyne Prize for "noteworthy contributions... to the art or literature of magic".
- 1984 – Society of American Magicians Hall of Fame.
- 1984 – Literary Fellowship from the Academy of Magical Arts.
- 1975 – made Honorary Vice President of the Magic Circle.
- 1974 – made Honorary Life President of the Scottish Conjurers Association.
