= International Society for Microbial Ecology =

Scientific society based on microbial ecology

The International Society for Microbial Ecology (ISME) is the principal scientific society for the burgeoning field of microbial ecology and its related disciplines. ISME is a non-profit association and is owner of the International Symposia on Microbial Ecology and also owner of The ISME Journal which is published by Springer Nature (impact factor 2016 9.6 - Reuters Thomson). The ISME Office is based at the Netherlands Institute of Ecology (NIOO-KNAW) in Wageningen, The Netherlands.

The ISME maintains the SeqCode. It is unrelated to the International Committee on Systematics of Prokaryotes, which maintains the Prokaryotic Code.

== Goals ==
ISME fosters the exchange of scientific information by organizing international symposia as well as specific workshops, sponsoring publications, and promoting education and research. ISME provides services to the scientific as well as the wider community. The society enjoys close collaborations with other key scientific organizations, and has established effective scientific interactions in all geographical regions through a network of scientific leaders who serve as ISME National Ambassadors. Anyone with an interest in Microbial Ecology can become a member of ISME.

== History of microbial ecology ==
The important role of microorganisms in natural environments was recognized by leading microbiologists in the late nineteenth century, in particular M. Beijerinck and S. Winogradsky. In his insightful lecture on the role of microbes in general circulation of life (1897) 1), Winogradsky stressed the cardinal role of microorganisms in the circulation of elements on the earth. Discussing the diversity of microorganisms in an environment and microbe-microbe interactions among the populations, he pointed out the specialized functions of various microorganisms in the processes of matter circulation, and the succession of different functional groups in the community in which they work. However, at the era of Winogradsky and Beiuerinck, the only means of discriminating and identifying microorganisms in-situ was the microscopic observation, and the quantitative analysis of the role played by each microorganism in the community was, in most cases, not attained.

In the 20th century, particularly after the Second World War, we have seen extensive developments in the method of isolation, counting and differentiation of microorganisms in environments. The new methodology in taxonomy, like the numerical taxonomy and chemotaxonomy, was soon applied for the identification of environmental isolates. Also, differential staining methods and fluorescent antibody techniques were introduced for in-situ observation of microorganisms. Various new techniques, ranging from the determination of growth and activity of microorganisms in the environments to their isolation and characterization, were assembled in “Modern Methods in the Study of Microbial Ecology” edited by Thomas Rosswall in 1973). The book was based on the meeting held at the Swedish University of Agricultural Sciences, Uppsala, in 1972, and the symposium, preceded the formal ISME, is now known as ISME-0 since R. Guerrero presented at the ISME-63).

The new methods and techniques were proved to be successful for the analysis of microbial community in various fields, soil and water microbiology, food preservation and fermentation, and medical microbiology. The microbiologists working in different fields quickly became aware of the unified concept, microbial ecology. The work of T. Brock "Principles of Microbial Ecology" in 1964) gave a profound impact to the further development of microbial ecology in various countries.

== History ==
On these ground of rapid expansion of microbial ecology, IAMS, International Association of Microbiological Societies, (modified its name to IUMS after 1980) decided to establish ICOME, International Commission of Microbial Ecology, at the 10th International Congress of Microbiology in Mexico City 1970. The ICOME started the next year.

A role stressed for the establishment of ICOME was its active participation in the environmental problems, water and soil pollution and deterioration of environments by human activities. However, the years after Mexico showed that the interest of the Committee was not restricted to the environmental problems, but extended to the central themes of microbial ecology, i.e. cycling of elements in soil and sediments, interactions between microorganisms and plants, animals, and among themselves, the effect of environmental factors on the growth and activities of microorganisms. Moreover, the important role of microorganisms has been recognized by scientists working in many applied fields, formation and fertility of soil, water supplies, fermentation of food and beverages, food preservation, digestive tract and rumen, and even the decay of ancient remains.

== First international symposium ==
The quick and extensive development of the microbial ecology, led to the first International Symposium on Microbial Ecology. The number of participants increased from 380 from 30 countries at the first meeting in Dunedin to 2,000 from 65 countries at ISME-11, Vienna. We could say that the microbial ecology established a definite niche at the scientific world. The scope of topics also broadened. Along with the central, theoretical topics, topics in the applied fields as bioremediation, medical microbiology, food, soil, and water microbiology, entered into the symposium topics. Gastrointestinal microecology first appeared at a symposium session of ISME-3, East Lansing, the topics on fermentation technology and intestinal flora at ISME-4, Ljubljana, and medical microbiology at ISME-5, Kyoto. These topics continued to be favored topics in the subsequent symposia.

ICOME had long functioned on an informal basis, and the principal activity was to hold triennial international symposium. However, the progress and development of microbial ecology was so quick and overwhelming that we had to further intensify the role of ICOME that had been an international commission affiliated to IUMS and IUBS, and establish an independent international organization based on the microbial ecology.

== ISME established ==
There were many obstacles in transferring from a Committee to a Society. However, Prof. J. Tiedje, who acted as the Chairperson of ICOME since 1995, took the active initiative for creating the new Society and consulted with various international organizations and with editors and publishers of journals. He suggested to change the status of ICOME to an International Society of Microbial Ecology (ISME) which has its own journal. He asked the ICOME executive committee to consider and discuss his proposal, and put forward the further steps needed for the establishment of the Society. According to his scheme, the Executive Committee set the framework of the Society and the journal including the scope, editorial board and journal policy.

The proposal for the establishment of the Society was presented and endorsed at ISME-8 in Halifax, Canada, 1998. The foundation of ISME is obviously an important step for future development of microbial ecology, and we owe Prof. Tiedje for his tireless effort and patience during the long process of establishing the Society. The Association founded and registered in East Lancing, MI, USA, and later relocated and established in its registered office is in Geneva.

Meanwhile, Prof. Tiedje consulted with Springer, the publisher of journal “Microbial Ecology”. As a result of the negotiation, Microbial Ecology became affiliated with newly established International Association for Microbial Ecology, the publisher appointing the Editor and Editorial Board of the journal, in consultation with the ISME.

The number of the participants in ISME symposia continued to increase. At the ISME-10 in Cancun, 2004, we had 2000 participants. Microbiologists working in various fields became aware of ecological concepts, and novel methods have evolved very rapidly. Considering the increase in the participants, very fast development of microbial ecology and quickly emerging contemporary problems, the Society determined to hold the symposia in every two years after ISME-10.

== ISME symposia ==
Today, the ISME symposia, organized every two years, are the largest international meetings addressing the wide range of topics in Microbial Ecology.

Previous meetings
Year	Conference	Location	Title
2026	ISME-20	Auckland, New Zealand	-
2024	ISME-19	Cape Town, South Africa	-
2022	ISME-18	Lausanne, Switzerland	-
2018	ISME-17	Leipzig, Germany	Innovations in Microbial Ecology
2016	ISME-16	Montreal, South Canada	Microbial Ecology
2014	ISME-15	Seoul, South Korea	Microbes
2012	ISME-14	Copenhagen, Denmark	The Power of the Small
2010	ISME-13	Seattle, USA	Microbes -Stewards of a Changing Planet
2008	ISME-12	Cairns, Australia	Sustaining the blue planet
2006	ISME-11	Vienna, Austria	The hidden powers-microbial communities in action
2004	ISME-10	Cancun, Mexico	Microbial planet: sub-surface to space
2001	ISME-09	Amsterdam, Netherlands	Interactions in the microbial world
1998	ISME-08	Halifax, Canada	Microbial biosystems: new frontiers
1995	ISME-07	São Paulo, Brazil	Progress in microbial ecology
1992	ISME-06	Barcelona, Spain	Trends in microbial ecology
1989	ISME-05	Kyoto, Japan	Recent advances in microbial ecology
1986	ISME-04	Ljubljana, Slovenia	Perspectives in microbial ecology
1983	ISME-03	East Lansing, USA	Current Perspectives in microbial Ecology
1980	ISME-02	Warwick, UK	Contemporary Microbial Ecology
1977	ISME-01	Dunedin, New Zealand	Microbial Ecology

== The ISME Journal ==
In May 2007 the International Society for Microbial Ecology (ISME) and Nature Publishing Group (NPG) launched a brand new publication: The ISME Journal. Prof. Cohen, who was the President of ISME since 2000, with his successors Prof. S. Kjelleberg and Prof. Hilary Lappin-Scott, made a great effort in founding the journal. The Journal is fully indexed by Medline and all content is now hosted on PubMed.

The current (2015) impact factor of the journal is 9.3 and the full title of the journal, The ISME Journal: Multidisciplinary Journal of Microbial Ecology, reflects the integrated nature of modern microbial ecology, and the goals and scope of the journal manifest this.

Topics of particular interest within the journal’s scope include those listed below:

- I: Microbial population and community ecology
- II: Microbe-microbe and microbe-host interactions
- III: Evolutionary genetics
- IV: Integrated genomics and post-genomics approaches in microbial ecology
- V: Microbial engineering
- VI: Geomicrobiology and microbial contributions to geochemical cycles
- VII: Microbial ecology and functional diversity of natural habitats
- VIII: Microbial ecosystem impacts
