= Cindy Smith =

British engineer

- Education: University College Dublin
- Scientific career
- Workplaces: University of Glasgow; National University of Ireland; University of Exeter; University of Sheffield

Cindy Smith is a British engineer who is a professor of environmental microbiology at the James Watt School of Engineering at the University of Glasgow. Her research looks to develop low cost, sustainable drinking water for rural communities. She was appointed the Royal Academy of Engineering Scottish Water Research Chair on Biofiltration by Biological Design.

== Early life and education ==
Smith studied environmental biology at University College Dublin. She remained there for her doctoral research, where she investigated the bacterial communities associated with marine fish, and developed a biological tag. She was a postdoctoral researcher at the University of Exeter and University of Sheffield, where she studied the molecular ecology of the nitrogen cycle. In 2010. she joined the National University of Ireland as a University Fellow.

== Research and career ==
Smith was appointed a Science Foundation Ireland Starting Investigator at the National University of Ireland, where she studied molecular microbial ecology in coastal bay sediments. She joined the University of Glasgow in 2018. Smith develops new strategies to bring low-cost, sustainable drinking water to rural communities. Water treatment in areas of low population density has high economic and environmental costs, whilst urban communities have centralised water treatment provision. Water treatment for rural communities of one hundred homes are equivalent to services provided for ten thousand. Smith develops low-cost, decentralised filtration technologies (e.g. slow san filtration). She studies the microbial community structures involved in "natural" biogeochemical water treatments.

In 2018, Smith was made a Royal Academy of Engineering Scottish Water Research Chair.

== Selected publications ==
- Cindy J Smith; A Mark Osborn (1 January 2009). "Advantages and limitations of quantitative PCR (Q-PCR)-based approaches in microbial ecology". FEMS Microbiology Ecology. 67 (1): 6–20. doi:10.1111/j.1574-6941.2008.00629.x. ISSN 0168-6496. PMID 19120456. Wikidata Q37361418.
- Cindy J Smith; David B Nedwell; Liang F Dong; A Mark Osborn (30 March 2007). "Diversity and abundance of nitrate reductase genes (narG and napA), nitrite reductase genes (nirS and nrfA), and their transcripts in estuarine sediments". Applied and Environmental Microbiology. 73 (11): 3612–3622. doi:10.1128/aem.02894-06. ISSN 0099-2240. PMC 1932689. PMID 17400770. Wikidata Q33280749.
- Cindy J Smith; Bret S Danilowicz; Adrian K Clear; Fintan Costello; Bryan Wilson; Wim G Meijer (31 May 2005). "T-Align, a web-based tool for comparison of multiple terminal restriction fragment length polymorphism profiles". FEMS Microbiology Ecology. 54 (3): 375–380. doi:10.1016/j.femsec.2005.05.002. ISSN 0168-6496. PMID 16332335. Wikidata Q81582684.
