= Jörg Vogel =

German biologist

- Born: 1 April 1967 (age 59); Cottbus, East Germany
- Citizenship: German
- Awards: VAAM Research award, DGHM Senior Scientist Award, Leibniz Prize
- Scientific career
- Fields: RNA biology
- Workplaces: IMIB
- Doctoral advisor: Thomas Börner, Wolfgang Hess
- Doctoral students: Cynthia Sharma

Jörg Vogel (born 1 April 1967 in Cottbus, East Germany) is a German scientist in the field of RNA biology and microbiology. He is Professor and Director of the Institute for Molecular Infection Biology (IMIB) at the Julius-Maximilians-Universität Würzburg, Germany. Since 2017, he has also headed the Helmholtz-Institut für RNA-basierte Infektionsforschung (Helmholtz Institute for RNA-based Infection Research, HIRI), the world's first research institution to combine RNA and infection research.

Vogel studied biochemistry at the Humboldt University of Berlin and the Imperial College London. After completing his PhD work (1996–1999) he performed postdoctoral research at the Uppsala University, Sweden and was an EMBO fellow at the Hebrew University Jerusalem, Israel. From 2004 to 2010, he headed a research group at the Max Planck Institute for Infection Biology in Berlin (MPIIB). Since 2009, he has been a W3 professor at IMIB and Jörg Hacker’s successor as head of the institute.

Vogel's research activities include small, regulatory RNA molecules, RNA sequencing, RNA localization, as well as microRNA and long, non-coding RNA molecules in infected host cells. Among other achievements, he was a pioneer in the application of high-throughput RNA sequencing for the analysis of bacterial transcriptomes, the study of CRISPR RNA maturation, and interactions between pathogenic bacteria and their hosts. Jörg Vogel has contributed to more than 200 scientific publications including many articles in high impact journals like Nature, Cell and Science.

In 2010, he received the VAAM Research Award, and in 2011, the Senior Scientist Award of the DGHM. In the same year, he was honored with an EMBO membership for his extraordinary research. In 2013, Vogel was elected to the American Academy of Microbiology and the German Academy of Sciences Leopoldina. Since 2015, Jörg Vogel has been continuously listed by Clarivate as a frequently cited researcher in the field of microbiology. Since 2016, he has been a visiting professor at Imperial College London in the Department of Infectious Diseases. Vogel is also one of the awardees of the 2017 Leibniz Prize, the most important research award in Germany. Since 1 January 2021 Jörg Vogel has been President of the European Academy of Microbiology.

== Memberships and awards ==
- 2001 Long-term fellowship from the European Molecular Biology Organization (EMBO). (Member since 2011)
- 2010 Research Award of the Association for General and Applied Microbiology (VAAM)
- 2011 Prize of the German Society for Hygiene and Microbiology
- 2013 Member of the German National Academy of Sciences – Leopoldina
- 2013 Member of the American Academy of Microbiology (ASM)
- 2015 Member of the European Academy of Microbiology
- Since 2016 Visiting professor at the Faculty of Medicine, Imperial College London, UK
- 2019 Feldberg Foundation Prize for Anglo-German Exchange in the Life Sciences
- 2023 Member of the Bavarian Academy of Sciences and Humanities
