= Hilary Lappin-Scott =

British microbiologist (born 1955)

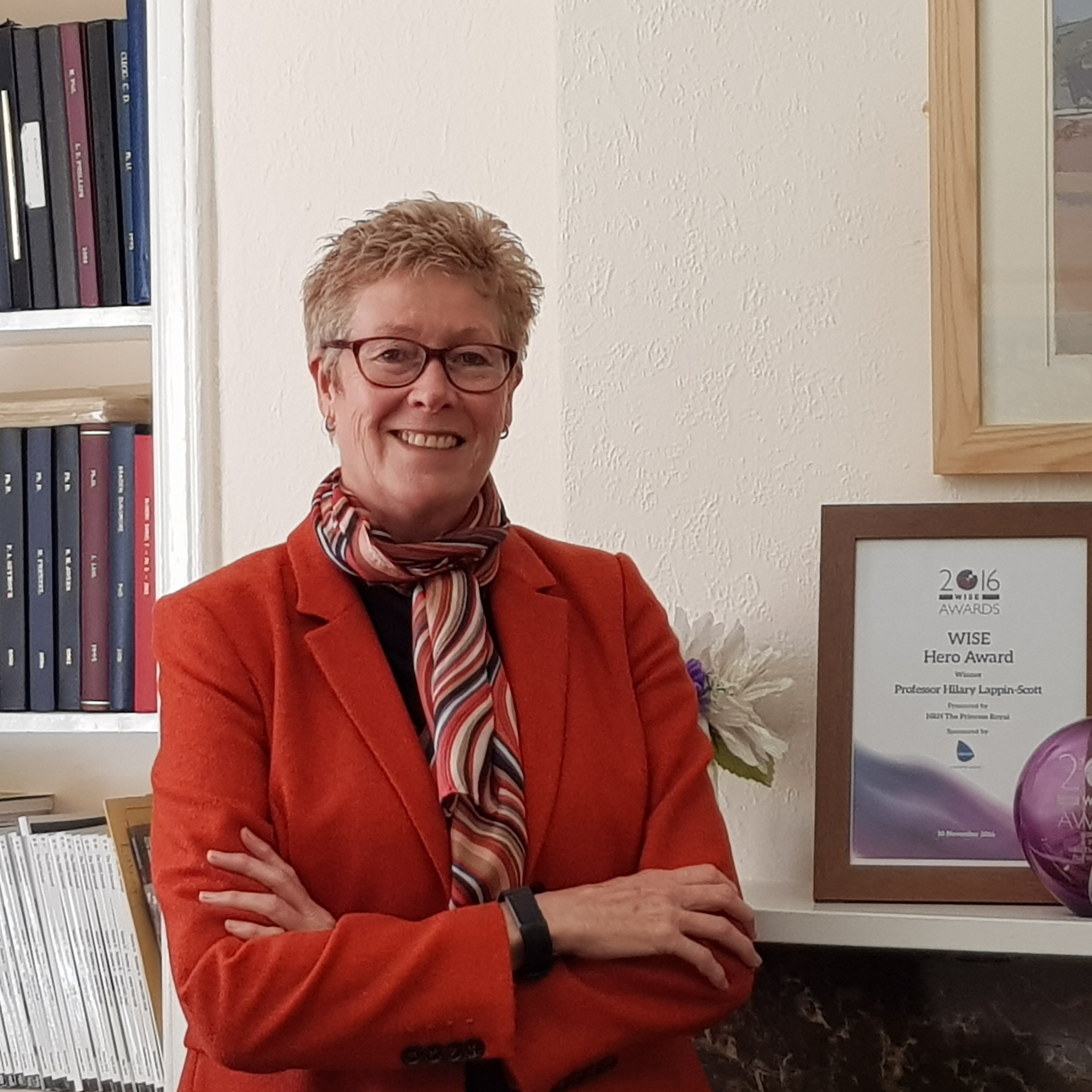
- Born: 23 May 1955 (age 71); Middlesbrough, England
- Education: Warwick University
- Known for: Biofilms
- Spouse: William Lappin-Scott
- Scientific career
- Fields: Microbiologist
- Workplaces: University of Exeter; Swansea University; Cardiff University

Hilary Margaret Lappin-Scott OBE FLS FLSW PFHEA FAAM FRSB (born 1955) is a British microbiologist whose field of research is microbial biofilms. In 2009 Hilary was elected as the second female President of the Society for General Microbiology (SGM) in 70 years and served in this role until 2012. In September 2019 she was elected as President of the Federation of European Microbiological Societies (FEMS), being the first President from the UK.

She has also been President of the International Society for Microbial Ecology (ISME) at the same time, serving two terms in this role (2006-2010). She is currently Pro-Vice Chancellor for Strategic Development and External Relations at Swansea University. Hilary received the honour of Officer of the Order of the British Empire (OBE) in the 2018 New Year Honours list.

== Early life and education ==
Hilary Margaret Lappin is the daughter of Edward Lappin and his wife Thelma (née Consitt). She was born in Middlesbrough, where she attended St Joseph's Infant and Junior School Middlesbrough and St Mary's Convent, Middlesbrough, before reading Environmental Science at the University of Warwick from 1977–80, and completed her PhD at the University of Warwick on herbicide degradation by microbial communities.

== Academic research and career ==
Lappin-Scott started her research career as a postdoctoral work at the University of Calgary, Canada in the group of Bill Costerton, a pioneer in biofilm research. She moved to a faculty position at the University of Exeter in 1990, where she became a personal Chair in Microbiology in 1999. She has supervised 50 students through their PhDs, edited 7 textbooks and published extensively in the area of microbial biofilms.

She left Exeter in 2008 when she was appointed as Pro Vice-Chancellor for Research and Enterprise at Bangor University, Wales, from where she was later appointed in 2010 as Chair in Microbiology and Pro-Vice Chancellor for Strategic Development and External Relations at Swansea University. She finished her term as Pro-Vice Chancellor in 2019 and is currently Honorary Distinguished Professor at Cardiff University. She was a REF2014 panel member and is a REF2021 panel Chair.

Lappin-Scott has a long association with the Microbiology Society. She joined in 1984 and was Convenor of the Environmental Microbiology group in 1996. She was elected onto council in 2000. She served as the Scientific Meetings Officer in 2004, introducing a new Division theme structure for conference planning and establishing the SGM Prize Medal. She was then elected President in 2009, being only the second female President in SGM history, following a gap of over 60 years from the first female President, Marjory Stephenson. She is now an Honorary Member of the Society. More recently she has created and Chairs the Equality and Diversity group of the SGM, which aims to remove barriers to women in microbiology. In 2013 she was chosen to speak at the Soapbox Science event in London which she then brought back to Swansea University to challenge the public's perception of women as scientists and to inspire the next generation of female scientists. Hilary also helped Newcastle University set up events. She presented a TEDx lecture in 2016 entitled "MOVE OVER BOYS: Why we need more girls/women in STEM Careers" about gender equality in science. In 2016 Hilary attracted the British Science Festival to Swansea University, the legacy of which continues in the form of the Swansea Science Festival, an annual event which aims to inspire generations around science and its applications in everyday life.

In 2016 she was awarded a WISE Hero Award by HRH Princess Anne, recognising her work in promoting science, technology, engineering and mathematics (STEM) to girls and women and in 2017 she was awarded a Womenspire Chwarae Teg STEM PIONEER Award, further recognising her role in promoting women in STEM.

Lappin-Scott has also had major roles in the International Society for Microbial Ecology (ISME), serving two terms as president from 2006 to 2010, and she was involved in founding the ISME Journal. She is also a Fellow of the American Academy of Microbiology, the Royal Society of Biology, the Linnean Society, the Learned Society of Wales, and the European Academy of Microbiology. She received an Honorary Doctorate from Örebro University, Sweden, in Feb 2020.

She is the current (2019) President of the Federation of European Microbiological Societies (FEMS).

== Personal life ==
Lappin-Scott is married with one son and two step-daughters.
