= Cynthia Sharma =

German biologist

Cynthia Mira Sharma
- Born: 1979 (age 46–47)
- Education: Heinrich Heine University Düsseldorf; Max Planck Institute for Infection Biology
- Scientific career
- Workplaces: University of Würzburg
- Thesis: Identification of small regulatory RNAs and their targets in bacteria (2009)

Cynthia Mira Sharma (born 1979) is a biologist, who is Chair of Molecular Infection Biology II at the University of Würzburg. Her research focuses on how bacterial pathogens regulate their gene expression to adapt to changing environments or stress conditions.

== Early life and education ==
Sharma attended the Steinbart-Gymnasium in Duisburg. She studied Biology at the Heinrich Heine University Düsseldorf and moved to the Max Planck Institute for Infection Biology for her doctoral studies, during which she studied small regulatory RNAs. She remained at the Max Planck Institute for Infection Biology for a short postdoctoral position with Jörg Vogel. In late 2010, she performed a short postdoctoral research in the United States where she worked alongside Gisela Storz at the National Institutes of Health in Bethesda, MD

== Research and career ==
In 2010 Sharma was recruited to the University of Würzburg's Research Center for Infectious Diseases (ZINF, Zentrum für Infektionsforschung), as an independent young investigator group leader. Her research focuses on bacterial pathogens and how they adapt to their hosts and changing environments. She is particularly interested in how bacteria regulate their gene expression. She is interested in small regulatory RNAs (sRNAs) as well as the proteins that bind RNA, which are important in cell physiology.

During the COVID-19 pandemic, Sharma together with Chase Beisel developed a RNA diagnostic platform to distinguish different respiratory viruses and virus variants based on CRISPR. The test, Leveraging Engineered tracrRNAs and On-target DNAs for PArallel RNA Detection, (LEOPARD), can detect many RNAs at once, offering the potential to identify several disease-related biomarkers.

Sharma was awarded a European Research Council Consolidator Grant in 2022.

== Awards and honours ==
- 2011 Ingrid zu Solms-Naturwissenschaftspreis
- 2012–2015 Postdoc/Young Investigator fellowship of the Daimler-and-Benz Foundation
- 2012–2017 Young Academy member of the Bavarian Academy of Sciences & Humanities
- 2011 Robert-Koch-Postdoktorandenpreis für Mikrobiologie
- 2013 DGHM-Förderpreis (DGHM Young Investigator Award)
- 2014 ESCMID Research Grant
- 2015 German Research Foundation Heinz Maier-Leibnitz Preis
- 2021 Falling Walls Winner in the Category Life Sciences
- 2022 Pettenkofer Prize
- 2022 European Research Council Consolidator Grant
- 2023 VolkswagenStiftung ‘Momentum’-Grant
- 2023 Main prize of the German Society for Hygiene and Microbiology (DGHM)

== Engagement in the research system ==
- 2024 Conference Chair (VAAM) Joint Conference of the VAAM/DGHM, Würzburg, Germany
- 2023 Co-organizer CRISPR Conference 2023, Würzburg, Germany
- Since 2023 Member Scientific Advisory Board (Fachbeirat) BioM GmbH
- 2022 Co-organizer, 71st Mosbacher Colloquium ‘The World of RNAs’, Germany
- 2018 Co-organizer, Symposium of the Sections ‘Microbial Pathogenicity’ (DGHM/VAAM) and ‘Gastrointestinal Infections’ (DGHM), Bad Urach, Germany
- Since 2018 Spokesperson of the Research Center for Infectious Diseases (ZINF), JMU
- 2017–2019 Member of the doctoral graduation commission of the Medical Faculty, JMU
- Since 2017 Steering committee DFG SPP 2002 ‘Small Proteins in Prokaryotes’
- 2014/2016 Co-organizer, EMBO Practical Course on Non-coding RNAs in Infection, Würzburg, Germany
- 2016 Co-organizer, Workshop ‘Sensory and Regulatory RNAs in Prokaryotes’, Munich, Germany
- 2015–2021 board member of the Section ‘Gastrointestinal Infections’ of the DGHM
- 2015–2019 Member of Faculty Opinions Section ‘Bacterial Infections’
- 2015 Organizer, Workshop ‘High-Throughput & Single Cell Approaches in Infection Biology’, Munich, Germany
- 2014 Organizer, 3rd Mol Micro Meeting (M3W3), Würzburg
- 2012 Co-organizer of the 2nd Mol Micro Meeting, Würzburg, Germany

== Selected publications ==
- 2014 Organizer, 3rd Mol Micro Meeting (M3W3), Würzburg
- 2012 Co-organizer of the 2nd Mol Micro Meeting, Würzburg, Germany

== Selected publications ==
- Pernitzsch, Sandy R.; Alzheimer, Mona; Bremer, Belinda U.; Robbe-Saule, Marie; De Reuse, Hilde; Sharma, Cynthia M. (2021). "Small RNA mediated gradual control of lipopolysaccharide biosynthesis affects antibiotic resistance in Helicobacter pylori". Nature Communications. 12 (1) 4433. Bibcode:2021NatCo..12.4433P. doi:10.1038/s41467-021-24689-2. PMC 8295292. PMID 34290242.
- Jiao, Chunlei; Sharma, Sahil; Dugar, Gaurav; Peeck, Natalia L.; Bischler, Thorsten; Wimmer, Franziska; Yu, Yanying; Barquist, Lars; Schoen, Christoph; Kurzai, Oliver; Sharma, Cynthia M.; Beisel, Chase L. (2021). "Noncanonical crRNAs derived from host transcripts enable multiplexable RNA detection by Cas9". Science. 372 (6545): 941–948. doi:10.1126/science.abe7106. PMC 8224270. PMID 33906967.
- Eisenbart, Sara K.; Alzheimer, Mona; Pernitzsch, Sandy R.; Dietrich, Sascha; Stahl, Stephanie; Sharma, Cynthia M. (2020). "A Repeat-Associated Small RNA Controls the Major Virulence Factors of Helicobacter pylori". Molecular Cell. 80 (2): 210–226.e7. doi:10.1016/j.molcel.2020.09.009. PMID 33002424.
- Alzheimer, Mona; Svensson, Sarah L.; König, Fabian; Schweinlin, Matthias; Metzger, Marco; Walles, Heike; Sharma, Cynthia M. (2020). "A three-dimensional intestinal tissue model reveals factors and small regulatory RNAs important for colonization with Campylobacter jejuni". PLOS Pathogens. 16 (2) e1008304. doi:10.1371/journal.ppat.1008304. PMC 7048300. PMID 32069333.
- Dugar, Gaurav; Leenay, Ryan T.; Eisenbart, Sara K.; Bischler, Thorsten; Aul, Belinda U.; Beisel, Chase L.; Sharma, Cynthia M. (2018). "CRISPR RNA-Dependent Binding and Cleavage of Endogenous RNAs by the Campylobacter jejuni Cas9". Molecular Cell. 69 (5): 893–905.e7. doi:10.1016/j.molcel.2018.01.032. PMC 5859949. PMID 29499139.
- Dugar, Gaurav; Svensson, Sarah L.; Bischler, Thorsten; Wäldchen, Sina; Reinhardt, Richard; Sauer, Markus; Sharma, Cynthia M. (2016). "The CsrA-FliW network controls polar localization of the dual-function flagellin mRNA in Campylobacter jejuni". Nature Communications. 7 11667. Bibcode:2016NatCo...711667D. doi:10.1038/ncomms11667. PMC 4894983. PMID 27229370.
- Pernitzsch, Sandy R.; Tirier, Stephan M.; Beier, Dagmar; Sharma, Cynthia M. (2014). "A variable homopolymeric G-repeat defines small RNA-mediated posttranscriptional regulation of a chemotaxis receptor in Helicobacter pylori". Proceedings of the National Academy of Sciences. 111 (4): E501-10. Bibcode:2014PNAS..111E.501P. doi:10.1073/pnas.1315152111. PMC 3910625. PMID 24474799.
- Dugar, Gaurav; Herbig, Alexander; Förstner, Konrad U.; Heidrich, Nadja; Reinhardt, Richard; Nieselt, Kay; Sharma, Cynthia M. (2013). "High-Resolution Transcriptome Maps Reveal Strain-Specific Regulatory Features of Multiple Campylobacter jejuni Isolates". PLOS Genetics. 9 (5) e1003495. doi:10.1371/journal.pgen.1003495. PMC 3656092. PMID 23696746.
- Deltcheva, Elitza; Chylinski, Krzysztof; Sharma, Cynthia M.; Gonzales, Karine; Chao, Yanjie; Pirzada, Zaid A.; Eckert, Maria R.; Vogel, Jörg; Charpentier, Emmanuelle (2011). "CRISPR RNA maturation by trans-encoded small RNA and host factor RNase III". Nature. 471 (7340): 602–607. Bibcode:2011Natur.471..602D. doi:10.1038/nature09886. PMC 3070239. PMID 21455174.
- Sharma, Cynthia M.; Hoffmann, Steve; Darfeuille, Fabien; Reignier, Jérémy; Findeiß, Sven; Sittka, Alexandra; Chabas, Sandrine; Reiche, Kristin; Hackermüller, Jörg; Reinhardt, Richard; Stadler, Peter F.; Vogel, Jörg (2010). "The primary transcriptome of the major human pathogen Helicobacter pylori". Nature. 464 (7286): 250–255. Bibcode:2010Natur.464..250S. doi:10.1038/nature08756. PMID 20164839.
