= Alain Filloux =

French microbiologist

Alain Ange-Marie Filloux
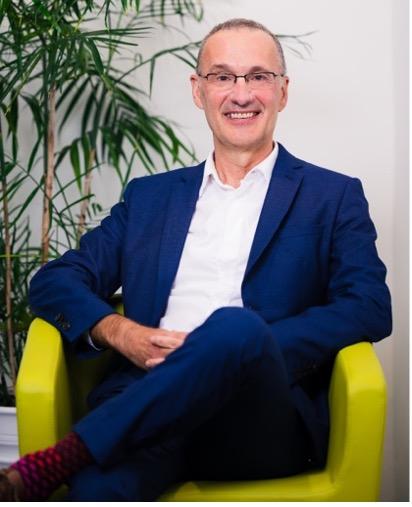
- Born: May 1, 1961 (age 65)
- Education: Universite d'Aix-Marseille II
- Scientific career
- Fields: Microbiology; Molecular biology; Bacterial genetics
- Workplaces: Utrecht University; French National Centre for Scientific Research; Imperial College London; Nanyang Technological University
- Thesis: Etude de la secrétion des protéines chez Pseudomonas aeruginosa (1988)
- Doctoral advisor: Professor Andrée Lazdunski

Alain Ange-Marie Filloux (born May 1, 1961) is a French/British microbiologist who is the director of the Singapore Centre for Environmental Life Sciences Engineering (SCELSE) and a professor of molecular microbiology at Nanyang Technological University, Singapore. He holds joint appointments at both the School of Biological Sciences and the Lee Kong Chian School of Medicine at NTU. His research looks at the chronic infection of Pseudomonas aeruginosa, a Gram-negative bacterium that causes nosocomial infections in people who are immunocompromised and a deadly threat for cystic fibrosis patients. He is a visiting professor at Imperial College London.

== Education ==
Filloux was a graduate student at Universite d'Aix-Marseille II, where he started to study protein secretion in Pseudomonas aeruginosa. He obtained his doctorate under the supervision of Andrée Lazdunski in 1988 and with the support of a European Union fellowship moved to the Netherlands for his postdoctoral research, where he joined Utrecht University and the laboratory of Dr Jan Tommassen.

== Research and career ==
In 1990, Filloux became assistant professor at Utrecht University, and continued to explore protein secretion in Gram-negative bacteria. He identified that a common mechanism is responsible for the transport of macromolecules across the outer membrane of Gram-negative bacteria that includes Pseudomonas aeruginosa. In particular he co-discovered what is now called the type II secretion system (T2SS). This finding contributed to understanding protein secretion systems in Gram-negative bacteria, which are essential to their pathogenicity.

In 1994, Filloux was appointed to the French National Centre for Scientific Research (CNRS) as a research associate (CR1). In 2001, he became research director and headed his laboratory on "Molecular Microbiology and Pathogenicity in Pseudomonads". Filloux became director of the CNRS research unit Laboratoire d’Ingénierie des Systèmes Macromoléculaires in 2003. Filloux became increasingly interested in the ability that allows bacteria to live on a surface or tissues as a resilient community known as biofilm. Biofilms are intrinsically resistant to eradication by antibiotics or the immune system, and present a major issue in healthcare. He used bacterial genetics to identify a series of molecular determinants involved in the biofilm formation process, notably extracellular appendages, or fimbriae, he called Cup. Working with Stephen Lory from Harvard Medical School, Filloux discovered a regulatory switch, LadS, which allows Pseudomonas aeruginosa to transition from planktonic to a biofilm.

In 2007 he joined Imperial College London as professor and chair of the Centre for Molecular Bacteriology and Infection. Filloux continued to work on protein secretion systems, but concentrated his research on the so-called Type VI secretion system (T6SS), a molecular crossbow that delivers toxins in competing bacterial competitors and kills them. He discovered many T6SS toxins in Pseudomonas aeruginosa and described how these could be transported in target bacteria notably by being placed at the tip of the molecular arrowhead.

One such example is VgrG2b, which contains a metallopeptidase domain targeting, in the prey bacteria, proteins involved in cell wall integrity and cell division. Bacterial preys will then collapse, as they do for example when treated with Βeta-lactam antibiotics. Filloux also carried on studying biofilms, and gained interest in a central switch which involves the universal second messenger cyclic-di-GMP. It was known that high levels of c-di-GMP in bacterial cells turns on biofilm development, and Filloux showed that concomitantly high c-di-GMP levels turned on the T6SS. This suggested that the T6SS is put in place when cells enter a phase allowing polymicrobial communities to establish and is thus prepared to eliminate foes.

While continuing to study protein secretion and biofilm formation, Filloux started to investigate antibiotic resistance. He collaborated with Gerald Larrouy-Maumus on the development of a protocol for rapid antibiotic resistance screening using mass spectrometry.

In 2022, Filloux was appointed as the centre director of SCELSE in Singapore, where he continues to explore biofilm formation and bacterial secretion systems.

== Membership and editorial boards ==
Filloux has been an editor for several scientific journals. He was editor-in-chief for FEMS Microbiology Reviews (2013-2019) and for npj Biolfilms and Microbiomes (2018-2022), which is part of the Nature Partner Journals series.

Filloux has held scientific administrative positions including membership of the BBSRC - Research Grants Committee B (2009-2011), the MRC Infection and immunity board (2016-2020), the FWO panel Medical Microbiology (2017-2023). He was also chair of the ANR scientific committee on microbiology, immunology and infection (2008-2011 and 2014-2018).

== Awards and honours ==
- 2004 Fondation Bettencourt Schueller Coup d’élan
- 2006 Jacques Piraud award for research on infectious diseases
- 2007 Royal Society Wolfson Research Merit Award
- 2016 Elected to the European Academy of Microbiology
- 2017 Elected a fellow of the American Academy of Microbiology
- 2019 Elected a fellow of the Royal Society of Biology

== Selected academic works ==
=== Publications ===
- Fecht, S.; Paracuellos, P.; Subramoni, S.; Tan, C. A. Z.; Ilangovan, A.; Costa, T. R. D.; Filloux, A. (2024-05-20). "Functionality of chimeric TssA proteins in the type VI secretion system reveals sheath docking specificity within their N-terminal domains". Nature Communications. 15 (1): 4283. doi:10.1038/s41467-024-48487-8. PMID 38769318.
- Rudzite, M.; Subramoni, S.; Endres, R. G.; Filloux, A. (2023-05-30). "Effectiveness of Pseudomonas aeruginosa type VI secretion system relies on toxin potency and type IV pili-dependent interaction". PLOS Pathogens. 19 (5): e1011428. doi:10.1371/journal.ppat.1011428. PMID 37253075.
- Nolan, L. M.; Cain, A. K.; Clamens, T.; Furniss, R. C. D.; Manoli, E.; Sainz-Polo, M. A.; Dougan, G.; Albesa-Jové, D.; Parkhill, J.; Mavridou, D. A. I.; Filloux, A. (2021-09). "Identification of Tse8 as a Type VI secretion system toxin from Pseudomonas aeruginosa that targets the bacterial transamidosome to inhibit protein synthesis in prey cells". Nature Microbiology. 6 (9): 1199–1210. doi:10.1038/s41564-021-00950-8. PMID 34413503.
- Bernal, P.; Furniss, R. C. D.; Fecht, S.; Leung, R. C. Y.; Spiga, L.; Mavridou, D. A. I.; Filloux, A. (2021-02-16). "A novel stabilization mechanism for the type VI secretion system sheath". Proceedings of the National Academy of Sciences of the United States of America. 118 (7): e2008500118. doi:10.1073/pnas.2008500118. PMID 33558227.
- Wood, T. E.; Howard, S. A.; Förster, A.; Nolan, L. M.; Manoli, E.; Bullen, N. P.; Yau, H. C. L.; Hachani, A.; Hayward, R. D.; Whitney, J. C.; Vollmer, W.; Freemont, P. S.; Filloux, A. (2019-10-01). "The Pseudomonas aeruginosa T6SS Delivers a Periplasmic Toxin that Disrupts Bacterial Cell Morphology". Cell Reports. 29 (1): 187–201.e7. doi:10.1016/j.celrep.2019.08.094. PMID 31577948.
- Valentini, M.; Filloux, A. (2019-09-08). "Multiple Roles of c-di-GMP Signaling in Bacterial Pathogenesis". Annual Review of Microbiology. 73: 387–406. doi:10.1146/annurev-micro-020518-115555. PMID 31500536.
- Pissaridou, P.; Allsopp, L. P.; Wettstadt, S.; Howard, S. A.; Mavridou, D. A. I.; Filloux, A. (2018-12-04). "The Pseudomonas aeruginosa T6SS-VgrG1b spike is topped by a PAAR protein eliciting DNA damage to bacterial competitors". Proceedings of the National Academy of Sciences of the United States of America. 115 (49): 12519–12524. doi:10.1073/pnas.1814181115. PMID 30455305.
- Dortet, L.; Lombardi, C.; Cretin, F.; Dessen, A.; Filloux, A. (2018-03). "Pore-forming activity of the Pseudomonas aeruginosa type III secretion system translocon alters the host epigenome". Nature Microbiology. 3 (3): 378–386. doi:10.1038/s41564-018-0109-7. PMID 29403015.
- Valentini, M.; Gonzalez, D.; Mavridou, D. A.; Filloux, A. (2018-02). "Lifestyle transitions and adaptive pathogenesis of Pseudomonas aeruginosa". Current Opinion in Microbiology. 41: 15–20. doi:10.1016/j.mib.2017.11.006. PMID 29166621.
- Allsopp, L. P.; Wood, T. E.; Howard, S. A.; Maggiorelli, F.; Nolan, L. M.; Wettstadt, S.; Filloux, A. (2017-07-18). "RsmA and AmrZ orchestrate the assembly of all three type VI secretion systems in Pseudomonas aeruginosa". Proceedings of the National Academy of Sciences of the United States of America. 114 (29): 7707–7712. doi:10.1073/pnas.1700286114. PMID 28673999.
- McCarthy, R. R.; Mazon-Moya, M. J.; Moscoso, J. A.; Hao, Y.; Lam, J. S.; Bordi, C.; Mostowy, S.; Filloux, A. (2017-03-06). "Cyclic-di-GMP regulates lipopolysaccharide modification and contributes to Pseudomonas aeruginosa immune evasion". Nature Microbiology. 2: 17027. doi:10.1038/nmicrobiol.2017.27. PMID 28263305.
- Valentini, M.; Laventie, B. J.; Moscoso, J.; Jenal, U.; Filloux, A. (2016-10-28). "The Diguanylate Cyclase HsbD Intersects with the HptB Regulatory Cascade to Control Pseudomonas aeruginosa Biofilm and Motility". PLOS Genetics. 12 (10): e1006354. doi:10.1371/journal.pgen.1006354. PMID 27792789.
- Planamente, S.; Salih, O.; Manoli, E.; Albesa-Jové, D.; Freemont, P. S.; Filloux, A. (2016-08-01). "TssA forms a gp6-like ring attached to the type VI secretion sheath". EMBO Journal. 35 (15): 1613–1627. doi:10.15252/embj.201694024. PMID 27288401.
- Valentini, M.; Filloux, A. (2016-06-10). "Biofilms and Cyclic di-GMP (c-di-GMP) Signaling: Lessons from Pseudomonas aeruginosa and Other Bacteria". Journal of Biological Chemistry. 291 (24): 12547–12555. doi:10.1074/jbc.R115.711507. PMID 27129226.
- Hachani, A.; Wood, T. E.; Filloux, A. (2016-02). "Type VI secretion and anti-host effectors". Current Opinion in Microbiology. 29: 81–93. doi:10.1016/j.mib.2015.11.006. Epub 2015 Dec 24. PMID 26722980.
- Hachani, A.; Allsopp, L. P.; Oduko, Y.; Filloux, A. (2014-06-20). "The VgrG proteins are 'à la carte' delivery systems for bacterial type VI effectors". Journal of Biological Chemistry. 289 (25): 17872–17884. doi:10.1074/jbc.M114.563429. Epub 2014 May 2. PMID 24794869.
- Filloux, A. (2013-08-15). "Microbiology: a weapon for bacterial warfare". Nature. 500 (7462): 284–285. doi:10.1038/nature12545. Epub 2013 Aug 7. PMID 23925115.
- Moscoso, J. A.; Mikkelsen, H.; Heeb, S.; Williams, P.; Filloux, A. (2011-12). "The Pseudomonas aeruginosa sensor RetS switches type III and type VI secretion via c-di-GMP signalling". Environmental Microbiology. 13 (12): 3128–3138. doi:10.1111/j.1462-2920.2011.02595.x. Epub 2011 Sep 29. PMID 21955777.
- Garvis, S.; Munder, A.; Ball, G.; de Bentzmann, S.; Wiehlmann, L.; Ewbank, J. J.; Tümmler, B.; Filloux, A. (2009-08). "Caenorhabditis elegans semi-automated liquid screen reveals a specialized role for the chemotaxis gene cheB2 in Pseudomonas aeruginosa virulence". PLoS Pathogens. 5 (8): e1000540. doi:10.1371/journal.ppat.1000540. Epub 2009 Aug 7. PMID 19662168.
- Filloux, A. (2004-11-11). "The underlying mechanisms of type II protein secretion". Biochimica et Biophysica Acta. 1694(1-3): 163–179. doi:10.1016/j.bbamcr.2004.05.003. PMID 15546665.
- Voulhoux, R.; Ball, G.; Ize, B.; Vasil, M. L.; Lazdunski, A.; Wu, L. F.; Filloux, A. (2001-12-03). "Involvement of the twin-arginine translocation system in protein secretion via the type II pathway". EMBO Journal. 20 (23): 6735–6741. doi:10.1093/emboj/20.23.6735. PMID 11726509.
- Ventre, Isabelle; Goodman, Andrew L.; Vallet-Gely, Isabelle; Vasseur, Perrine; Soscia, Chantal; Molin, Søren; Bleves, Sophie; Lazdunski, Andrée; Lory, Stephen; Filloux, Alain (2006-01-03). "Multiple sensors control reciprocal expression of Pseudomonas aeruginosa regulatory RNA and virulence genes". Proceedings of the National Academy of Sciences. 103 (1): 171–176. Bibcode:2006PNAS..103..171V. doi:10.1073/pnas.0507407103. ISSN 0027-8424. PMC 1324988. PMID 16373506.
- Filloux, Alain; Hachani, Abderrahman; Bleves, Sophie (2008-06-01). "The bacterial type VI secretion machine: yet another player for protein transport across membranes". Microbiology. 154 (6): 1570–1583. doi:10.1099/mic.0.2008/016840-0. hdl:10044/1/40505. ISSN 1350-0872. PMID 18524912.
- Vallet, Isabelle; Olson, John W.; Lory, Stephen; Lazdunski, Andrée; Filloux, Alain (2001-06-05). "The chaperone/usher pathways of Pseudomonas aeruginosa: Identification of fimbrial gene clusters (cup) and their involvement in biofilm formation". Proceedings of the National Academy of Sciences. 98 (12): 6911–6916. Bibcode:2001PNAS...98.6911V. doi:10.1073/pnas.111551898. ISSN 0027-8424. PMC 34452. PMID 11381121.

=== Books ===
- Filloux, Alain; Ramos, Juan-Luis (2014). Pseudomonas Methods and Protocols. Springer. ISBN 978-1-4939-0473-0. OCLC 1058867858.
