= Pathogens and Disease =

- Discipline: Microbiology, pathogens
- Language: English
- Edited by: Wilhelmina Huston, Alfredo Garzino-Demo, Jörn Coers

Publication details
- Former name(s): FEMS Microbiology Immunology, FEMS Immunology and Medical Microbiology
- History: 1993–present
- Publisher: Oxford University Press
- Frequency: 9/year
- Open access: Hybrid
- Impact factor: 3.3 (2022)

Standard abbreviations
- ISO 4: Pathog. Dis.

Indexing
- Pathogens and Disease
- ISSN: 2049-632X (print); 2049-632X (web)
- LCCN: 200125651
- OCLC no.: 823140442
- FEMS Immunology and Medical Microbiology
- CODEN: FIMIEV
- ISSN: 0928-8244 (print); 1574-695X (web)
- OCLC no.: 27447797
- FEMS Microbiology Immunology
- CODEN: FMIMEH
- ISSN: 0920-8534
- OCLC no.: 17515756

Links
- Journal homepage

Pathogens and Disease is a peer-reviewed scientific journal covering research on all pathogens (eukaryotes, prokaryotes, and viruses, including zoonotic pathogens). It was originally established in 1988 as FEMS Microbiology Immunology when it split from FEMS Microbiology Letters. It was renamed FEMS Immunology and Medical Microbiology in 1993, and obtained its current name in 2013.

The journal is published by Oxford University Press on behalf of the Federation of European Microbiological Societies. The current editors-in-chief are Wilhelmina Huston, Alfredo Garzino-Demo, and Jörn Coers.

== Abstracting and indexing ==
The journal is indexed and abstracted in:

- Academic Search Premier
- BIOSIS Previews
- Chemical Abstracts Service
- Embase
- Food Science & Technology Abstracts
- MEDLINE
- Science Citation Index Expanded
- Scopus

According to the Journal Citation Reports, the journal has a 2020 impact factor of 3.166, ranking it 81st out of 137 journals in the category "Microbiology"; 112th out of 162 journals in "Immunology"; and 55th out of 92 journals in "Infectious Diseases".
