= Melanie Blokesch =

German microbiologist

Professor Melanie Blokesch
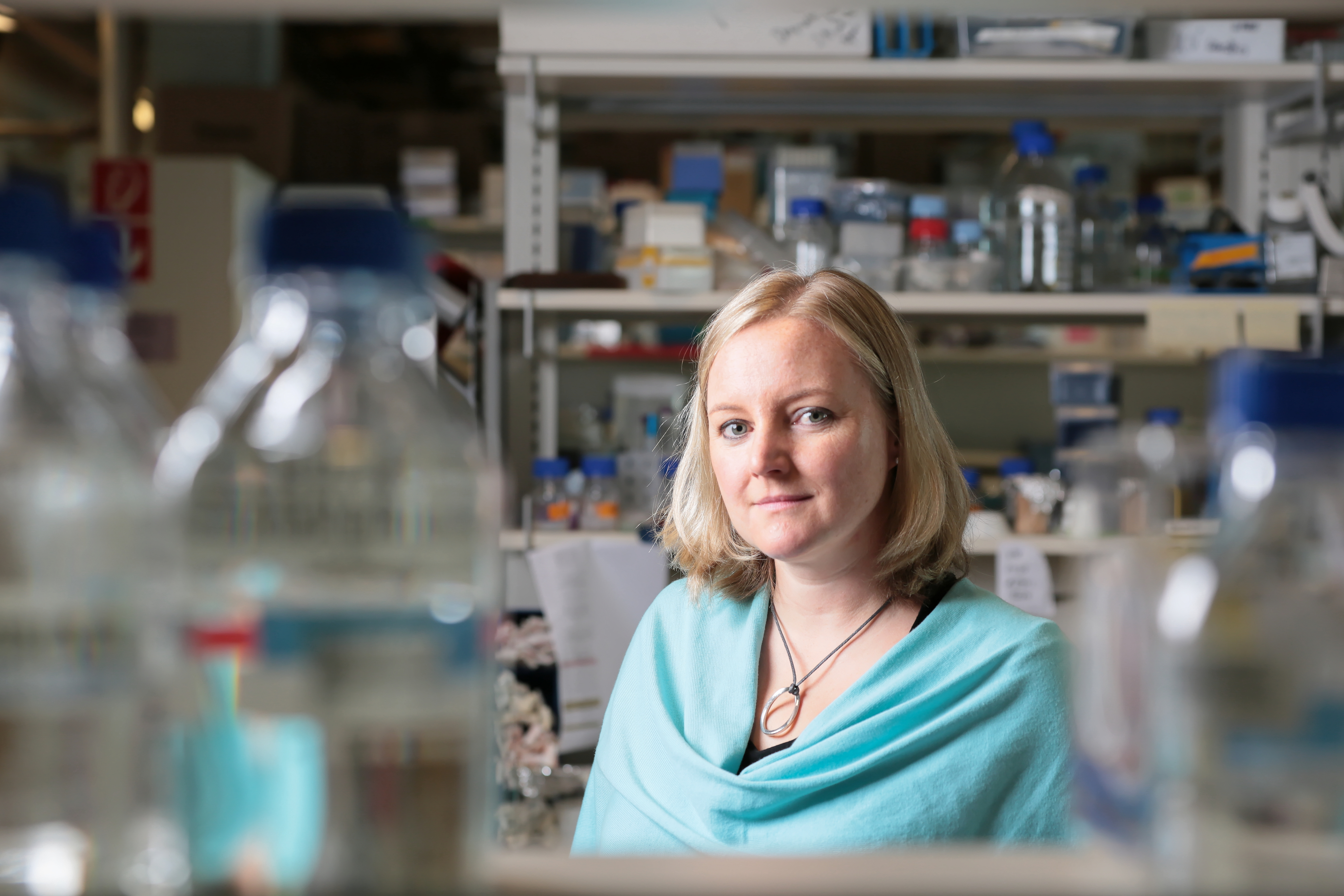
- Melanie Blokesch in 2020
- Born: 1976 (age 49–50)
- Citizenship: Germany

Academic background
- Doctoral advisor: August Böck
- Other advisor: Gary K. Schoolnik

Academic work
- Discipline: Biology
- Sub-discipline: Microbiology
- Institutions: École Polytechnique Fédérale de Lausanne (EPFL)
- Main interests: Microbiology; V. cholerae Cholera; Horizontal gene transfer (HGT)
- Website: https://www.epfl.ch/labs/blokesch-lab/

Melanie Blokesch (born 1976) is a German microbiologist. Her research focuses on Vibrio cholerae, the bacterium causing cholera. She is a professor of life sciences at École Polytechnique Fédérale de Lausanne (EPFL), where she heads the Laboratory of Molecular Microbiology.

== Career ==
Blokesch studied biology and microbiology at LMU Munich where she received her diploma in 2000. She then joined August Böck's laboratory as a doctoral student and in 2004, graduated with her PhD awarded summa cum laude on "[NiFe]-Hydrogenases of Escherichia coli: Functions of Proteins involved in Metal Center Assembly". In 2005, she went to work as postdoctoral research fellow with Gary K. Schoolnik in the Division of Infectious Diseases and Geographic Medicine at Stanford University. In 2009, she became Assistant Professor in the Global Health Institute at École Polytechnique Fédérale de Lausanne, where she was promoted as Associate Professor in 2016 and Full Professor in 2021. Since 2009, she has been the director of the Laboratory of Molecular Microbiology.

== Research ==
Blokesch's research group investigates the pathogenic bacterium Vibrio cholerae that afflicts humans and has been responsible for major pandemics throughout history. She is interested how the natural environment of the bacterium is linked to its potential to evolve into a human pathogen.

Her group studies how V. cholerae acquires new capabilities via horizontal gene transfer (HGT). They found the pilous fraction of the DNA-uptake machinery also enables the adherence to chitinous surfaces, such as exoskeleton of arthropods, also under conditions of water currents. Further they discovered that V. cholerae actively forages for DNA by killing neighboring cells via type VI secretion system (T6SS) while being able to spare kin cells. Thereby DNA chunks even beyond the length of 150kb are taken up and exchanged against regions of the bacterium's genome. They started also working on the HGT capabilities of Acinetobacter baumannii, another human pathogen, known for frequently being resistant to a variety of antibiotics, and mostly associated with high infection rates in hospital settings.

In order to better understand the interaction of host and pathogen, they also investigate routes of transmission in endemic cholera hot-spots. They discovered several virulence factors that might be used by V. cholerae in a Trojan horse-like manner to replicate in aquatic amoebae, and thereby could facilitate transmission.

The research of Blokesch and her group has been featured in international news outlets such as La Razón, Radio Télévision Suisse, The Times of India, National Geographic Magazine and Deutschlandfunk.

== Distinctions ==
Blokesch was elected as a member of the European Molecular Biology Organization (EMBO) in 2019 and of the European Academy of Microbiology in 2018. In 2017, she was selected among 25 life changing women ("25 Frauen, deren Erfindungen unser Leben verändern") by four German news outlets (Edition F, ZEIT online, Handelsblatt and Gründerszene). She has been editor of variety of scientific journals such as eLife, PLoS Genetics, Molecular Microbiology, and PLoS Biology. Since 2019 she has been a member of the Swiss National Research Council, the Specialised Committee Interdisciplinarity and the Sinergia Evaluation Committee of the Swiss National Science Foundation.

== Selected publications ==
- Sawers, R. Gary; Blokesch, Melanie; Böck, August (2004). "Anaerobic Formate and Hydrogen Metabolism". EcoSal Plus. 1 (1). doi:10.1128/ecosalplus.3.5.4. PMC 11575713. PMID 26443350.
- Meibom, K. L.; Blokesch, M.; Dolganov, N. A.; Wu, C. Y.; Schoolnik, G. K. (2005). "Chitin Induces Natural Competence in Vibrio cholerae". Science. 310 (5755): 1824–1827. Bibcode:2005Sci...310.1824M. doi:10.1126/science.1120096. PMID 16357262. S2CID 31153549.
- Böck, August; King, Paul W.; Blokesch, Melanie; Posewitz, Matthew C. (2006). "Maturation of Hydrogenases". Advances in Microbial Physiology Volume 51. Advances in Microbial Physiology. pp. 1–225. doi:10.1016/S0065-2911(06)51001-X. ISBN 978-0-12-027751-3. PMID 17091562.
- Borgeaud, Sandrine; Metzger, Lisa C.; Scrignari, Tiziana; Blokesch, Melanie (2015). "The type VI secretion system of Vibrio choleraefosters horizontal gene transfer". Science. 347 (6217): 63–67. Bibcode:2015Sci...347...63B. doi:10.1126/science.1260064. PMID 25554784. S2CID 20297980.
- Blokesch, Melanie; Schoolnik, Gary K. (2007). "Serogroup Conversion of Vibrio cholerae in Aquatic Reservoirs". PLOS Pathogens. 3 (6) e81. doi:10.1371/journal.ppat.0030081. PMC 1891326. PMID 17559304.
- Seitz, Patrick; Blokesch, Melanie (2013). "Cues and regulatory pathways involved in natural competence and transformation in pathogenic and environmental Gram-negative bacteria". FEMS Microbiology Reviews. 37 (3): 336–363. doi:10.1111/j.1574-6976.2012.00353.x. PMID 22928673.
- Rinaldo, A.; Bertuzzo, E.; Mari, L.; Righetto, L.; Blokesch, M.; Gatto, M.; Casagrandi, R.; Murray, M.; Vesenbeckh, S. M.; Rodriguez-Iturbe, I. (2012). "Reassessment of the 2010-2011 Haiti cholera outbreak and rainfall-driven multiseason projections". Proceedings of the National Academy of Sciences. 109 (17): 6602–6607. Bibcode:2012PNAS..109.6602R. doi:10.1073/pnas.1203333109. PMC 3340092. PMID 22505737.
