= Lorenz Hiltner =

German biologist (1862–1923)

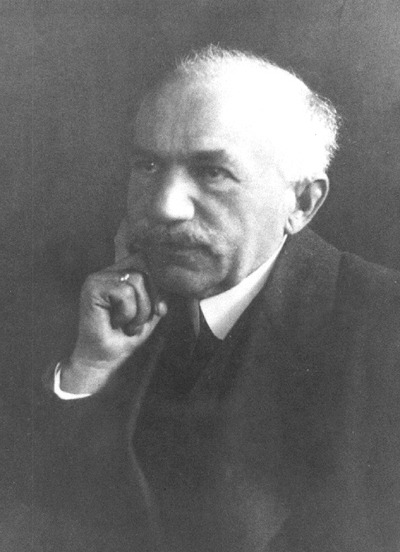
Lorenz Hiltner

Lorenz Hiltner (November 30, 1862 – June 6, 1923), born in Neumarkt in the Kingdom of Bavaria and died in Munich, was a German agronomist and microbiologist, known for developing the concept of the rhizosphere and for pioneering the development of the field of microbial ecology.

== Personal life ==
Lorenz Hiltner was born on November 30, 1862, in Neumarkt. After completing his primary and secondary education in Neumarkt, he received a scholarship to study natural sciences in Nuremberg with a specialization in zoology and botany. In 1882, he was awarded a scholarship that allowed him to study for a short period at the Institute of Zoology at the University of Naples.

He died unexpectedly from a sudden illness on June 6, 1923, in his office in Munich.

His eldest son, Erhard Hiltner (born 1893), continued his research, notably publishing in 1929 a second edition of his book Pflanzenschutz nach Monaten geordnet (Plant Protection Organized by Months).

== Scientific work ==
In 1885, he became the assistant of, an expert in seed quality control at the Tharandt Plant Physiology Research Station. Together, they conducted studies on the symbiotic relationships of the legume family Fabaceae with certain soil bacteria living on the root nodules, following the work of Hermann Hellriegel and Hermann Wilfarth. These studies led to the development of the first cultures of rhizobium bacteria. While in Tharandt, he also conducted studies on the importance of root nodules in the nitrogen nutrition of black alder.

At the same time, Hiltner prepared a thesis on "the diseases of plants of horticultural and agronomic interest caused by the fungus Botrytis cinerea and their treatment," which he presented in 1892 at the University of Erlangen, earning him a doctorate.

In 1902, he became the director of the Royal Institute of Agriculture and Botany in Munich (Königliche Agrikulturbotanische Anstalt, which would become in 1917 the Bavarian Institute for Plant Growth and Protection).

He was appointed professor at the Technical University of Munich in 1903, where he later earned the title of Professor Emeritus in Agricultural Bacteriology.

He first introduced the term "rhizosphere" during a lecture at the German Agricultural Society in April 1904, defining it as the region of soil directly influenced by root secretions and associated soil microorganisms.

== Publications ==
- Experiments on the Nitrogen Assimilation of Legumes (Versuche über die Stickstoff–assimilation von Leguminosen), with F. Nobbe and E. Hotter, 1891
- Some Diseases of Horticultural and Agricultural Cultivated Plants Caused by Botrytis cinerea and Their Control (Einige durch Botrytis cinerea erzeugte Krankheiten gärtnerischer und landwirthschaftlicher Culturpflanzen und deren Bekämpfung), doctoral thesis, 1892
- Inoculate the Soil! (Impfet den Boden!), with F. Nobbe, 1893
- On the Significance of the Root Nodules of Alnus glutinosa for the Nitrogen Nutrition of This Plant (Über die Bedeutung der Wurzelknöllchen von Alnus glutinosa für die Stickstoffernährung dieser Pflanze), 1894
- On Recent Experiences and Problems in the Field of Soil Bacteriology with Special Consideration of Green Manuring and Fallow (Über neuere Erfahrungen und Probleme aufdem Gebiete der Bodenbakteriologie unter besonderer Berücksichtigung der Gründüngung und Brache), 1904
- Plant Protection Organized by Month, "Pflanzenschutz, nach Monaten geordnet", 1909, 433 pages and 138 illustrations
- On the Poor Emergence and Winterkill of Cereals Due to Seed Infestation by Fusarium (Über das schlechte Auflaufen und die Auswinterung des Getreides infolge Befalls des Saatgutes durch Fusarium), 1911
- Increased Fodder Production from Local Plant Life (Vermehrte Futtergewinnung aus der heimischen Pflanzenwelt), 1915
