= FEMS Yeast Research =

Peer-reviewed scientific journal

- Discipline: Microbiology, Yeasts
- Language: English
- Edited by: John Morrissey

Publication details
- History: 2001–present
- Publisher: Oxford University Press
- Frequency: 8/year
- Impact factor: 3.2 (2022)

Standard abbreviations
- ISO 4: FEMS Yeast Res.

Indexing
- ISSN: 1567-1356 (print); 1567-1364 (web)
- LCCN: 200125651
- OCLC no.: 47108630

Links
- Journal homepage

FEMS Yeast Research is a peer-reviewed scientific journal focusing on yeast and yeast-like organisms. The journal was established in 2001. It is published by Oxford University Press on behalf of the Federation of European Microbiological Societies and the editor-in-chief is John Morrissey.

== Abstracting and indexing ==
The journal is indexed and abstracted in the following bibliographic databases:

- Academic Search Premier
- BIOSIS Previews
- Chemical Abstracts Service
- EMBASE
- Food Science & Technology Abstracts
- MEDLINE
- Science Citation Index Expanded
- Scopus

According to the Journal Citation Reports, the journal has a 2022 impact factor of 3.2.
