= FEMS Microbiology Ecology =

- Discipline: Microbial ecology
- Language: English
- Edited by: Max Häggblom

Publication details
- History: 1985-present
- Publisher: Oxford University Press
- Frequency: Monthly
- Impact factor: 4.1 (2025)

Standard abbreviations
- ISO 4: FEMS Microbiol. Ecol.

Indexing
- CODEN: FMECEZ
- ISSN: 0168-6496 (print); 1574-6941 (web)
- LCCN: 93015705
- OCLC no.: 38872946

Links
- Journal homepage

FEMS Microbiology Ecology is one of the seven FEMS, peer-reviewed scientific journals, which covers all aspects of microbial ecology.

According to the Journal Citation Reports, the journal has a 2025 impact factor of 4.1.

The editor-in-chief is Max Häggblom.
