= Microbial ecology =

Study of the relationship of microorganisms with their environment

The great plate count anomaly. Counts of cells obtained via cultivation are orders of magnitude lower than those directly observed under the microscope. This is because microbiologists are able to cultivate only a minority of naturally occurring microbes using current laboratory techniques, depending on the environment.

Microbial ecology (or environmental microbiology) is a discipline where the interaction of microorganisms and their environment are studied. Microorganisms are known to have beneficial, neutral and harmful ecological relationships within their species and other species. Many scientists have studied the relationship between nature and microorganisms: Martinus Beijerinck, Sergei Winogradsky, Louis Pasteur, Robert Koch, Lorenz Hiltner, Dionicia Gamboa and many more, to understand the specific roles that these microorganisms have in biological and chemical pathways and the evolution of these microorganisms. Currently, there are several types of biotechnologies that have allowed scientists to analyze the biological and chemical properties of these microorganisms.

Many of these microorganisms have been known to form different symbiotic relationships with other organisms in their environment. Some symbiotic relationships include mutualism, commensalism, amensalism, and parasitism.

In addition, certain antimicrobial substances in the environment can kill microorganisms, thus preventing them from interacting with their environment. These can be antibiotic, antifungal, or antiviral.

== Influential scientists ==
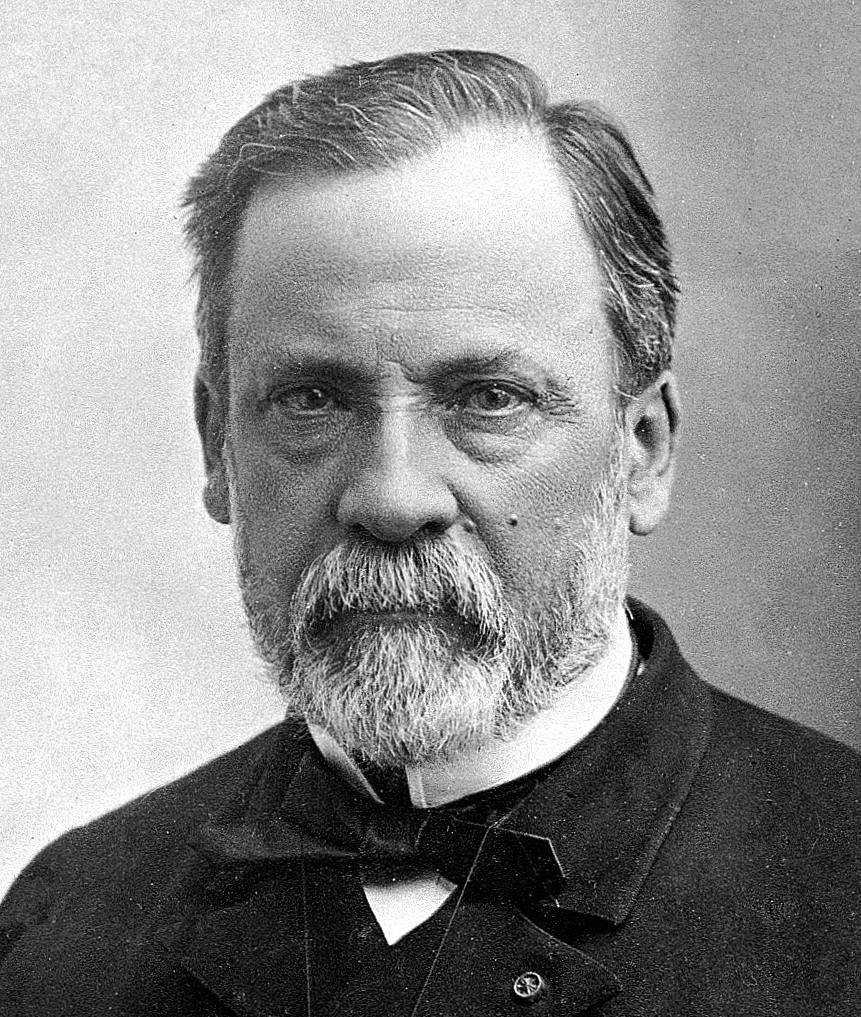
Louis Pasteur

Martinus Beijerinck invented the enrichment culture, a fundamental method culturing organisms for studying microbes from the environment. Sergei Winogradsky was one of the first researchers to attempt to understand microorganisms outside of the medical context—making him among the first students of microbial ecology and environmental microbiology—discovering chemosynthesis and developing the Winogradsky column in the process.

Louis Pasteur was a French chemist who derived key microbial principles that we use today: microbial fermentation, pasteurization, germ theory, and vaccines. These principles have served as a foundation for scientists in viewing the relationship between microbes and their environment. For example, Pasteur disproved the theory of spontaneous generation, the belief of life arising from nonliving materials. Pasteur stated that life can only come from life and not nonliving materials. This led to the idea that microorganisms were responsible for the microbial growth in any environment.

Robert Koch was a physician-scientist who implemented the use of an oil-immersion lens and a condenser while using microscopes, to increase the imagery of viewing bacteria. This led Koch to be the first publisher of bacteria photographs. As a result, Koch was able to study wound infections in animals at the microscopic level. He distinguished between distinct bacteria species, which led him to believe that the best way to study a certain disease is to focus on a specific pathogen. In 1879, Koch started to develop "pure" cultures to grow bacteria colonies. These advancements led Koch to solve the Cholera pandemic in India during the year 1883. Koch's laboratory techniques and materials led him to conclude that the use of unfiltered water that contained the bacteria thought to cause intestinal harm was causing the cholera pandemic.

Lorenz Hiltner is known as one of the pioneers in "microbial ecology." His research focused on how microbials in the rhizosphere provided nutrients to plants. Hiltner stated that the quality of plant products was a result of the plant's roots microflora. One of Hiltner contributions to the study of plant nutrition and soil bacteriology was creating antimicrobial seeds covered with mercury chloride. The sole purpose of creating the antimicrobial seeds were to protect the seeds from the harmful effects of pathogenic fungi. In addition, he recognized the known bacteria that were responsible for the nitrogen cycle: denitrification, nitrification, and nitrogen fixation.

== Important microbial roles in the environment ==
Microorganisms are the backbone of all ecosystems, even in areas where photosynthesis cannot take place. For example, chemosynthetic microorganisms are the primary producers in extreme environments, such as high temperature geothermal environments. In these extreme conditions, the chemosynthetic microbes provide energy and carbon to other organisms. Chemosynthetic microorganisms gain energy by oxidizing inorganic compounds such as hydrogen, nitrite, ammonia, sulfur and iron (II). These organisms can be found in both aerobic and anaerobic environment.

The nitrogen cycle, phosphorus cycle, sulphur cycle, and carbon cycle depend on microorganisms also. Each cycle involves microorganisms in certain processes. For example, nitrogen gas makes up 78% of the Earth's atmosphere, but it is almost chemically inert; as a result, it is unavailable to most organisms. It has to be converted biologically to an available form by microorganism, through nitrogen fixation. Through these biogeochemical cycles, microorganisms are able to make nutrients such as nitrogen, phosphorus and potassium available in the soil. Microorganisms play a role in solubilizing phosphate, improving soil health, and plant growth.

== Microbial applications in biotechnology ==
Microbial interactions are found in bioremediation. Bioremediation is a technology that removes contaminants from soil and wastewater using microorganisms. Examples of some microorganisms that play a role in bioremediation are the following: Pseudomonas, Bacillus, Arthrobacter, Corynebacterium, Methosinus, Rhodococcus, Stereum hirsutum, methanogens, Aspergilus niger, Pleurotus ostreatus, Rhizopus arrhizus, Azotobacter, Alcaligenes, Phormidium valderium, and Ganoderma applantus.

== Microbial evolution ==
Due to high levels of horizontal gene transfer among microbial communities, microbial ecology is also important to the study of evolution.

== Microbial symbiotic relationships ==
=== Mutualism ===
Mutualism is a close relationship between two different species in which each has a positive effect on the other. In mutualism, one partner provides service to the other partner and receives service from the other partner as well. Mutualism in microbial ecology is a relationship between microbial species and other species (example humans) that allows for both sides to benefit. Microorganisms form mutualistic relationships with other microorganism, plants or animals. One example of microbe-microbe interaction would be syntrophy, also known as cross-feeding, of which Methanobacterium omelianskii is a classic example. This consortium is formed by an ethanol fermenting organism and a methanogen. The ethanol-fermenting organism provides the archaeal partner with the H_{2}, which this methanogen needs in order to grow and produce methane. Syntrophy has been hypothesized to play a significant role in energy and nutrient-limited environments, such as deep subsurface, where it can help the microbial community with diverse functional properties to survive, grow and produce maximum amount of energy. Anaerobic oxidation of methane (AOM) is carried out by mutualistic consortium of a sulfate-reducing bacterium and an anaerobic methane-oxidizing archaeon. The reaction used by the bacterial partner for the production of H_{2} is endergonic (and so thermodynamically unfavored) however, when coupled to the reaction used by archaeal partner, the overall reaction becomes exergonic. Thus the two organisms are in a mutualistic relationship which allows them to grow and thrive in an environment, deadly for either species alone. Lichen is an example of a symbiotic organism.

Microorganisms also engage in mutualistic relationship with plants and a typical example of such relationship is arbuscular mycorrhizal (AM) relationship, a symbiotic relationship between plants and fungi. This relationship begins when chemical signals are exchanged between the plant and the fungi leading to the metabolic stimulation of the fungus. The fungus then attacks the epidermis of the plant's root and penetrates its highly branched hyphae into the cortical cells of the plant. In this relationship, the fungi gives the plant phosphate and nitrogen obtained from the soil, while the plant provides the fungi with carbohydrate and lipids obtained from photosynthesis. Also, microorganisms are involved in mutualistic relationship with mammals such as humans. As the host provides shelter and nutrient to the microorganisms, the microorganisms also provide benefits such as helping in the growth of the gastrointestinal tract of the host and protecting host from other detrimental microorganisms.

=== Commensalism ===
Commensalism is very common in microbial world, literally meaning "eating from the same table". It is a relationship between two species where one species benefits with no harm or benefit for the other species. Metabolic products of one microbial population are used by another microbial population without either gain or harm for the first population. There are many "pairs "of microbial species that perform either oxidation or reduction reaction to the same chemical equation. For example, methanogens produce methane by reducing CO_{2} to CH_{4}, while methanotrophs oxidise methane back to CO_{2}.

=== Amensalism ===
Amensalism (also commonly known as antagonism) is a type of symbiotic relationship where one species/organism is harmed while the other remains unaffected. One example of such a relationship that takes place in microbial ecology is between the microbial species Lactobacillus casei and Pseudomonas taetrolens. When co-existing in an environment, Pseudomonas taetrolens shows inhibited growth and decreased production of lactobionic acid (its main product) most likely due to the byproducts created by Lactobacillus casei during its production of lactic acid.

=== Parasitism ===
Certain microorganisms are known to have a host-parasite interaction with other organisms. For example, phytopathogenic fungi are known to infect and damage plants. The phytopathogenic fungi is a major issue in agriculture, because it has the capacity to infect its host by their root system. This is a major issue because the symptoms of the infection are not easily detected. Another example of a parasitic microorganism is the nematode. These organisms are known to cause river blindness and lymphatic filariasis in humans. These organisms are transmitted to hosts through different mosquito species from the following groups: Aedes, Anopheles, and Culex.

== Antimicrobials ==
Antimicrobials are substances that are capable of killing microorganism. Antimicrobials can have antibacterial or antibiotic, antifungal or antiviral activity and most of these substances are natural products or may have been obtained from natural products. Natural products are therefore vital in the discovery of pharmaceutical agents. Most of the naturally obtained antibiotics are produced by organism under the phylum Actinobacteria. The genus Streptomyces are responsible for most of the antibiotic substances produced by Actinobacteria. These natural products with antimicrobial properties belong to the terpenoids, spirotetronate, tetracenedione, lactam, and other groups of compounds. Examples include napyradiomycin, nomimicin, formicamycin, and isoikarugamycin. Some metals, particularly copper, silver, and gold also have antimicrobial properties. Using antimicrobial copper-alloy touch surfaces is a technique that has begun to be used in the 21st century to prevent the transmission of bacteria. Silver nanoparticles have also begun to be incorporated into building surfaces and fabrics, although concerns have been raised about the potential side-effects of the tiny particles on human health. Due to the antimicrobial properties certain metals possess, products such as medical devices are made using those metals.

== See also ==
- Microbial biogeography
- Microbial loop
- Outline of ecology
- International Society for Microbial Ecology
- The ISME Journal
