= Thomas Rosswall =

Swedish environmental scientist

Thomas Rosswall was Associate Professor in Soil ecology at the Swedish University of Agricultural Sciences (1979-1984), Professor, Water in Environment and Society (1984-1987) at the University of Linköping, Sweden, Executive Director of the International Geosphere-Biosphere Programme (IGBP at the Royal Swedish Academy of Sciences, 1987-1994), Director of the International START Secretariat (Washington, DC, 1992-1993), Rector of the Swedish University of Agricultural Sciences (1994-2000) and Executive Director of the International Council for Science (ICSU in Paris, France, 2002-2009); Rosswall took up the position after giving up his seat as the director of the International Foundation for Science in late 2001 (IFS). Rosswall is currently Chair of the Scientific Advisory Board of the Swedish International Development Cooperation Agency (Sida, 2016- ).
