= FEMS Microbiology Reviews =

- Discipline: Microbiology
- Language: English
- Edited by: Karin Sauer, David Blackbourn, Bart Thomma

Publication details
- History: 1985–present
- Publisher: Oxford University Press
- Frequency: 6/year
- Impact factor: 10.1 (2023)

Standard abbreviations
- ISO 4: FEMS Microbiol. Rev.

Indexing
- ISSN: 0168-6445 (print); 1574-6976 (web)
- LCCN: 94648564
- OCLC no.: 12105491

Links
- Journal homepage

FEMS Microbiology Reviews is a peer-reviewed scientific journal publishing invited review articles in the field of microbiology. The journal was established in 1985, and is published by Oxford University Press on behalf of the Federation of European Microbiological Societies. The editors-in-chief are Karin Sauer, David Blackbourn, and Bart Thomma.

== Abstracting and indexing ==
The journal is indexed and abstracted in the following bibliographic databases:

- Academic Search Premier
- Aquatic Sciences and Fisheries Abstracts
- BIOSIS Previews
- CAB Abstracts
- Chemical Abstracts Service
- Embase
- Food Science & Technology Abstracts
- MEDLINE
- Science Citation Index Expanded
- Scopus

According to the Journal Citation Reports, the journal has a 2023 impact factor of 10.1.
