= The ISME Journal =

- Discipline: Microbial ecology
- Language: English

Publication details
- History: 2007–present
- Publisher: Oxford Academic
- Frequency: Continuous
- Open access: Yes
- License: CC BY
- Impact factor: 10.0 (2024)

Standard abbreviations
- ISO 4: ISME J.

Indexing
- ISSN: 1751-7362 (print); 1751-7370 (web)
- LCCN: 2007243685
- OCLC no.: 182943088

Links
- Journal homepage; Online archive

The ISME Journal: Multidisciplinary Journal of Microbial Ecology is a peer-reviewed scientific journal that covers diverse and integrated areas of microbial ecology spanning the breadth of microbial life, including bacteria, archaea, microbial eukaryotes, and viruses. It is an official publication of the International Society for Microbial Ecology (ISME) and publishes original research articles, reviews, and commentaries. The founding editors-in-chief are Mark Bailey and George Kowalchuk. The current editors-in-chief are Josh Neufeld, Lisa Stein, Jillian Petersen, and Thulani Makhalanyane ]. The journal is published on behalf of ISME by Oxford University Press. According to the Journal Citation Reports, the journal has a 2024 impact factor of 10.0.
