= German Society for Hygiene and Microbiology =

- Deutsche Gesellschaft für Hygiene und Mikrobiologie
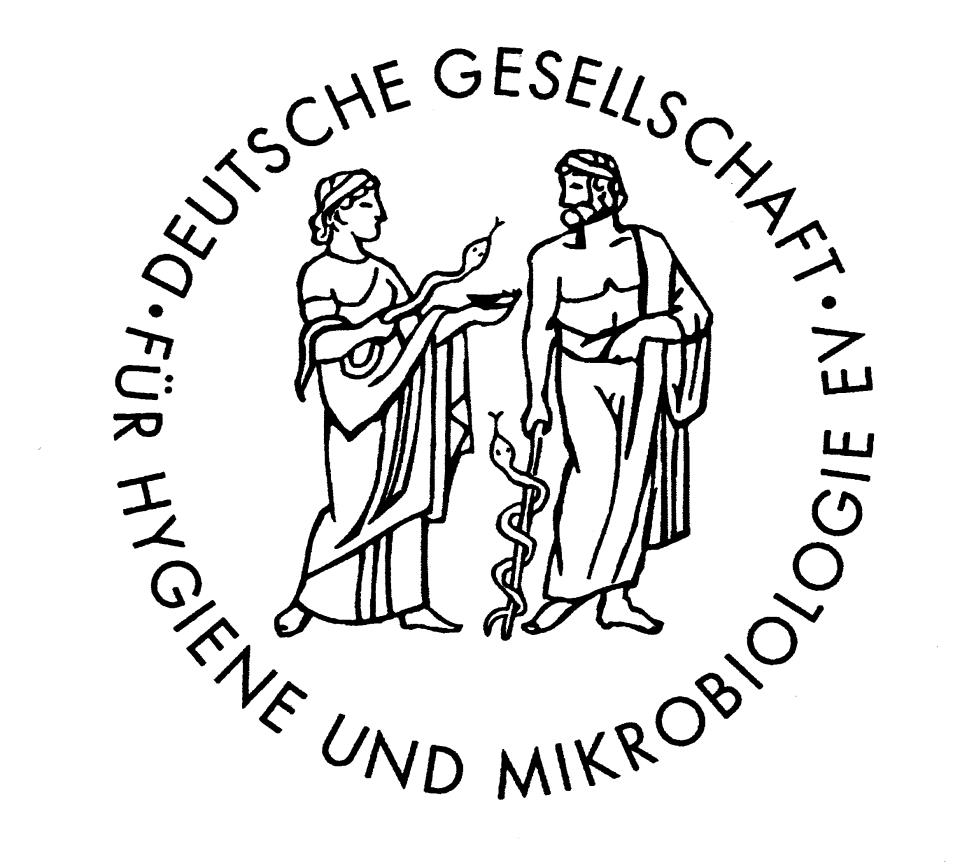
- Isignia of the German society for hygiene and microbiology
- Abbreviation: DGHM
- Predecessor: Society for Microbiology
- Formation: 1906; 120 years ago
- Type: Medical society
- Purpose: To advance research in the fields of infectious diseases and microbiology
- Region served: Germany
- Website: German Society for Hygiene and Microbiology

The German Society for Hygiene and Microbiology (German: Deutsche Gesellschaft für Hygiene und Mikrobiologie, DGHM), formerly known as the Society for Microbiology, is a German medical society, which works to advance research in the fields of infectious diseases and microbiology. It was founded in 1906.
