= Federation of European Microbiological Societies =

- Formation: 1974
- Type: Nonprofit organization
- Members: 30,000
- Website: fems-microbiology.org

Federation of European Microbiological Societies (FEMS) is an international European scientific organization, formed by the union of a number of national organizations; there are now 57 members from 41 European countries, regular and provisional. Members can apply for fellowships, grants and/or support when organising a meeting. FEMS facilitates exchange of scientific knowledge to all microbiologists in Europe and worldwide by publishing seven microbiology journals and organising a biennial congress for microbiologists around the world. It also initiates campaigns such as the European Academy of Microbiology (EAM).

Since 1977, it has been the sponsor of FEMS Microbiology Letters, a single journal. Now, FEMS publishes seven journals:

- FEMS Microbiology Ecology
- FEMS Microbiology Reviews
- FEMS Microbiology Letters
- FEMS Yeast Research
- Pathogens and Disease a journal preceded by FEMS Immunology and Medical Microbiology
- FEMS Microbes
- FEMS microLife

Originally published for the Society by Elsevier, then by Wiley-Blackwell, they are now published by Oxford University Press.
