= Viable but nonculturable =

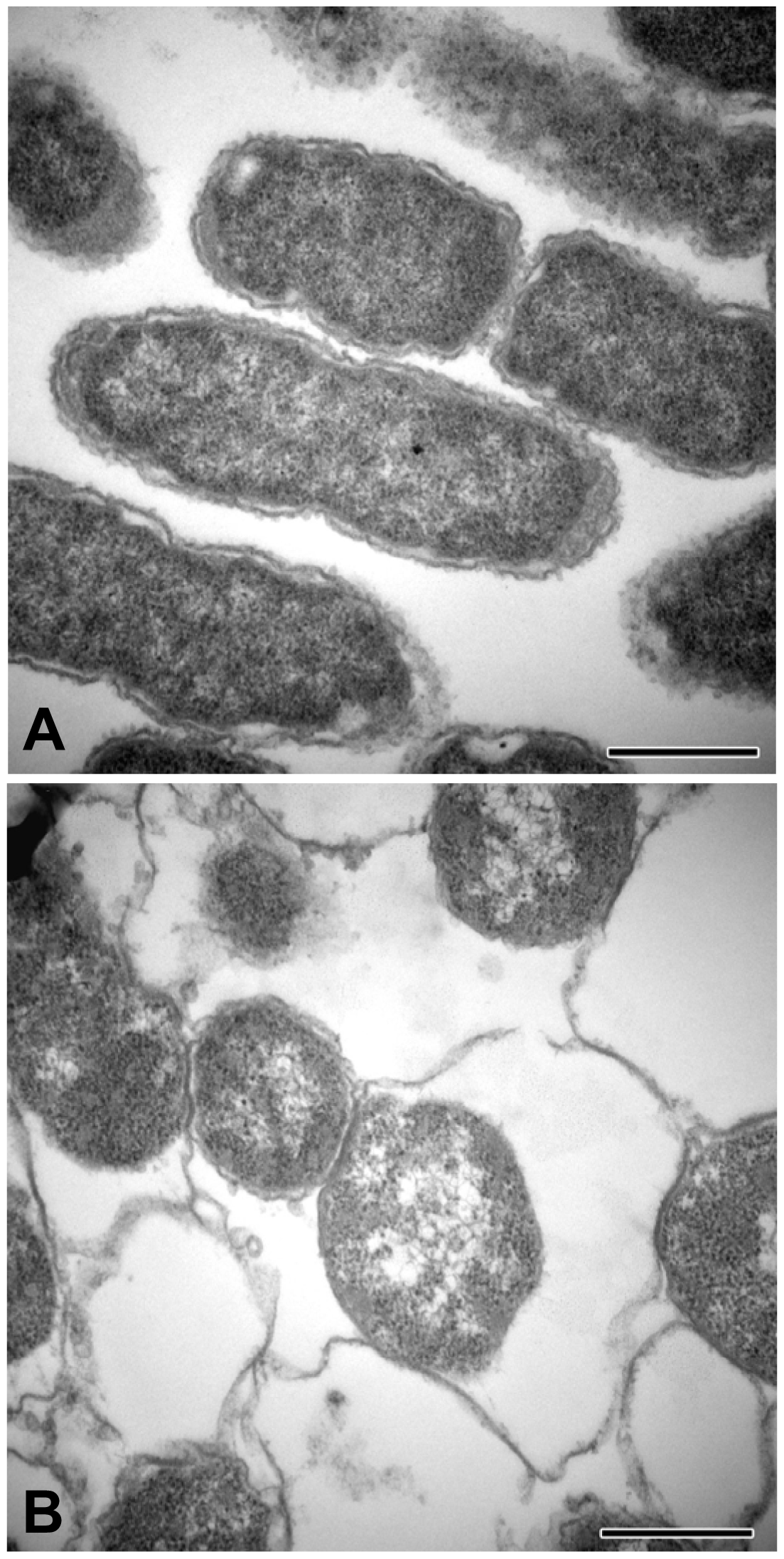
Transmission electron micrographs of actively growing (panel A) and nonculturable (panel B) Yersinia pestis. Bar equals 0.5 microns.

Viable but nonculturable (VBNC) bacteria refers as to bacteria that are in a state of very low metabolic activity and do not divide, but are alive and have the ability to become culturable once resuscitated.

Bacteria in a VBNC state cannot grow on standard growth media, though flow cytometry can measure the viability of the bacteria. Bacteria can enter the VBNC state as a response to stress, due to adverse nutrient, temperature, osmotic, oxygen, and light conditions. The cells that are in the VBNC state are morphologically smaller, and demonstrate reduced nutrient transport, rate of respiration, and synthesis of macromolecules. Sometimes, VBNC bacteria can remain in that state for over a year. It has been shown that numerous pathogens and non-pathogens can enter the VBNC state, which therefore has significant implications in pathogenesis, bioremediation, and other branches of microbiology.

The existence of the VBNC state is controversial. The validity and interpretation of the assays to determine the VBNC state have been questioned.

== VBNC pathogens ==
Species known to enter a VBNC state:

- Aeromonas hydrophila
- Aeromonas salmonicida
- Agrobacterium tumefaciens
- Burkholderia cepacia
- Burkholderia pseudomallei
- Brettanomyces bruxellensis
- Campylobacter coli
- Campylobacter jejuni
- Campylobacter lari
- Cytophaga allerginae
- Enterobacter aerogenes
- Enterobacter cloacae
- Enterococcus faecalis
- Enterococcus hirae
- Enterococcus faecium
- Erwinia amylovora
- Escherichia coli (including EHEC)
- Francisella tularensis
- Helicobacter pylori
- Klebsiella aerogenes
- Klebsiella pneumoniae
- Klebsiella planticola
- Legionella pneumophila
- Listeria monocytogenes
- Micrococcus luteus
- Mycobacterium tuberculosis
- Mycobacterium smegmatis
- Pasteurella piscicida
- Pseudomonas aeruginosa
- Pseudomonas syringae
- Pseudomonas putida KT2440
- Ralstonia solanacearum
- Rhizobium leguminosarum
- Rhizobium meliloti
- Salmonella enterica
- Salmonella Typhi
- Salmonella Typhimurium
- Serratia marcescens
- Shigella dysenteriae
- Shigella flexneri
- Shigella sonnei
- Streptococcus faecalis
- Tersicoccus phoenicis
- Vibrio alginolyticus
- Vibrio anguillarum
- Vibrio campbellii
- Vibrio cholerae
- Vibrio harveyi
- Vibrio mimicus
- Vibrio parahaemolyticus
- Vibrio shiloi
- Vibrio vulnificus (types 1 and 2)
- Xanthomonas campestris
- Xanthomonas axonopodis pv. citri
- Yersinia pestis
