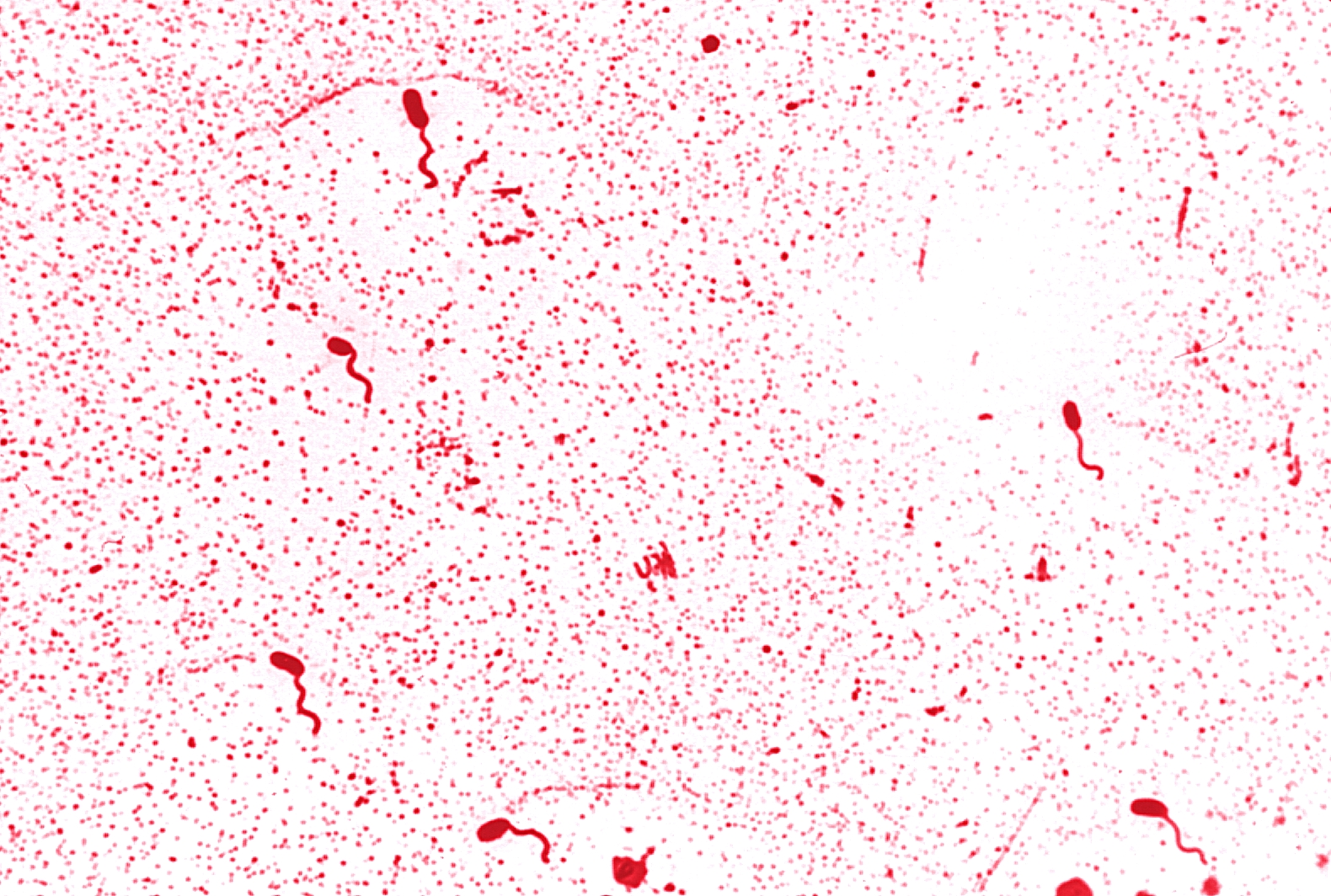
- Flagellar stain of V. cholerae

Scientific classification
- Domain: Bacteria
- Kingdom: Pseudomonadati
- Phylum: Pseudomonadota
- Class: Gammaproteobacteria
- Order: Vibrionales
- Family: Vibrionaceae
- Genus: Vibrio; Pacini 1854

Type species
- Vibrio cholerae

Species
- V. adaptatus V. aerogenes V. aestivus V. aestuarianus V. agarivorans V. albensis V. alfacsensis V. alginolyticus V. anguillarum V. areninigrae V. artabrorum V. atlanticus V. atypicus V. azureus V. brasiliensis V. bubulus V. calviensis V. campbellii V. casei V. chagasii V. cholerae V. cincinnatiensis V. coralliilyticus V. crassostreae V. cyclitrophicus V. diabolicus V. diazotrophicus V. ezurae V. fluvialis V. fortis V. furnissii V. gallicus V. gazogenes V. gigantis V. halioticoli V. harveyi V. hepatarius V. hippocampi V. hispanicus V. ichthyoenteri V. indicus V. kanaloae V. lentus V. litoralis V. logei V. mediterranei V. metschnikovii V. mimicus V. mytili V. natriegens V. navarrensis V. neonatus V. neptunius V. nereis V. nigripulchritudo V. ordalii V. orientalis V. pacinii V. parahaemolyticus V. pectenicida V. pelagius V. penaeicida V. pomeroyi V. ponticus V. proteolyticus V. rotiferianus V. ruber V. rumoiensis V. salmonicida V. scophthalmi V. splendidus V. superstes V. tapetis V. tasmaniensis V. tubiashii V. vulnificus V. wodanis V. xuii

Synonyms
- Allomonas Kalina et al. 1984; Beneckea Campbell 1957 (Approved Lists 1980); Lucibacterium Hendrie et al. 1970 (Approved Lists 1980)

= Vibrio =

Genus of bacteria and the disease it can cause

Vibrio is a genus of Gram-negative bacteria, which have a characteristic curved-rod (comma) shape, several species of which can cause foodborne infection or soft-tissue infection called Vibriosis. Infection is commonly associated with eating undercooked seafood. Highly salt and alkali tolerant, Vibrio spp. are commonly found in various salt water environments, but some species are found in freshwater. Vibrio spp. are facultative anaerobes that test positive for oxidase and do not form spores. All members of the genus are motile. They are able to have polar or lateral flagellum with or without sheaths. Vibrio species typically possess two chromosomes, which is unusual for bacteria. Each chromosome has a distinct and independent origin of replication, and are conserved together over time in the genus. Recent phylogenies have been constructed based on a suite of genes (multilocus sequence analysis).

O. F. Müller (1773, 1786) described eight species of the genus Vibrio (included in Infusoria), three of which were spirilliforms. Some of the other species are today assigned to eukaryote taxa, e.g., to the euglenoid Peranema or to the diatom Bacillaria. However, Vibrio Müller, 1773 became regarded as the name of a zoological genus, and the name of the bacterial genus became Vibrio Pacini, 1854. Filippo Pacini isolated micro-organisms he called "vibrions" from cholera patients in 1854, because of their motility. In Latin "vibrio" means "to quiver".

== Biochemical characteristics of Vibrio spp. ==
The genus Vibrio contains a large number of species, and these vary somewhat in their biochemical characteristics. Colony, morphological, physiological, and biochemical characteristics of the genus Vibrio are shown in the Table below.

Test type	Test	Group-1	Group-2
Colony characters	Size	Medium	Medium
Colony characters	Type	Round	Round
Colony characters	Color	Whitish	Whitish
Colony characters	Shape	Convex	Convex
Morphological characters	Shape	Curved-rod	Curved-rod
Physiological characters	Motility	+	+
Physiological characters	Growth at 6.5% NaCl	+	+
Biochemical characters	Gram's staining	–	–
Biochemical characters	Oxidase	+	+
Biochemical characters	Catalase	+	+
Biochemical characters	Oxidative-Fermentative	Fermentative	Oxidative
Biochemical characters	Motility	+	+
Biochemical characters	Methyl Red	+	–
Biochemical characters	Voges-Proskauer	+	–
Biochemical characters	Indole	–	–
Biochemical characters	H_{2}S Production	–	+
Biochemical characters	Urease	–	+
Biochemical characters	Nitrate reductase	–	+
Biochemical characters	β-Galactosidase	+	+
Hydrolysis of	Gelatin	+	+
Hydrolysis of	Aesculin	–	+
Hydrolysis of	Casein	–	+
Hydrolysis of	Tween 40	+	+
Hydrolysis of	Tween 60	+	+
Hydrolysis of	Tween 80	+	+
Acid production from	Glycerol	+	+
Acid production from	Galactose	–	+
Acid production from	D-Glucose	+	+
Acid production from	D-Fructose	+	V
Acid production from	D-Mannose	+	V
Acid production from	Mannitol	+	V
Acid production from	N-Acetylglucosamine	+	+
Acid production from	Amygdalin	+	–
Acid production from	Maltose	+	+
Acid production from	D-Melibiose	–	–
Acid production from	D-Trehalose	+	–
Acid production from	Glycogen	+	+
Acid production from	D-Turanose	+	+

Note: Group-1: Vibrio alginolyticus; Group-2: Vibrio natriegens, Vibrio pelagius, Vibrio azureus; + = Positive; – =Negative; V =Variable (+/–)

== Pathogenic strains ==
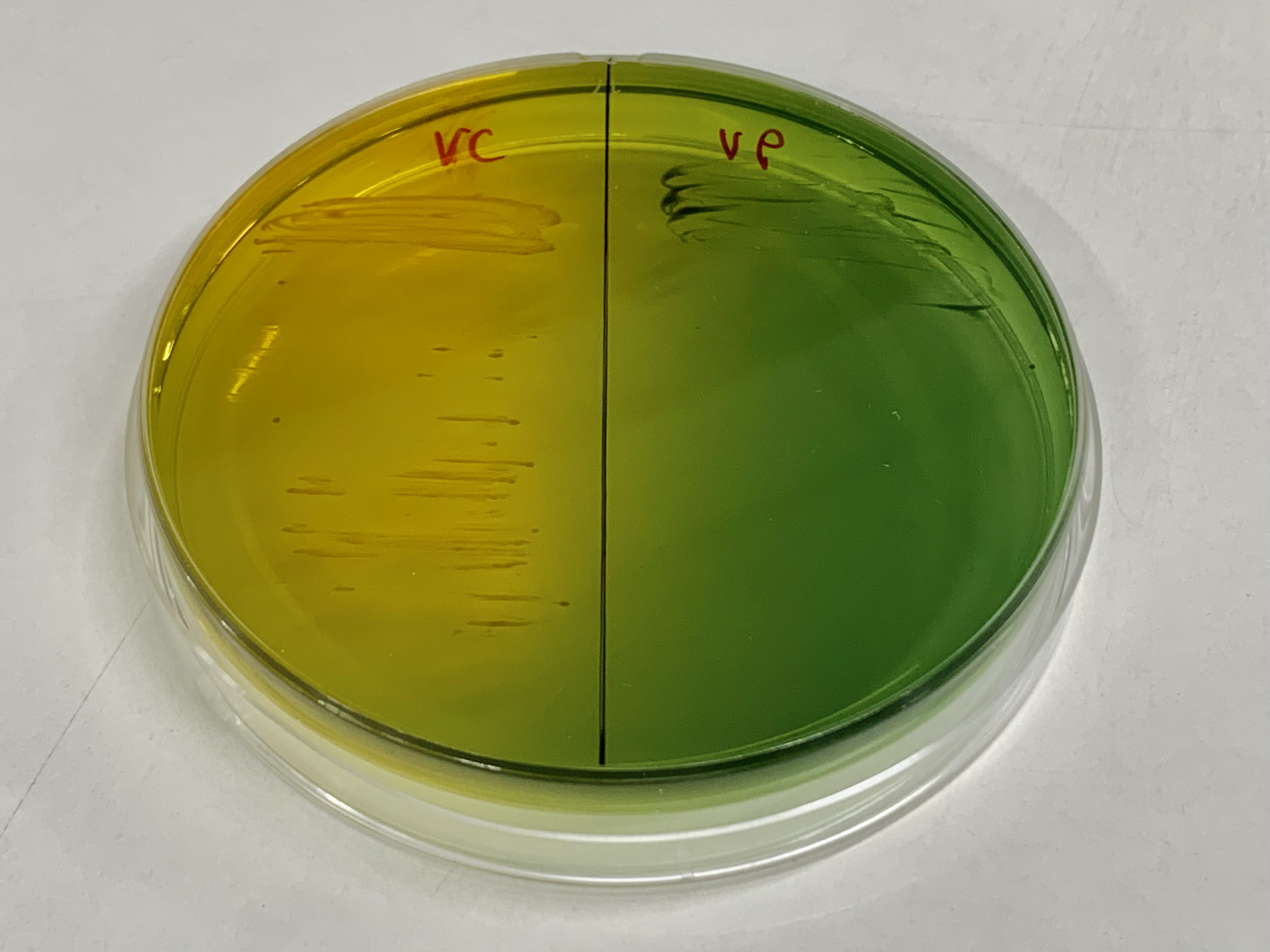
TCBS agar plate of Vibrio Cholerae (left) and Vibrio parahaemolyticus (right)

Several species of Vibrio are pathogens. Most disease-causing strains are associated with gastroenteritis, but can also infect open wounds and cause sepsis. They can be carried by numerous marine animals, such as crabs or prawns, and have been known to cause fatal infections in humans after exposure. Risk of clinical disease and death increases with certain factors, such as uncontrolled diabetes, elevated iron levels (cirrhosis, sickle cell disease, hemochromatosis), and cancer or other immunocompromised states. Pathogenic Vibrio species include V. cholerae (the causative agent of cholera), V. parahaemolyticus, and V. vulnificus. V. cholerae is generally transmitted by contaminated water. Pathogenic Vibrio species can cause foodborne illness (infection), usually associated with eating undercooked seafood. When ingested Vibrio bacteria can primarily result in watery diarrhea along with other secondary symptoms. The pathogenic features can be linked to quorum sensing, where bacteria are able to express their virulence factor via their signaling molecules. Warmer waters and increased flooding due to climate change promote the growth and spread of Vibrio bacteria.

V. vulnificus outbreaks commonly occur in warm climates and small, generally lethal, outbreaks occur regularly. An outbreak occurred in New Orleans after Hurricane Katrina, and several lethal cases occur most years in Florida. As of 2013 in the United States, Vibrio infections as a whole were up 43% when compared with the rates observed in 2006–2008. V. vulnificus, the most severe strain, has not increased. Foodborne Vibrio infections are most often associated with eating raw shellfish.

V. parahaemolyticus is also associated with the Kanagawa phenomenon, in which strains isolated from human hosts (clinical isolates) are hemolytic on blood agar plates, while those isolated from nonhuman sources are not hemolytic.

Many Vibrio species are also zoonotic. They cause disease in fish and shellfish, and are common causes of mortality among domestic marine life.

Some Vibrio species are also associated with corals and can be pathogenic towards them. These species when present in too high of concentrations can contribute to coral bleaching. When sea temperatures rise, more Vibrio become present in the environments releasing the zooxanthellae from healthy corals. This gives the characteristic white color of bleached corals.

== Diagnosis ==
=== Cholera ===
A common sign of Vibrio infection is cholera. Cholera primarily presents with rapid water loss by watery diarrhea. Other symptoms include vomiting and muscle cramps. Water loss can lead to dehydration which can be mild to moderate to severe. Moderate to severe dehydration requires immediate treatment. V. cholerae is the most common pathogen that causes cholera. The gold standard for detecting cholera is through cultures of stool samples or rectal swabs. Identification is then done through microscopy or by agglutination of antibodies. Cultures are done in thiosulfate citrate bile-salts sucrose agar. V cholerae will form yellow colonies.

=== Vibriosis ===
Common causes of vibriosis include consumption of raw or undercooked shellfish, or skin wound exposure to sea water. Symptoms include diarrhea, nausea, headaches, fever and chills. Vibriosis has the potential to progress into necrotizing fasciitis and/or sepsis.

V. parahaemolyticus is the most common pathogen in vibriosis, however V. vulnificus is more common in people who have certain risk factors like older age, liver disease or diabetes. Like all vibrio diagnosis, vibriosis can also be determined in stool cultures. V. parahaemolyticus and V. vulnificus will form green colonies.

== Treatment ==
Medical care depends on the clinical presentation and the presence of underlying medical conditions.

=== Vibrio gastroenteritis ===
Because Vibrio gastroenteritis is self-limited in most patients, no specific medical therapy is required. Patients who cannot tolerate oral fluid replacement may require intravenous fluid therapy.

Although most Vibrio species are sensitive to antibiotics, such as doxycycline or ciprofloxacin, antibiotic therapy does not shorten the course of the illness or the duration of pathogen excretion. However, if the patient is ill and has a high fever or an underlying medical condition, oral antibiotic therapy with doxycycline or ciprofloxacin can be initiated.

=== Non-cholera Vibrio infections ===
Patients with non-cholera Vibrio wound infection or sepsis are much more ill and frequently have other medical conditions. Medical therapy consists of:

- Prompt initiation of effective antibiotic therapy (doxycycline or a quinolone)
- Intensive medical therapy with aggressive fluid replacement and vasopressors for hypotension and septic shock to correct acid-base and electrolytes abnormalities that may be associated with severe sepsis
- Early fasciotomy within 24 hours after development of clinical symptoms can be life-saving in patients with necrotizing fasciitis.
- Early debridement of the infected wound has an important role in successful therapy and is especially indicated to avoid amputation of fingers, toes, or limbs.
- Expeditious and serial surgical evaluation and intervention are required because patients may deteriorate rapidly, especially those with necrotizing fasciitis or compartment syndrome.
- Reconstructive surgery, such as skin grafts, are used in the recovery phase.

== Prevention ==
=== Cholera ===
The most effective method to prevent cholera is the improvement of water and food safety. This includes the sanitation of water, proper preparation of food and community awareness of outbreaks. Prevention has been most effective in countries where cholera is endemic.

Another method is cholera vaccines. Examples of cholera vaccines include Dukoral and Vaxchora.

=== Vibriosis ===
Prevention of vibriosis is mostly effective in food processing. Food items, mostly seafood, that commonly contain vibrio organisms are regularly controlled. The water that seafood is fished or farmed from is analyzed to determine microorganism content. Food processing methods like pasteurization and high pressure are used to eliminate microorganisms and pathogens.

== Other species ==
V. harveyi is a pathogen of several aquatic animals, and is notable as a cause of luminous vibriosis in shrimp (prawns). Aliivibrio fischeri (or V. fischeri) is known for its mutualistic symbiosis with the Hawaiian bobtail squid, which is dependent on microbial luminescence.

== Flagella ==
The "typical", early-discovered Vibrio species, such as V. cholerae, have a single polar flagellum (monotrichous) with sheath. Some species, such as V. parahaemolyticus and V. alginolyticus, have both a single polar flagellum with sheath and thin flagella projecting in all directions (peritrichous), and the other species, such as V. fischeri, have tufts of polar flagella with sheath (lophotrichous).

=== Structure ===
Typical bacterial flagellum structure contains three components: the basal body, the hook and the filament. Like typical bacteria, Vibrio spp, have these three components, but with increased complexity in the basal body. In addition, Vibrio spp. use five or six distinct flagellum subunits to construct the flagellar filament, rather than the single flagellin found in many other bacteria. In Vibrio spp, most have a single flagellum located on one pole of the bacterium, although some species have additional flagella in peritrichous or lophotrichous arrangements. Another difference is that the gradient used to power the flagellar motor is sodium driven rather than proton driven; this creates greater torque, and Vibrio flagella have been shown to rotate over five times faster than the H^{+}-driven flagella of E. coli. The flagellum is also surrounded by a sheath extending from the membrane. The purpose of this sheath has yet to be determined.

=== Effect on Virulence ===
Motility is very important for Vibrio spp for infection. Research has shown that a variety of Vibrios mutants that are defective in flagella synthesis or non-motile are defective in infection. Loss of motility in Vibrio has shown impaired colonization and adherence to host's intestines.

== Natural transformation ==
Natural transformation is a common bacterial adaptation for DNA transfer that employs numerous bacterial gene products. For a recipient bacterium to bind, take up, and recombine exogenous DNA into its chromosome, it must become competent, that is, enter a special physiologic state. The DNA-uptake process of naturally competent V. cholerae involves an extended competence-induced pilus and a DNA-binding protein that acts as a ratchet and reels DNA into the periplasm. Natural transformation has also been described for V. fischeri, V. vulnificus and V. parahaemolyticus.

== Small RNA ==
V. cholerae has been used in discoveries of many bacterial small RNAs. Using sRNA-Seq and Northern blot candidate sRNAs were identified and characterised as IGR-sRNA (intragenic region), AS-sRNAs (transcribed from the antisense strand of the open reading frame (ORF) and ORF-derived. One of the candidates from this study, IGR 7, was shown to be involved in carbon metabolism and later renamed MtlS RNA. Other sRNAs identified in V. cholerae through genetic screens and computational methods include Qrr RNA, Vibrio regulatory RNA of OmpA, MiX sRNA, Vibrio cholerae ToxT activated RNAs, foR RNA, and VqmR sRNA.

== See also ==
- Cholera toxin
- Climate change and infectious diseases
