= Vibrio scophthalmi =

Scientific classification
- Domain: Bacteria
- Kingdom: Pseudomonadati
- Phylum: Pseudomonadota
- Class: Gammaproteobacteria
- Order: Vibrionales
- Family: Vibrionaceae
- Genus: Vibrio
- Species: V. scophthalmi

Binomial name
- Vibrio scophthalmi Cerda-Cuellar et al., 1997

Species of bacterium

Vibrio scopthalmi is a species of gram-negative bacteria from the genus Vibrio. The species was first isolated from the intestinal tract of farmed turbot in Northern Spain. V. scopthalmi is an emerging aquaculture pathogen, especially among many popular aquaculture species in Asia.

Vibrio scopthalmi is part of the gastrointestinal flora of many species and the bacterium can act as an opportunistic pathogen. V. scopthalmi has been linked to disease outbreaks in several species, such as turbot, olive flounder (Paralichthys olivaceus), Japanese eel (Anguilla japonica), and black rockfish (Sebastes schlegeli).

== Phenotypic characteristics ==
Vibrio scopthalmi are halophilic, gram-negative rods. The species shares many characteristics with other members of the genus including glucose fermentation, oxidase and catalase production, and sensitivity to the antivibrio agent O/129.

V. scopthalmi produces two autoinducers (AIs) and possesses a quorum sensing (QS) system that are similar to other Vibrio.

=== Growth characteristics ===
Vibrio scopthalmi has an optimal growth temperature between 25-30 °C. This halophilic species requires NaCl for growth and prefers a concentration between 1-6%. The species grows readily on laboratory media including TCBS agar. Colonies are either yellow or green on TCBS agar.
