= Vibrio navarrensis =

Scientific classification
- Domain: Bacteria
- Kingdom: Pseudomonadati
- Phylum: Pseudomonadota
- Class: Gammaproteobacteria
- Order: Vibrionales
- Family: Vibrionaceae
- Genus: Vibrio
- Species: V. navarrensis

Binomial name
- Vibrio navarrensis (Urdachi et al. 1991)

Species of bacterium

Vibrio navarrensis is an aquatic, gram-negative bacterium first isolated from sewage in 1991. V. navarrensis is a rare cause of human disease. Wound infection with the bacterium can produce an erysipelas-like disease. It has also been isolated from the blood.

V. navarrensis grows readily on laboratory media such as TCBS agar, the media used to selectively isolate Vibrio. The bacterium shares many phenotypic characteristics with V. vulnificus, although it can be differentiated by negative test results for lysine, ornithine decarboxylase, and salicin fermentation.
