= Vibrio lentus =

Scientific classification
- Domain: Bacteria
- Kingdom: Pseudomonadati
- Phylum: Pseudomonadota
- Class: Gammaproteobacteria
- Order: Vibrionales
- Family: Vibrionaceae
- Genus: Vibrio
- Species: V. lentus

Binomial name
- Vibrio lentus Macián et al. 2001

Species of bacterium

Vibrio lentus is a species of Gram-negative bacteria found in marine environments. It was first isolated from Mediterranean oysters. It is pathogenic to octopuses and has been found to cause skin lesions, exposure of muscle, and sometimes death.

== Description ==
The phenotype of V. lentus is similar to that of Vibrio splendidus. It was first described as a new species by Macian, Ludwig, Aznar, Grimont, Schleifer, Garay and Pujalte, in 2001. Isolates of oysters and sea water were taken from the Mediterranean coast of Spain, and the analysis was done "by performing ribotyping and DNA–DNA hybridization, by analysing DNA+GC content and cultural and physiological features, and by phylogenetic studies of 16S and 23S rRNA".

The cells are 1.5–3 μm long by 0.8–1.0 μm wide; they are motile with a single flagellum at one pole. They are facultatively anaerobic and are able to break down glucose to acid under anaerobic conditions. They are Gram-negative, and catalase- and oxidase-positive, and reduce nitrates to nitrites.

== Pathology ==
Vibrio lentus has been isolated from lesions found on the mantle and arms of the common octopus (Octopus vulgaris), where it forms rounded, hard lumps, and in more severe cases, loss of skin and exposure of the muscles beneath. Experimental introduction of the bacteria to healthy octopuses resulted in the formation of lesions, colonisation of the internal organs, and eventually death.

The related species Vibrio harveyi is pathogenic to Gorgonian corals, oysters, prawns, lobsters, the common snook, barramundi, turbot, milkfish, and seahorses. In a research study in which over 200 bacterial isolates were tested in European sea bass (Dicentrarchus labrax) larvae as potential probiotics, V. lentus was the most efficacious, being harmless to the fish larvae and giving protection against vibriosis caused by V. harveyi.
