= Vibrio cincinnatiensis =

Scientific classification
- Domain: Bacteria
- Kingdom: Pseudomonadati
- Phylum: Pseudomonadota
- Class: Gammaproteobacteria
- Order: Vibrionales
- Family: Vibrionaceae
- Genus: Vibrio
- Species: V. cincinnatiensis

Binomial name
- Vibrio cincinnatiensis Brayton et al. 1986

Species of bacteria

Vibrio cincinnatiensis is a species of gram-negative bacteria. It was named after Cincinnati, Ohio, where it was first isolated and characterized. It is rarely isolated from human specimens. In 2019, V. cincinnatiensis accounted for only 0.07% of all confirmed cases of vibriosis in the United States.

== Description ==
Vibrio cincinnatiensis is a halophilic, facultatively anaerobic gram-negative rod, 0.7 by 2.0 μm in diameter. This organism is oxidase positive and catalase positive. Cells are motile by a single polar flagellum. V. cincinnatiensis produces yellow colonies on TCBS agar, indicating sucrose fermentation.

== Clinical significance ==
Vibrio cincinnatiensis is listed as a pathogenic member of Vibrionaceae. However, due to the low number of reported cases and the broad diversity of disease presentation, this bacterium's status as a human enteric or wound pathogen is unclear.

V. cincinnatiensis was first isolated from the blood and cerebrospinal fluid of a 70-year-old male at the University of Cincinnati Hospital in 1986. The patient had no known contact with seafood or seawater. Therapy was begun with ampicillin followed by moxalactam. The patient's uneventful recovery represented the first successful treatment of Vibrio sp. meningitis in an adult.

V. cincinnatiensis has also been isolated from the stool of a patient experiencing gastroenteritis.

== Ecology ==
Similar to other members of the Vibrionaceae family, V. cincinnatiensis is most commonly isolated from marine and aquatic environments. This bacterium was isolated from several bodies of water including the Chesapeake Bay, Adriatic Sea, and Ota River. In all these studies, V. cincinnatiensis represented only a small fraction of the total resident Vibrio populations.

V. cincinnatiensis has been isolated from the droppings of urban crows.
