= Vibrio coralliilyticus =

Scientific classification
- Domain: Bacteria
- Kingdom: Pseudomonadati
- Phylum: Pseudomonadota
- Class: Gammaproteobacteria
- Order: Vibrionales
- Family: Vibrionaceae
- Genus: Vibrio
- Species: V. coralliilyticus

Binomial name
- Vibrio coralliilyticus Pollock et al., 2010

Species of bacterium

Vibrio coralliilyticus is a Gram-negative, rod-shaped bacterium. It has a polar flagellum that is used for motility and has been shown to be critical for its virulence to corals. It is a versatile pathogen, impacting several marine invertebrates including Pocillopora damicornis corals (hence its name), both the Pacific and Eastern Oyster's larvae (Crassostrea gigas and Crassostrea virginica) and some vertebrates such as the rainbow trout. It is a bacterium of considerable interest given its direct contribution to temperature dependent coral bleaching as well as its impacts on aquaculture where it can contribute to significant mortalities in larval oyster hatcheries. There are several known virulent strains, which appear on both the Pacific and Atlantic Coasts of the United States. After its initial discovery some strains were incorrectly classified as Vibrio tubiashii including the RE22 and RE98 strains but were later reclassified as Vibrio coralliilyticus.

== Pathogenicity and virulence factors ==
Vibrio coralliilyticus is a causative agent of both bacterially induced coral bleaching and larval oyster mortality. In corals this bleaching is the result of the death of endosymbiont colonies which is mediated by V. coralliilyticus disabling Photosystem II and in some cases causing cell lysis. This also seems to be exacerbated by increased virulence as a result of increasing ocean temperatures. In oyster larvae an outbreak of V. coralliilyticus in a hatchery can result in mortality of up to 80%, greatly reducing hatchery production for that season leading to significant economic loss. In oysters the pathogen can cause deformities of the cilia as well as disfigurements of the velum, and eventually death. V. coralliilyticus also kills bacterial cells as well utilizing a Type VI secretion system to kill competitors, even out competing Vibrio cholerae cells in a bacterial killing assay. V. coralliilyticus possesses a host of virulence factors that contribute to its pathogenicity. It has been found to utilize several proteases, secretion systems, hemolysins, resistance factors, and quorum sensing. Some of the known proteases, zinc-metalloproteases, cause the previously mentioned inactivation of Photosystem II in coral photosynthetic endosymbionts (Symbiodinium) leading to coral beaching. Known secretion systems include Type III, Type IV and Type VI. Spinard et al. made note of several metalloprotease and hemolysin genes in the draft genome sequence published in 2015, several of which resembled proteins of known function found in a related pathogen, Vibrio anguillarum.

== Treatments ==
Vibrio coralliilyticus has been studied quite extensively since its discovery and as such, several potential treatments for infected organisms have been proposed. In a publication by Zhao et al. in 2018 use of a probiotic organism, Phaobacter inhibens strain S4, was proposed as a potential solution to V. coralliilyticus infection in larval oysters. The S4 strain was able to inhibit production of proteases by the Vibrios and slow their growth using antibiotic compounds as well. Another proposed solution, directed towards coral pathogenicity, is the use of phage therapy to prevent the spread of the bacteria to neighboring corals.
