= Vibrio fluvialis =

Scientific classification
- Domain: Bacteria
- Kingdom: Pseudomonadati
- Phylum: Pseudomonadota
- Class: Gammaproteobacteria
- Order: Vibrionales
- Family: Vibrionaceae
- Genus: Vibrio
- Species: V. fluvialis

Binomial name
- Vibrio fluvialis Lee et al., 1981

Synonyms
- Allomonas enterica Kalina et al. 1984

Species of bacterium

Vibrio fluvialis is a water-borne bacterium first isolated from patients with severe diarrhoea in Bahrain in the 1970s by A. L. Furniss and his colleagues, and is considered to be an emerging pathogen with the potential to have a significant impact on public health. Upon discovery, this organism was considered to be similar to both Vibrio and Aeromonas species, but was ultimately determined to be more closely related to Vibrio. V. fluvialis can be found in salt waters globally and also has the potential to infect both humans and a variety of crustaceans.
