= Vibrio cholerae ToxT activated RNAs =

In molecular biology, Vibrio cholerae ToxT activated RNAs are small RNAs which are produced by the bacterium Vibrio cholerae. They are regulated by the transcriptional activator ToxT and may play a role in V. cholerae virulence. Two ToxT activated RNAs have been described: TarA (ToxT activated RNA A) and TarB (ToxT activated RNA B).

== TarA ==
The TarA small RNA regulates PtsG, a glucose transporter involved in the regulation of glucose uptake. Regulation of PtsG by TarA may be dependent upon the Hfq protein, an RNA chaperone.

== TarB ==
TarB inhibits the expression of Toxin coregulated pilus biosynthesis protein F (TcpF). It does not act in conjunction with Hfq.

== See also ==
- Vibrio regulatory RNA of OmpA
- Qrr RNA
