= PAGEV RNA motif =

RNA structure

PAGEV
- Consensus secondary structure and sequence conservation of PAGEV RNA

Identifiers
- Symbol: PAGEV
- Rfam: RF03037

Other data
- RNA type: Gene; sRNA
- SO: SO:0001263
- PDB structures: PDBe

The Plasmid-Associated gamma-Proteobacteria Especially Vibrionales RNA motif (PAGEV RNA motif) is a conserved RNA structure that was discovered by bioinformatics. PAGEV motif RNAs are found in Gammaproteobacteria, especially within the order Vibrionales.

PAGEV RNAs likely have a function that relates to plasmids, and one PAGEV RNA is predicted to reside in the plasmid pPMA4326D, which was found in a strain of Pseudomonas syringae. This RNA overlaps a region that was predicted as being essential for replication of the plasmid. However, the prediction was based on the sequence's similarity to a part of another plasmid, and yet no PAGEV RNA is predicted in this other plasmid. As yet, the function of PAGEV RNAs is unknown. Although the PAGEV motif was published as an RNA candidate, its potential relationship to plasmid replication leaves open the possibility that it functions as a single-stranded DNA. In terms of secondary structure, RNA and DNA are difficult to distinguish when only sequence information is available. Single-stranded DNA can occur during plasmid replication.
