= Vibrio furnissii =

Scientific classification
- Domain: Bacteria
- Kingdom: Pseudomonadati
- Phylum: Pseudomonadota
- Class: Gammaproteobacteria
- Order: Vibrionales
- Family: Vibrionaceae
- Genus: Vibrio
- Species: V. furnissii

Binomial name
- Vibrio furnissii Brenner et al., 1983

Species of bacterium

Vibrio furnissii is a Gram-negative, rod-shaped bacterium. Its type strain is ATCC 35016 (= CDC B3215). V. furnissii is aerogenic (gas-producing), and uses L-rhamnose, L-arginine, L-arabinose, maltose, and D-mannitol, but not L-lysine, L-ornithine, or lactose. It has been isolated from patients with gastroenteritis, bacteremia, skin lesions, and sepsis.
