= Vibrio casei =

Scientific classification
- Domain: Bacteria
- Kingdom: Pseudomonadati
- Phylum: Pseudomonadota
- Class: Gammaproteobacteria
- Order: Vibrionales
- Family: Vibrionaceae
- Genus: Vibrio
- Species: V. casei

Binomial name
- Vibrio casei Bleicher et al. 2009

Species of bacterium

Vibrio casei is a Gram-negative species of bacterium in the genus Vibrio. Strains of this species were originally isolated from portions of French soft cheese. Genetically similar species and strains have been found in American cheesemaking plants. This species is catalase-positive and oxidase-positive.
