= Vibrio metschnikovii =

Scientific classification
- Domain: Bacteria
- Kingdom: Pseudomonadati
- Phylum: Pseudomonadota
- Class: Gammaproteobacteria
- Order: Vibrionales
- Family: Vibrionaceae
- Genus: Vibrio
- Species: V. metschnikovii

Binomial name
- Vibrio metschnikovii Gamaleia 1888

Species of bacterium

Vibrio metschnikovii is a gram-negative species of bacteria found in freshwater and marine environments. V. metschnikovii is an emergent pathogen in humans, causing gastrointestinal disease and wound infections.

V. metschnikovii was named in honor of Russian biologist, Élie Metchnikoff.

== Characteristics ==
Vibrio metschnikovii is a halophilic gram-negative rod. It is a facultatively anaerobic bacterium and motile through a single polar flagellum. The species is catalase positive. V. metschnikovii is the only pathogenic Vibrio that is oxidase negative. V. metschnikovii grows readily on routine laboratory including TCBS agar and blood agar. Unlike most other Vibrio, V. metschnikovii is unable to reduce nitrate.

== Disease ==
Vibrio metschnikovii is an infrequent cause of disease in humans, with 13 cases reported between 1981 and 2014. In 2019, there were six reported cases of V. metschnikovii infections in the US in 2019.
