= Vibrio ichthyoenteri =

Scientific classification
- Domain: Bacteria
- Kingdom: Pseudomonadati
- Phylum: Pseudomonadota
- Class: Gammaproteobacteria
- Order: Vibrionales
- Family: Vibrionaceae
- Genus: Vibrio
- Species: V. ichthyoenteri

Binomial name
- Vibrio ichthyoenteri Ishimaru et al., 1996

Species of bacterium

Vibrio ichthyoenteri is a species of marine bacteria within the genus Vibrio. This species was first isolated from olive flounder(Paralichthys olivaceus) in Japan and has since been recognized as an important bacterial pathogen in marine aquaculture.

== Characteristics ==
Vibrio ichthyoenteri are gram-negative, facultatively anaerobic bacteria that are motile through a single polar flagellum. Similar to other members of the genus, this species is glucose fermenting, oxidase-positive, catalase-positive, and susceptible to the vibriostatic agent O/129. Unlike most other Vibrio, this species lacks chitinase activity.

== Aquaculture ==
Vibrio ichthyoenteri is a notable cause of bacterial infection in aquaculture, particularly flounder and turbot. V. ichythyoenteri infections are unique in that intestinal infection only develops in larval fish. Infected fish may present with intestinal necrosis, ascites, and sepsis. Antibiotics are an effective treatment method, although antibiotic resistance in Vibrionaceae are emerging.

Vaccines are currently being investigated as a potential preventative measure against V. icthyoenteri infections.
