= Vibrio tapetis =

Scientific classification
- Domain: Bacteria
- Kingdom: Pseudomonadati
- Phylum: Pseudomonadota
- Class: Gammaproteobacteria
- Order: Vibrionales
- Family: Vibrionaceae
- Genus: Vibrio
- Species: V. tapetis

Binomial name
- Vibrio tapetis Borrego et al. 1996

Species of bacterium

Vibrio tapetis is a Gram-negative, rod-shaped bacterium, the causative agent of the brown ring disease that affects cultured clams. B1090 (CECT 4600) is the type strain.
