= Vibrio azureus =

Scientific classification
- Domain: Bacteria
- Kingdom: Pseudomonadati
- Phylum: Pseudomonadota
- Class: Gammaproteobacteria
- Order: Vibrionales
- Family: Vibrionaceae
- Genus: Vibrio
- Species: V. azureus

Binomial name
- Vibrio azureus Yoshizawa, Wada, Kita-Tsukamoto, Ikemoto, Yokota & Kogure, 2009

Species belonging to genus Vibrio

Vibrio azureus is a gram negative, oxidase and catalase positive marine bacterium. It is commonly found in marine environments and was isolated from marine sponges of the Saint Martin's Island area of the Bay of Bengal, Bangladesh. Colonies are medium-sized, round and whitish; individual bacteria have a curved rod shape and are motile. It has been observed to emit a blue light using an additional blue-fluorescent protein.
