= Vibrio ponticus =

Scientific classification
- Domain: Bacteria
- Kingdom: Pseudomonadati
- Phylum: Pseudomonadota
- Class: Gammaproteobacteria
- Order: Vibrionales
- Family: Vibrionaceae
- Genus: Vibrio
- Species: V. ponticus

Binomial name
- Vibrio ponticus Macian et al., 2004

Species of bacterium

Vibrio ponticus is a species of gram-negative rod-shaped bacterium from the genus Vibrio within the family Vibrionaceae. V. ponticus is a marine bacterium. This species has been reported in both environmental and aquaculture contexts, with evidence supporting a role in fish disease.

== Taxonomy ==
Vibrio ponticus was first described by Macián et al. in 2004 following its isolation from Mediterranean seawater. Phylogenetic analysis based on 16S rRNA sequencing places V. ponticus within the genus Vibrio and distinguishes it from closely related species such as V. fluvialis.

== Ecology ==
Vibrio ponticus has been isolated from seawater and is considered part of the natural marine microbiota.

== Pathogenicity ==
Vibrio ponticus is a rare cause of infectious gastroenteritis in the United States. Transmission typically occurs through consumption of contaminated seafood.

Vibrio ponticus has been increasingly recognized in aquaculture settings and has been associated with disease in marine fish species. Infected fish may symptoms including skin lesions, hemorrhage, and septicemia.
