= Vibrio nigripulchritudo =

Scientific classification
- Domain: Bacteria
- Kingdom: Pseudomonadati
- Phylum: Pseudomonadota
- Class: Gammaproteobacteria
- Order: Vibrionales
- Family: Vibrionaceae
- Genus: Vibrio
- Species: V. nigripulchritudo

Binomial name
- Vibrio nigripulchritudo (Baumann et al., 1971) Baumann et al., 1980

Species of bacterium

Vibrio nigripulchritudo is a species of gram-negative, rod-shaped bacterium from the order Vibrionales. V. nigripulchritudo is a notable pathogen of farmed shrimp.

== Taxonomy ==
The species was first described as Beneckea nigripulchritudo in 1971. However, following the abolition of the genus Beneckea, the species was moved to the genus Vibrio where it currently remains.

== Aquaculture ==
Vibrio nigripulchritudo was first identified as an aquaculture pathogen in 1995, following its isolation from diseased shrimp in New Caledonia. Outbreaks and mass mortality due to V. nigripulchritudo have also been reported in shrimp farms in Japan.
