= Vibrio mytili =

Scientific classification
- Domain: Bacteria
- Kingdom: Pseudomonadati
- Phylum: Pseudomonadota
- Class: Gammaproteobacteria
- Order: Vibrionales
- Family: Vibrionaceae
- Genus: Vibrio
- Species: V. mytili

Binomial name
- Vibrio mytili Pujalte et al. 1993

Species of bacterium

Vibrio mytili is a Gram-negative species of bacterium in the genus Vibrio. Strains of this species were originally isolated from mussels harvested in the Atlantic Ocean near the coast of Spain.
