= Vibrio cyclitrophicus =

Scientific classification
- Domain: Bacteria
- Kingdom: Pseudomonadati
- Phylum: Pseudomonadota
- Class: Gammaproteobacteria
- Order: Vibrionales
- Family: Vibrionaceae
- Genus: Vibrio
- Species: V. cyclitrophicus

Binomial name
- Vibrio cyclitrophicus Hedlund & Staley, 2001

Species of bacterium

Vibrio cyclitrophicus (previously known as Vibrio cyclotrophicus ) is a polycyclic aromatic hydrocarbon (PAH)-degrading marine bacterium. The type strain is P-2P44^{T} (=ATCC 700982^{T}=PICC 106644^{T}).

== Description ==
Its cells are rod-shaped, some cells being curved. A high percentage of cells are motile during exponential growth, and a few cells are motile during stationary phase. Cells possess either one or two polar or subpolar flagella. Exponential-phase cells measured 0.6-5.0 μm. Some cells form involution bodies during the stationary phase.
