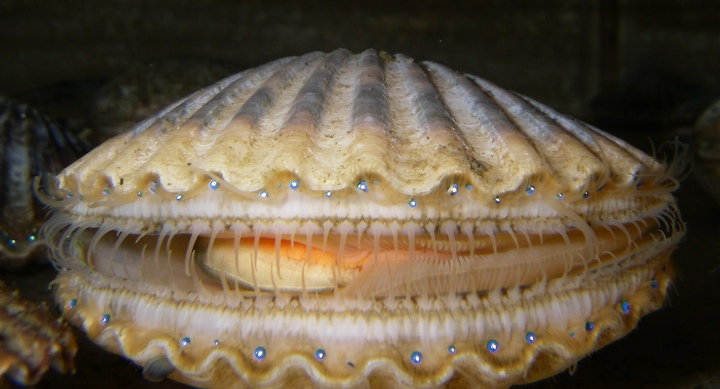
- A live Argopecten irradians

Conservation status
- Secure (NatureServe)

Scientific classification
- Kingdom: Animalia
- Phylum: Mollusca
- Class: Bivalvia
- Order: Pectinida
- Family: Pectinidae
- Genus: Argopecten
- Species: A. irradians

Binomial name
- Argopecten irradians (Lamarck, 1819)

Subspecies
- See text

= Argopecten irradians =

Argopecten irradians Temporal range: Miocene – present

Species of bivalve

Argopecten irradians, formerly classified as Aequipecten irradians, common names Atlantic bay scallop, bay scallop, and blue-eyed scallop, is a species of scallop in the family Pectinidae. An edible saltwater bivalve, it is native to the northwest Atlantic from Cape Cod to the Gulf of Mexico.

Right and left valve of the same specimens:

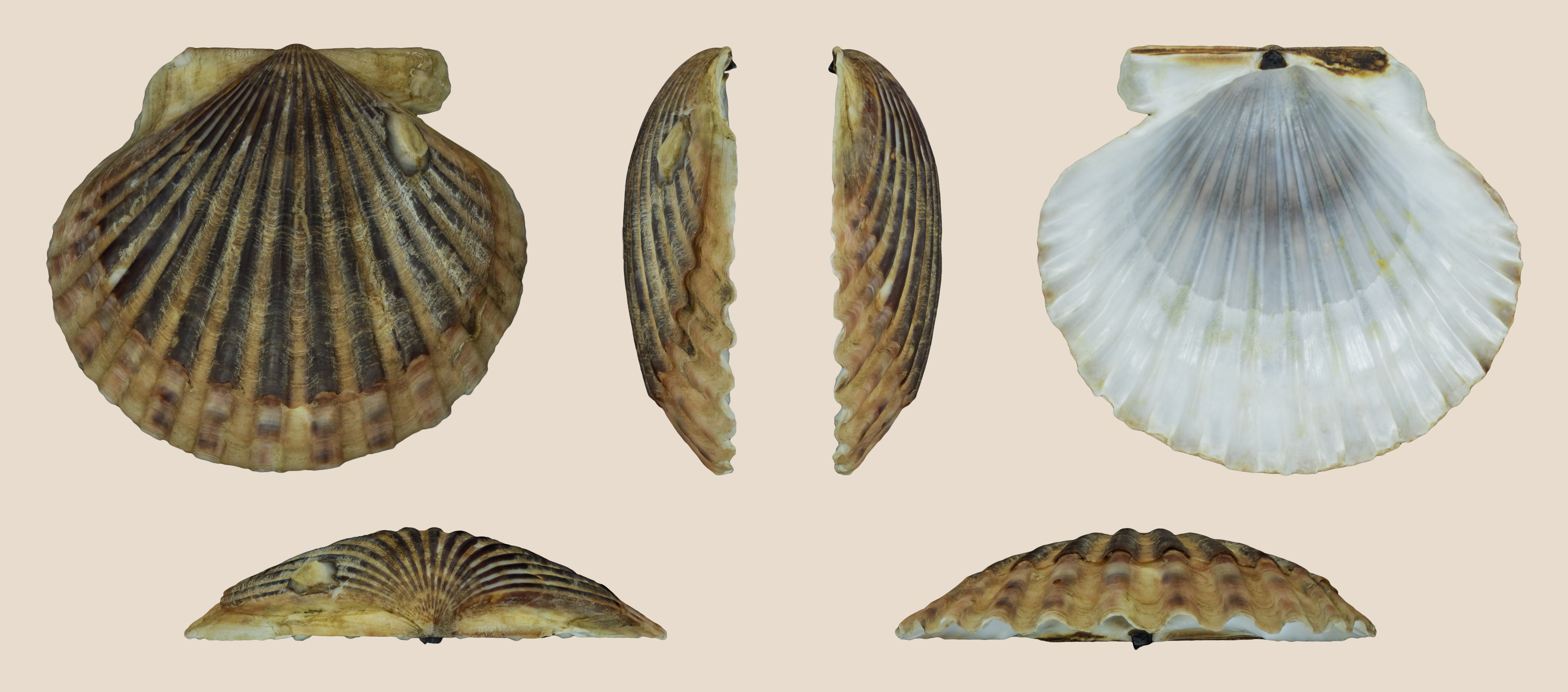
Right valve

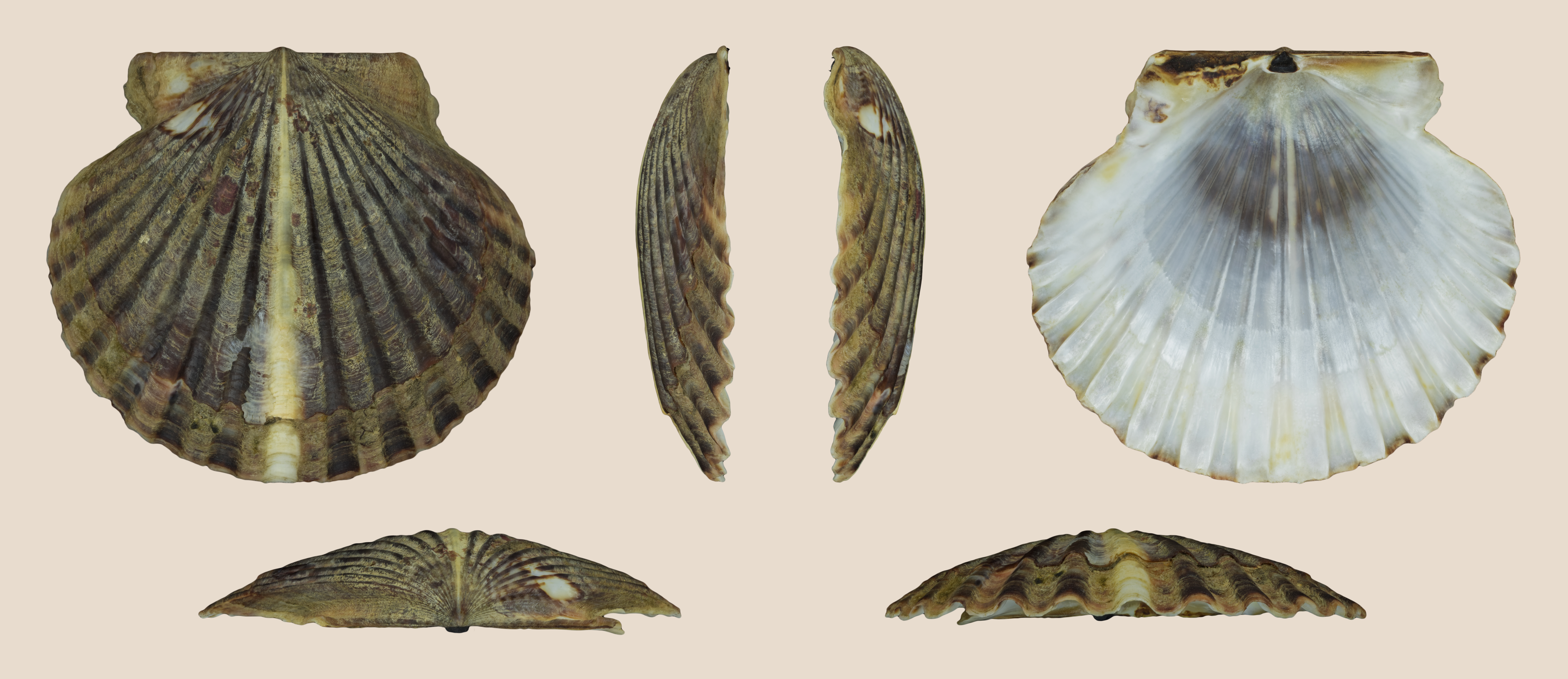
Left valve
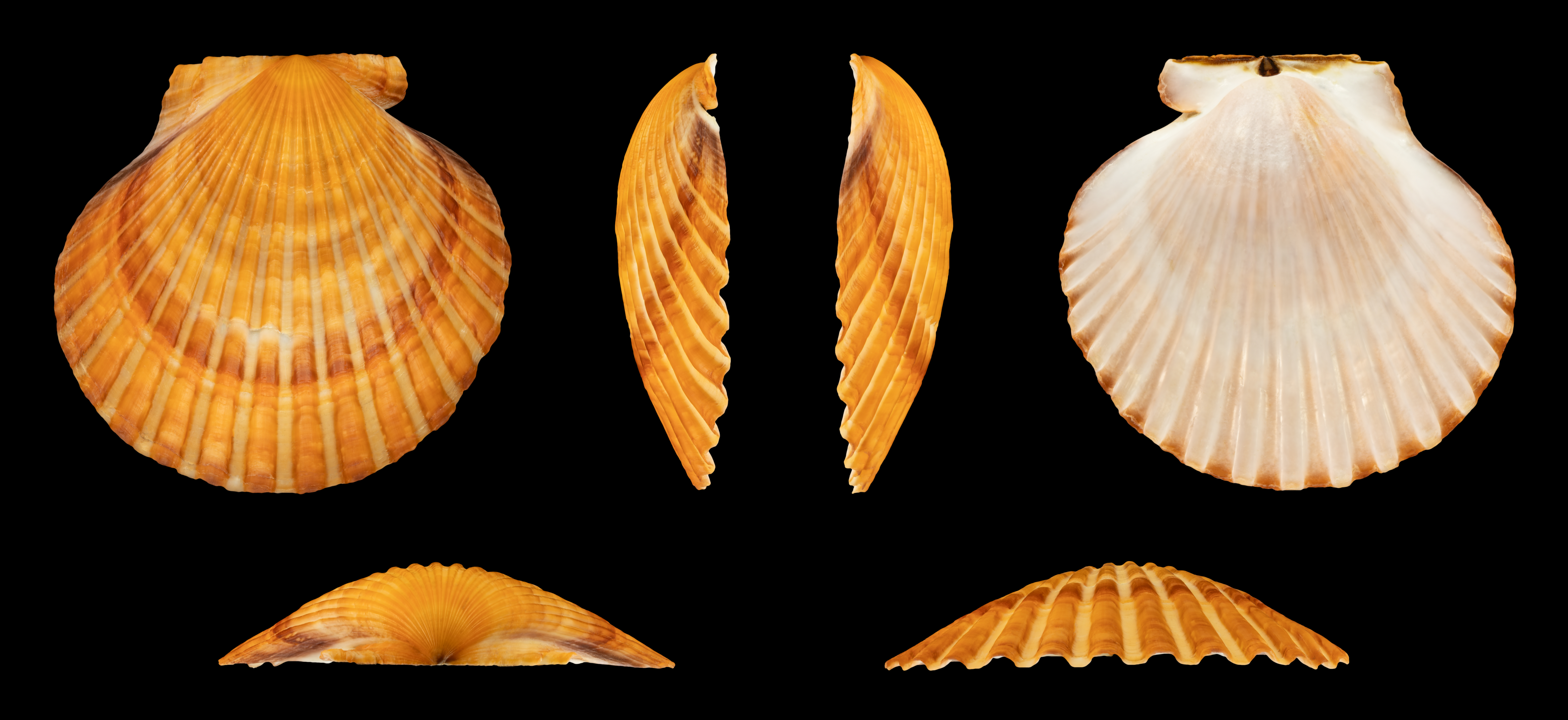
Right valve

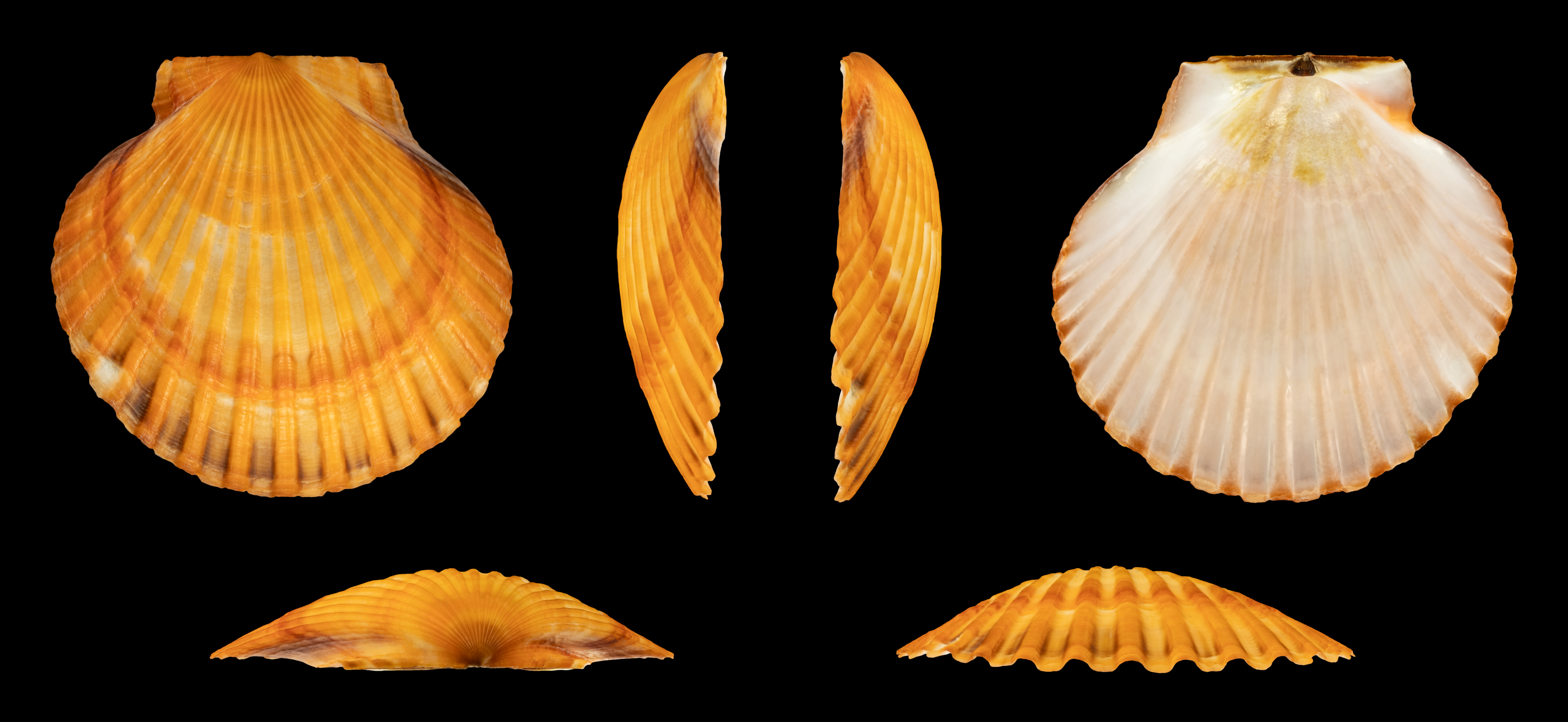
Left valve

== Biology ==
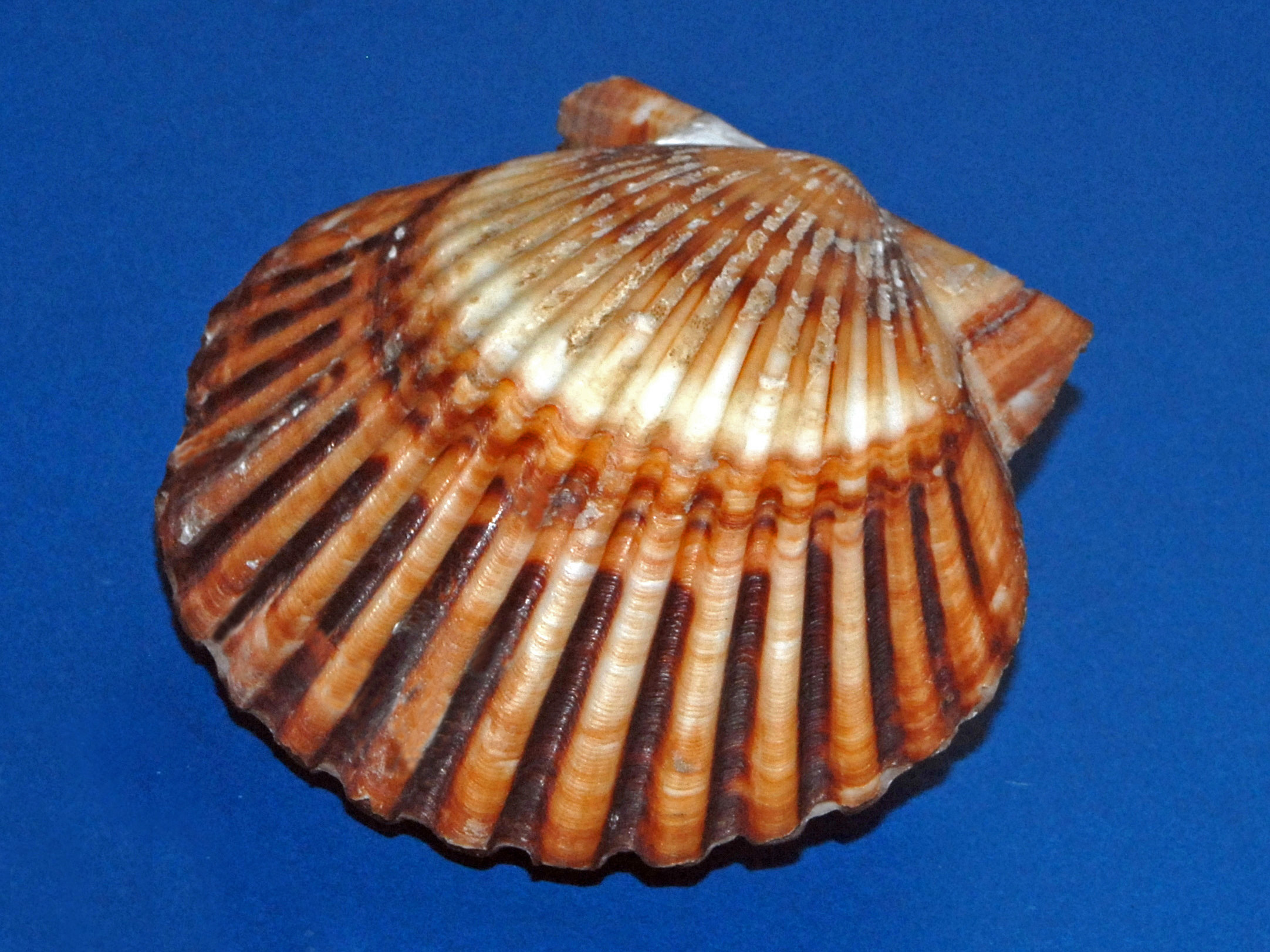
From Bermuda, at Milan Natural History Museum

=== Development ===
At the northern extreme of its range in Massachusetts, germ and gonial cells complete and begin development in winter and early spring. At the southern extreme the timeline is very different, with cytoplasmic growth stages found to occur in July in Tarpon Springs, Florida, when the water approaches its highest temperatures of the year.

=== Immunity ===
AiPGRP is a peptidoglycan recognition protein (PGRP). Its cDNA was cloned by Ni et al. 2007 and is the first bivalve PGRP to be cloned. AiGal1 is a galectin discovered by Song et al. 2010, CfToll-1 is a toll-like receptor (TLR) shared with other bivalves. It was first found in this scallop by Song et al. 2006. Song 2006 also found an inhibitor of κB (IκB). AiBD is the first big defensin cloned from this scallop. The gene is 531 nucleotides and the polypeptide product is 122 amino acids. Recombinant AiBD is an antimicrobial for Gram-positive bacteria, Gram-negative bacteria, and fungi. Manganese superoxide dismutase (MnSOD) mRNA expression increases in the gill and mantle in response to Vibrio anguillarum.

== Bay scallop fishery ==
This species of scallop used to support a large wild fishery on the East Coast of the United States, but since the 1950s it has decreased greatly. This is apparently the result of several negative influences, one of which is a reduction in sea grasses (to which bay scallop spat attach) due to increased coastal development and concomitant nutrient runoff. By contrast, the Atlantic sea scallop (Placopecten magellanicus) is at historically high levels of abundance because the Magnuson-Stevens Fishery Conservation and Management Reauthorization Act of 2006 put a limit on catch numbers and led to a recovery from overfishing.

Scallop farming is a million-dollar industry in Canada, with British Columbia producing 85% of the country's farmed scallops. Scallop aquaculture is currently being practiced in Florida. They were introduced into China in the 1980s and are the basis of a vibrant aquaculture industry in that country.

== Subspecies ==
This species has five different subspecies:

- A. i. amplicostatus (Dall, 1898)
- A. i. concentricus (Say, 1822)
- A. i. irradians (Lamarck, 1819)
- A. i. sablensis (Clarke, 1965) - a fossil subspecies
- A. i. taylorae Petuch, 1987 - the southern bay scallop
