= Vibrio hippocampi =

Scientific classification
- Domain: Bacteria
- Kingdom: Pseudomonadati
- Phylum: Pseudomonadota
- Class: Gammaproteobacteria
- Order: Vibrionales
- Family: Vibrionaceae
- Genus: Vibrio
- Species: V. hippocampi

Binomial name
- Vibrio hippocampi Balcázar et al., 2010

Species of bacterium

Vibrio hippocampi is a species of gram-negative bacteria from the order Vibrionales. The species was first isolated from the feces of wild seahorses (Hippocampus guttulatus) captured in Spain. Similar to other members of the genus, V. hippocampi is a facultatively anaerobic gram-negative rod. The species is positive for catalase, oxidase, and reduction of nitrate to nitrite.

V. hippocampi grows readily on trypticase soy agar, producing circular colonies that are 1.5 to 2 millimetres (0.059 to 0.079 in) in diameter. The species has an optimum growth temperature of 20 °C (68 °F).
