= Vibrio natriegens =

Scientific classification
- Domain: Bacteria
- Kingdom: Pseudomonadati
- Phylum: Pseudomonadota
- Class: Gammaproteobacteria
- Order: Vibrionales
- Family: Vibrionaceae
- Genus: Vibrio
- Species: V. natriegens

Binomial name
- Vibrio natriegens

Synonyms
- Pseudomonas natriegens Beneckea natriegens

Species of bacterium

Vibrio natriegens is a Gram-negative marine bacterium. It was first isolated from salt marsh mud. It is a salt-loving organism (halophile) requiring about 2 % NaCl for growth. The species grows well in the presence of sodium ions, which appear to stimulate growth in Vibrio species, to stabilise the cell membrane, and to affect sodium-dependent transport and mobility. Under optimum conditions, and all nutrients provided, the doubling time of V. natriegens can be less than 10 minutes. V. natriegens can live successfully and rapidly divide in its coastal areas due to its large range of metabolic fuel. Recent research has displayed that Vibrio natriegens has a flexible metabolism, which allows it to consume a large variety of carbon substrates, reduce nitrates, and even fix nitrogen from the atmosphere under nitrogen-limiting and anaerobic conditions. In the laboratory, the growth medium can be easily changed, thus affecting the growth rate of a culture. V. natriegens is commonly found in estuarine mud.

== Aquaculture and antibiotic resistance ==
Many strains of Vibrio, including natriegens, are pathogenic against farmed aquacultures such as the abalone (sea snail, marine gastropod mollusc) and have recently destroyed farmed abalones when aquacultures get infected. In response, fishers have taken to inoculating tanks with large amounts of antibiotics, which has resulted in Vibrio natriegens developing a potent antibiotic resistance to many drugs. In a recent study, the AbY-1805 strain of Vibrio natriegens was shown to be completely resistant against 17 of the 32 tested antibiotics and at least partially resistant against 22 of the 32.

== Biochemical characteristics of V. natriegens ==
Colony, morphological, physiological, and biochemical characteristics of Vibrio natriegens are shown in the Table below.

Test type	Test	Characteristics
Colony characters	Size	Medium
Colony characters	Type	Round
Colony characters	Color	Whitish
Colony characters	Shape	Convex
Morphological characters	Shape	Vibrio
Physiological characters	Motility	+
Physiological characters	Growth at 6.5% NaCl	+
Biochemical characters	Gram's staining	–
Biochemical characters	Oxidase	+
Biochemical characters	Catalase	+
Biochemical characters	Oxidative-Fermentative	Oxidative
Biochemical characters	Motility	+
Biochemical characters	Methyl red	–
Biochemical characters	Voges-Proskauer	–
Biochemical characters	Indole	–
Biochemical characters	H_{2}S Production	+
Biochemical characters	Urease	+
Biochemical characters	Nitrate reductase	+
Biochemical characters	β-Galactosidase	+
Hydrolysis of	Gelatin	+
Hydrolysis of	Aesculin	+
Hydrolysis of	Casein	+
Hydrolysis of	Tween 40	+
Hydrolysis of	Tween 60	+
Hydrolysis of	Tween 80	+
Acid production from	Glycerol	+
Acid production from	Galactose	+
Acid production from	D-Glucose	+
Acid production from	D-Fructose	V
Acid production from	D-Mannose	V
Acid production from	Mannitol	V
Acid production from	N-Acetylglucosamine	+
Acid production from	Amygdalin	–
Acid production from	Maltose	+
Acid production from	D-Melibiose	–
Acid production from	D-Trehalose	–
Acid production from	Glycogen	+
Acid production from	D-Turanose	+

Note: + = Positive, – =Negative, V =Variable (+/–)

== Biotechnological uses ==
Owing to its rapid growth rate, ability to grow on inexpensive carbon sources, and capacity to secrete proteins into the growth media, efforts are underway to leverage this species as a host for molecular biology and biotechnology applications. Recently, V. natriegens crude extract has been shown by multiple research groups to be a promising platform for cell-free expression. Scientists are also hoping that Vibrio natriegens, with its incredible growth speed, will make microbial experiments in outer space, where time is an extremely valuable asset, much quicker. Interestingly, it has been shown that Vibrio natriegens might grow even faster in space despite its incredibly quick doubling speed on Earth. An experiment displayed that after 24 hours of growth the Vibrio cells grown in zero gravity were 60 times denser than those grown in full gravity, possibly attributable to an extended exponential growth phase in low-gravity conditions.
