= Vibrio pelagius =

Scientific classification
- Domain: Bacteria
- Kingdom: Pseudomonadati
- Phylum: Pseudomonadota
- Class: Gammaproteobacteria
- Order: Vibrionales
- Family: Vibrionaceae
- Genus: Vibrio
- Species: V. pelagius

Binomial name
- Vibrio pelagius (Baumann et al., 1971) Baumann et al., 1981

Synonyms
- Beneckea pelagia Baumann et al., 1971; Listonella pelagia (Baumann et al., 1971) MacDonell & Colwell, 1986

Species of bacterium

Vibrio pelagius is a gram negative, oxidase and catalase positive marine bacterium described in 1971. It is commonly found in marine environments and has been isolated from marine sponges of the Saint Martin's Island area of the Bay of Bengal, Bangladesh. Colonies are round and whitish, of medium size; individual bacteria have a curved rod shape and are motile.
