= Vibrio diabolicus =

Scientific classification
- Domain: Bacteria
- Kingdom: Pseudomonadati
- Phylum: Pseudomonadota
- Class: Gammaproteobacteria
- Order: Vibrionales
- Family: Vibrionaceae
- Genus: Vibrio
- Species: V. diabolicus

Binomial name
- Vibrio diabolicus Raguénès et al. 1997

Species of bacterium

Vibrio diabolicus is a polysaccharide-secreting, gram-negative bacterium from the genus Vibrio. This species was first isolated from a deep-sea hydrothermal vent polychaete annelid, Alvinella pompejana. V. diabolicus has since been isolated from several species of shellfish. It is facultatively anaerobic, heterotrophic, and mesophilic.
