= Vibrio ordalii =

Scientific classification
- Domain: Bacteria
- Kingdom: Pseudomonadati
- Phylum: Pseudomonadota
- Class: Gammaproteobacteria
- Order: Vibrionales
- Family: Vibrionaceae
- Genus: Vibrio
- Species: V. ordalii

Binomial name
- Vibrio ordalii Schiewe et al. 1982

Species of bacterium

Vibrio ordalii is a Gram-negative, rod-shaped bacterium. It causes vibriosis in fish. Its type strain is ATCC 33509 (=DF3K =Dom F3 kid).
