= Vibrio aerogenes =

Scientific classification
- Domain: Bacteria
- Kingdom: Pseudomonadati
- Phylum: Pseudomonadota
- Class: Gammaproteobacteria
- Order: Vibrionales
- Family: Vibrionaceae
- Genus: Vibrio
- Species: V. aerogenes

Binomial name
- Vibrio aerogenes Shieh, Chen & Chiu, 2000

Species of bacterium

Vibrio aerogenes is a gram-negative organism that is rod-shaped and has a two-sheathed flagella that is found on one side of the cell that makes it motile. When it is grown on polypeptone-yeast (PY) plate medium, the colonies are usually round and flat. It is an organism that is mesophilic which means it likes temperatures that are between 20 and 45 °C. In addition, it is facultatively anaerobic, which means it can survive with or without oxygen. This is a marine bacteria that is most commonly found in temperatures between 30 °C and 35 °C and pH 6–7. It requires Na^{+} to grow and this is what makes the marine environment a necessity for this organism. V. aerogenes can ferment glucose and a few other carbohydrates to yield organic acids.

When this bacteria is cultured, the medium must include Na^{+} but there are not any other vitamins that are needed. One possible medium that can be used is called BACTO MARINE BROTH (DIFCO 2216) (DSMZ Medium 514) and after inoculation the bacteria is grown at 28 °C. Another medium V. aerogenes can be grown on is called MEDIUM 13- Marine agar and after this medium is inoculated, the bacteria can grow at 25 °C. The bacteria can also be grown on PY medium which has the proper amount of NaCl added. The medium has to contain 4% NaCl, in order for the bacteria to properly grow. The organism can be collected from seagrass bed sediment, specifically in the Nanwan Bay, in Taiwan. This environment provides the bacteria with the perfect temperature, pH, and nutrient level. This organism lives on aquatic plants and has mostly only been isolated in this specific bay. This organism is a strain that most likely belongs to the species Vibrio and therefore the family, Vibrionaceae. The sequence of the strain has been shown through phylogenetic analysis to indicate that it has a similar sequence to other Vibrio species. In addition, data shows that this organism could be a new species because the 16S rDNA sequence is at most “96±2%” similar to other Vibrio species. The bacteria is able to use glucose to yield gas and is negative for the oxidase test, which are both quite unique characteristics for the Vibrio species. It is positive for the catalase test. The genome of V. aerogenes consists of 4,567 genes and 4,654 genes. The bacteria's genome has 45.7% GC (guanine-cytosine). The total length of the genome is around 5.25 Mb. There is still not much information and specifics on this organism, but more research is being performed.
