= Vibrio adaptatus =

Scientific classification
- Domain: Bacteria
- Kingdom: Pseudomonadati
- Phylum: Pseudomonadota
- Class: Gammaproteobacteria
- Order: Vibrionales
- Family: Vibrionaceae
- Genus: Vibrio
- Species: V. adaptatus

Binomial name
- Vibrio adaptatus

Species of bacterium

Vibrio adaptatus is the name given to a Gram-negative species of bacteria first described from the ocean by ZoBell and Upham in 1944. It was later shown to be genetically very different from other species of Vibrio (which belongs to Gammaproteobacteria), suggesting it belongs in a different genus, However, it has not been further studied and assigned to a genus, and remains an unclassified bacterial strain within the Alphaproteobacteria, just like Vibrio cyclosites.
