= Catenococcus =

Scientific classification
- Domain: Bacteria
- Kingdom: Pseudomonadati
- Phylum: Pseudomonadota
- Class: Gammaproteobacteria
- Order: Vibrionales
- Family: Vibrionaceae
- Genus: Catenococcus; Sorokin 1994

Type species
- Catenococcus thiocycli

Species
- Catenococcus thiocycli

Genus of bacteria

Catenococcus is a Gram-negative and facultatively anaerobic genus of bacteria from the family of Vibrionaceae with one known species (Catenococcus thiocycli).
