= Echinimonas =

Scientific classification
- Domain: Bacteria
- Kingdom: Pseudomonadati
- Phylum: Pseudomonadota
- Class: Gammaproteobacteria
- Order: Vibrionales
- Family: Vibrionaceae
- Genus: Echinimonas; Nedashkovskaya et al. 2013

Type species
- Echinimonas agarilytica

Species
- E. agarilytica

Genus of bacteria

Echinimonas is a Gram-negative, facultatively anaerobic and motile genus of bacteria from the family of Vibrionaceae with on known species Echinimonas agarilytica. Echinimonas agarilytica has been isolated from the sea urchin Strongylocentrotus intermedius.
