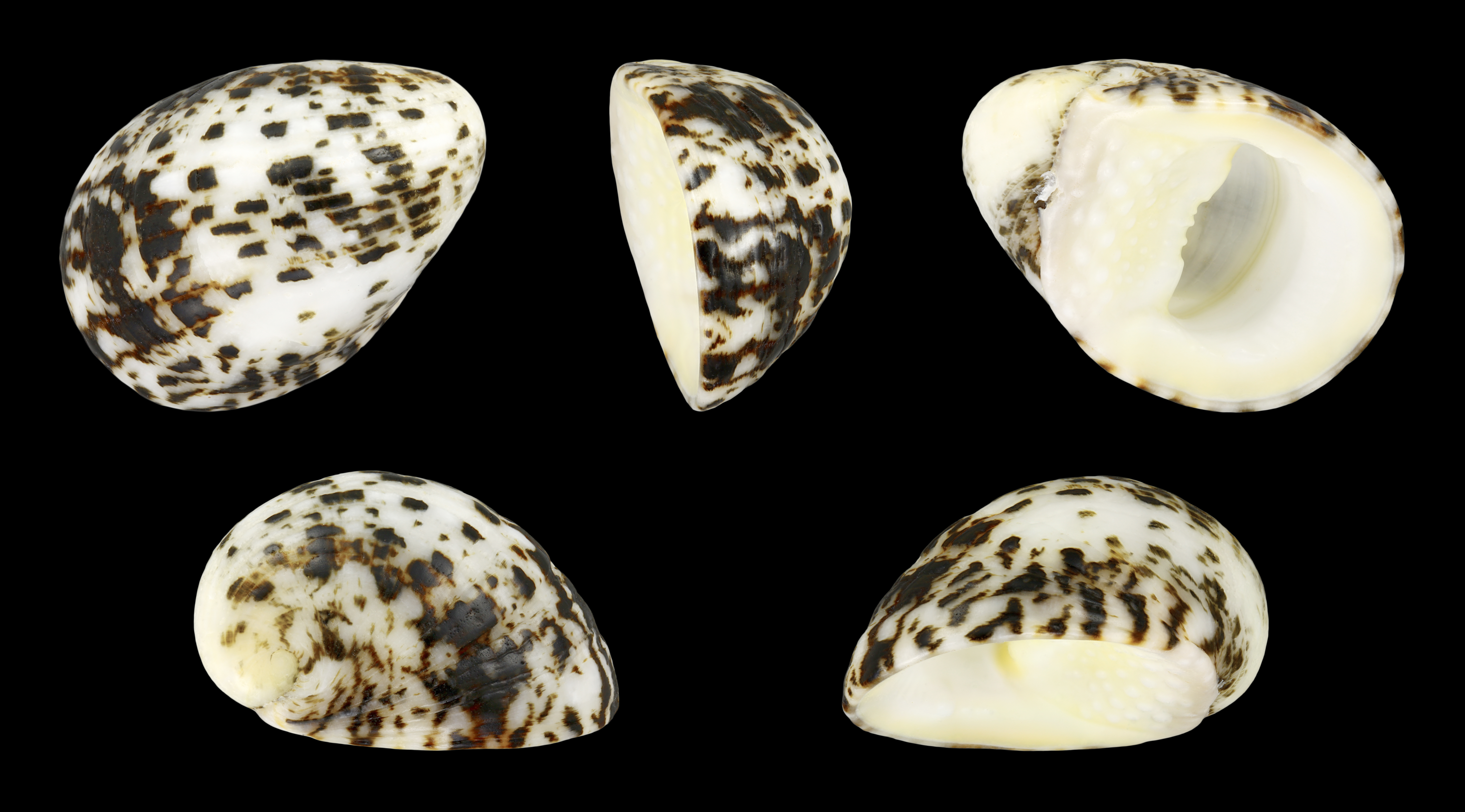

Scientific classification
- Kingdom: Animalia
- Phylum: Mollusca
- Class: Gastropoda
- Order: Cycloneritida
- Family: Neritidae
- Genus: Nerita
- Species: N. albicilla

Binomial name
- Nerita albicilla Linnaeus, 1758

Synonyms
- Nerita (Theliostyla) albicilla Linnaeus, 1758· accepted, alternate representation; Nerita asinina Humphrey, 1797 (unavailable name: published in a work placed on the Official Index); Nerita fasciata Krauss, 1848 (unavailable: a junior homonym of Nerita fasciata O.F. Müller, 1774); Nerita imperfecta Röding, 1798; Nerita ustulata G. B. Sowerby II, 1883; Nerita venusta Dunker, 1844 (junior synonym); Theliostyla albicilla (Linnaeus, 1758)

= Nerita albicilla =

Nerita albicilla Temporal range: Pleistocene–Recent

Species of gastropod

Nerita albicilla, common name the blotched nerite, is a species of sea snail, a marine gastropod mollusk in the family Neritidae.

== Description ==
Nerita albicilla grows up to 4 cm; its shell surface is smooth or with slight transverse ridges; it has small pustules and four weak teeth on the columella. Its outer shell color is variegated black and white, occasionally with three conspicuous bands. The interior is white, with a pinkish-grey, granular operculum.

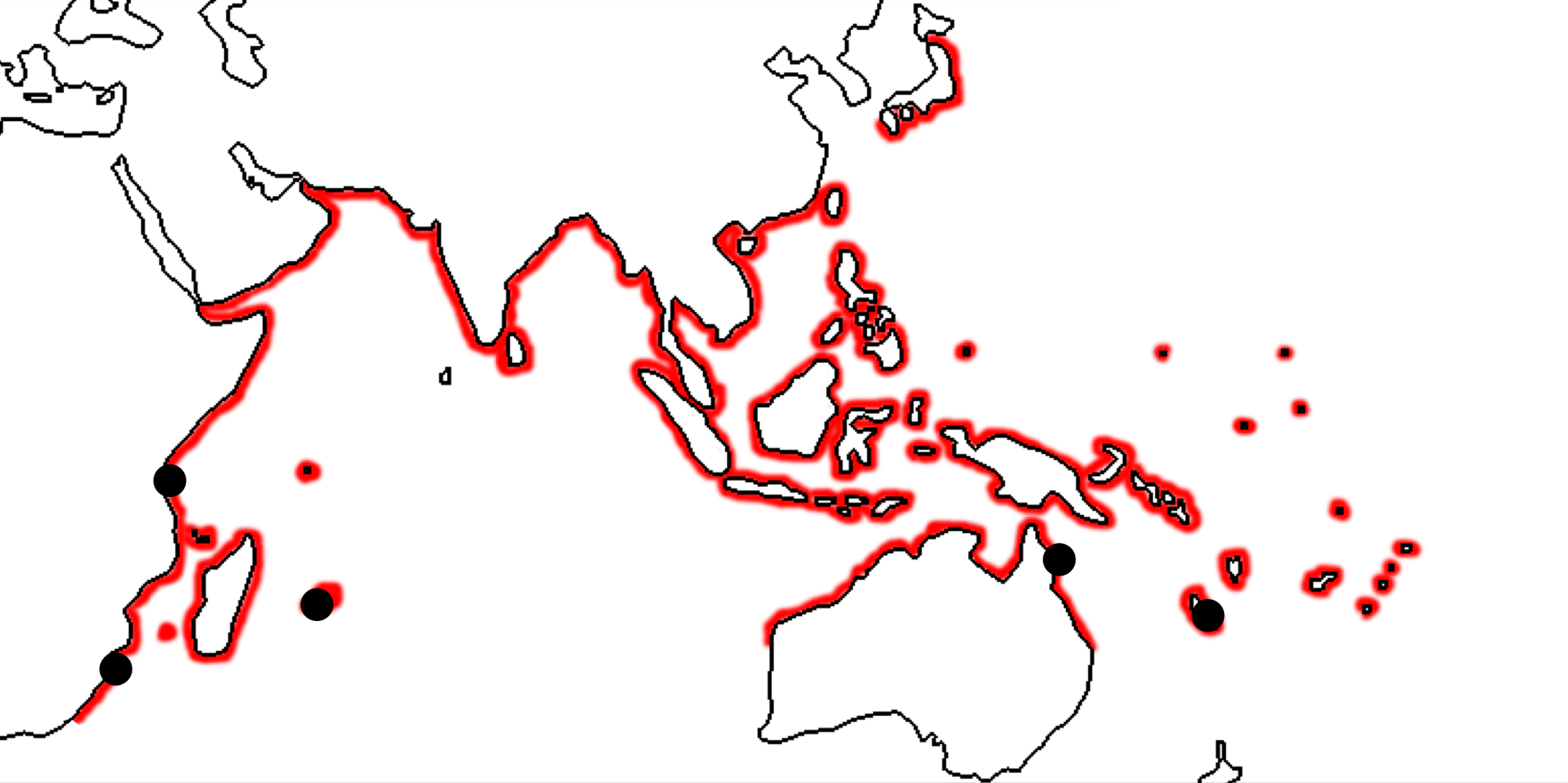
Distribution map of Nerita albicilla.

== Distribution ==
Tropical Indo-Pacific

- Aldabra
- Australia (Kalk, 1958)
- Chagos
- East Coast of South Africa
- Kenya
- Madagascar
- Mascarene Basin
- Mauritius
- Mozambique
- Red Sea
- Seychelles
- Tanzania

== Habitat ==
It is found on rocky cliffs, on rocks in the littoral fringe, and sometimes on mangrove trees.

== Fossil record ==
Fossils of this species have been found in Pleistocene deposits in Djibouti.

== Parasites ==
- Vibrio parahaemolyticus
