= Vibriosis =

- Other names: Vibrio infection, Bath-sore fever
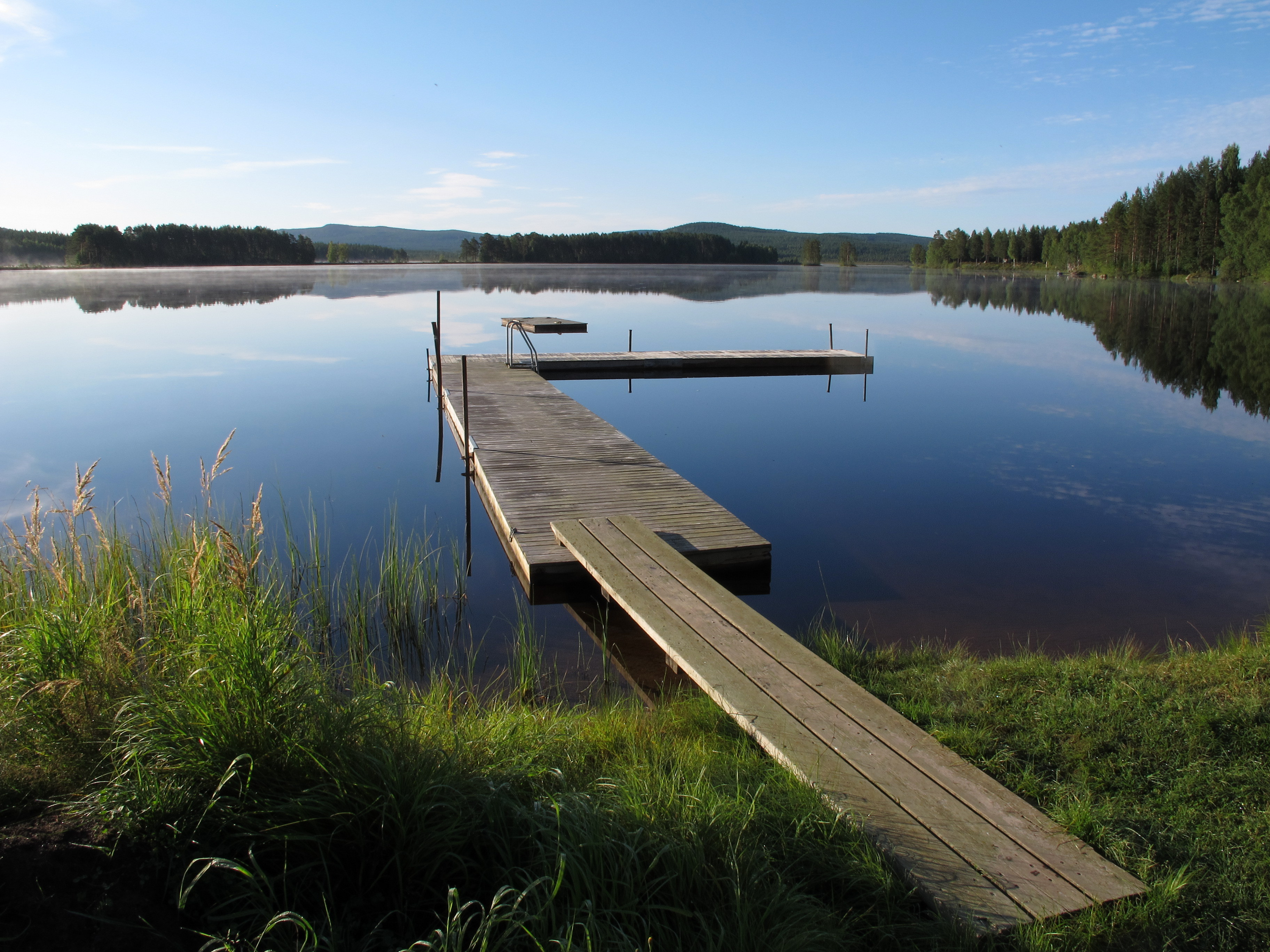
- A swimming jetty in Sweden, where vibriosis is associated with swimming during warm years and good weather.
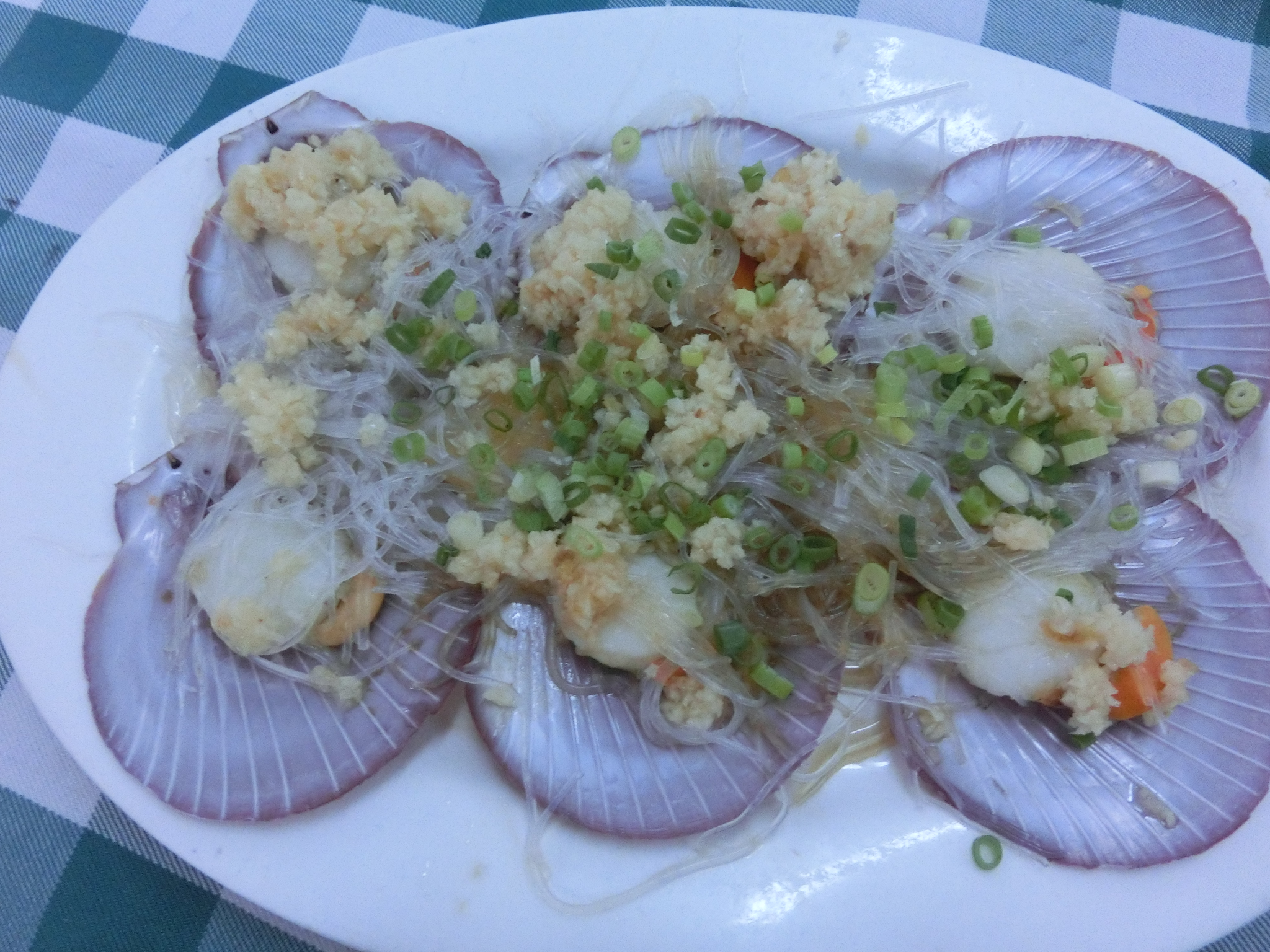
- Undercooked shellfish can also be a source of Vibrio infection, often leading to the milder form of gastrointestinal vibriosis.
- Specialty: Infectious disease
- Symptoms: Diarrhea, abdominal cramps, nausea, vomiting, fever, wound infections
- Complications: Dehydration, sepsis, necrotizing fasciitis
- Usual onset: 12 to 72 hours after exposure
- Duration: Several days to weeks
- Causes: Infection by Vibrio species (V. parahaemolyticus, V. vulnificus, V. alginolyticus)
- Risk factors: Consuming raw/undercooked seafood, exposure to contaminated seawater or brackish water
- Diagnostic method: Stool test, wound culture, blood culture
- Differential diagnosis: Shewanella-infection (though with longer incubation time)
- Prevention: Cooking seafood thoroughly, avoiding exposure of wounds to brackish water or seawater
- Treatment: Oral rehydration therapy, intravenous fluids, antibiotics
- Medication: Doxycycline, ceftazidime
- Prognosis: Generally good with treatment; higher risk of severe outcomes in immunocompromised individuals
- Frequency: Thousands of cases annually in the US
- Deaths: Variable, higher in severe cases involving sepsis

Vibriosis or vibrio infection is an infection caused by bacteria of the genus Vibrio. About a dozen species can cause vibriosis in humans, with the most common in multiple countries across the Northern Hemisphere being Vibrio parahaemolyticus, Vibrio vulnificus, and Vibrio alginolyticus. Vibrio cholerae can also commonly cause vibriosis, though only those strains that do not produce cholera-specific toxins: non-O 1 or non-O 139. Bacteria that produce these toxins are classified by the World Health Organization as causing cholera, which is a more severe disease. Vibriosis is also an animal disease and can cause harm to wild and farmed fish, among others.

== Etymology ==
The genus Vibrio includes various species that can cause illness in humans, including Vibrio parahaemolyticus and Vibrio vulnificus. These bacteria thrive in warm, brackish water and are often found in shellfish such as oysters, clams, and mussels.

== Transmission ==
Vibriosis can be contracted through:

- Consumption of raw or undercooked seafood, particularly shellfish.
- Exposure of open wounds or broken skin to warm seawater or brackish water containing Vibrio bacteria.

== Clinical manifestations ==
The symptoms of vibriosis can vary depending on the species involved:

- Vibrio parahaemolyticus: Leads to gastrointestinal illness, with symptoms such as diarrhea, abdominal cramps, nausea, vomiting, and fever.
- Vibrio vulnificus: Can cause severe wound infections and sepsis, especially in immunocompromised individuals.
- Vibrio alginolyticus: Typically causes wound and ear infections.

== Epidemiology ==
Vibriosis incidence is influenced by environmental factors such as water temperature and salinity. Warmer temperatures, including in relation to global warming, have been linked to increased prevalence of vibriosis as Vibrio bacteria thrive in warmer conditions.

=== Bath-sore fever or bathing fever ===
In some regions, vibriosis is referred to as "bath-sore fever" or "bathing fever" due to its association with warm water activities, especially during unusually warm summers. The term highlights the seasonal nature of the infections, which typically occur during the warmer months when people are more likely to engage in water-related activities.

== Diagnosis ==
Diagnosis of vibriosis involves:

- Clinical evaluation: Based on symptoms and exposure history.
- Laboratory testing: Isolation and identification of Vibrio species from stool, wound, or blood samples.

== Treatment ==
Treatment of vibriosis depends on the severity and type of infection:

- Mild cases: Often resolve without treatment; oral rehydration therapy may be used.
- Severe cases: May require hospitalization, intravenous fluids, and antibiotics such as doxycycline or ceftazidime.

== Prevention ==
Preventive measures to reduce the risk of vibriosis include:

- Food safety: Cooking seafood thoroughly and avoiding raw shellfish.
- Wound care: Avoiding exposure of open wounds to seawater and using waterproof bandages if contact is unavoidable.
- Public health awareness: Educating the public about the risks of vibriosis and safe water practices.

== See also ==
- Cholera
- Foodborne illness
- Sepsis
