= Vibrion =

Vibrion may also refer to: the singular form of vibrio, a genus of anaerobic bacteria with a comma-like shape. Vibrion is an antiquated term for microorganisms, especially pathogenic ones; see Germ theory of disease. The term was specifically used in reference to motile microorganisms, and the name of the genus Vibrio derives from this term. The term is closely tied to the history of the study of cholera. It was used in biological literature between the late 19th century and the 1920s.

== Early Identification and Characterization of Vibrio bacteria ==
Bacteria with the same characteristics as those of the genus Vibrio were discovered independently multiple times, but only later findings were able to connect these bacteria with cholera, tetanus, and other diseases.

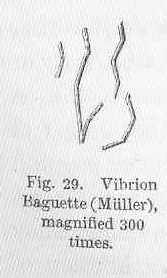
FMIB 50036 Vibrion Babuette (Muller), magnified

Leeuwenhoek may have observed Vibrio bacteria after his discovery of “animalcules” described in his letters to the Royal Society. He described microorganisms with the same appearances and behaviors as bacteria belonging to the genus Vibrio. Bacteria of this genus were later anonymously described as “Capillary Eels” in the 1703 issue of Philosophical Transactions by a “Sir C. H.” because of their thin, wormlike appearance. Additionally, the naturalist O. F. Müller documented eight species of the genus Vibrio in his work on infusoria.

== History of the Term ==
In 1854, the Italian anatomist Filippo Pacini coined the term "vibrions" in a paper he published during the third Cholera pandemic arguing that they were the main agents causing cholera. He drew his conclusion from his observations of the thin, wormlike bacteria present in the blood and stool of cholera patients, especially characteristic of late-stage infections. The Vibrio cholerae identified by Pacini were rediscovered by Robert Koch in 1884, who was unaware of Pacini's work; he called them “Comma Bacillus” and received worldwide fame as a result of his discovery.

The term “vibrion” was subsequently used by Louis Pasteur in 1861 in naming a bacterium he discovered, Vibryon butyrique, which was capable of surviving in an environment without oxygen. This bacterium was then identified as the same bacterium which had been discovered by two other scientists and renamed Clostridium butyricum.

By the 20th century "vibrion" came to be used as a general term for motile microorganisms with an elongated, wormlike shape associated with pathogenic illnesses such as cholera and tetanus. It was also incorporated in the names created for several bacteria by microbiologists at the time, such as in the name "Vibrion septique" from a 1922 paper in The Journal of Medical Research. In an issue of the journal Modern Medicine from 1893, the term "cholera vibrion" is used to refer to Vibrio cholerae. In the same journal from 1893, the term "vibrion" is said to be dated, which highlights the brevity of the time period in which the word was used.

The term "vibrion" was out of use by the late 1920s and does not appear on its own in subsequent biological literature. This is largely due to the more extensive development of bacterial taxonomy towards the turn of the 19th century, which gave bacteriologists a more specific way to classify microorganisms. The term "vibrion" was adapted into the name of the Vibrio prokaryotic genus.
