= Vibrio mimicus =

Scientific classification
- Domain: Bacteria
- Kingdom: Pseudomonadati
- Phylum: Pseudomonadota
- Class: Gammaproteobacteria
- Order: Vibrionales
- Family: Vibrionaceae
- Genus: Vibrio
- Species: V. mimicus

Binomial name
- Vibrio mimicus Davis et al. 1982

Species of bacterium

Vibrio mimicus is a Vibrio species that mimics V. cholerae. V. mimicus has been recognized as a cause of gastroenteritis transmitted by raw oysters, fish, turtle eggs, prawns, squid, and crayfish. V. mimicus, when carrying genes that encode cholera toxin, can cause severe watery diarrhea. Consumers and physicians should be aware that improperly handled marine and aquatic animal products can be a source of V. mimicus infections. Consumers should avoid cross-contamination of cooked seafood and other foods with raw seafood and juices from raw seafood and should follow FDA recommendations for selecting seafood and preparing it safely.

== A case report ==
The Spokane Regional Health District was notified of two hospitalized patients under intensive care with severe dehydration whose stool specimens yielded Vibrio mimicus. Both had consumed crayfish, cooked but served warm, from a cooler that had not been cleaned before being used to serve the cooked crayfish. Leftovers were chilled and served the next day. Of eight persons who consumed leftover crayfish, four became ill compared with none of the 13 persons who did not consume leftover crayfish. V. mimicus was isolated from cultures of stool specimens, and genes encoding cholera toxin were identified by polymerase chain reaction (PCR) in the three ill persons who submitted specimens. Two people were hospitalized in an intensive-care unit with severe dehydration, metabolic acidosis, and acute renal failure. These patients received intravenous fluid rehydration, bicarbonate infusions, and antibiotics, and recovered fully. The other two people had mild, self-limited diarrheal illnesses. Frozen leftover crayfish samples submitted to the Food and Drug Administration for testing did not yield V. mimicus by culture, and cholera toxin genes were not detected using PCR.
