= Thiosulfate–citrate–bile salts–sucrose agar =

Culture medium used in microbiology

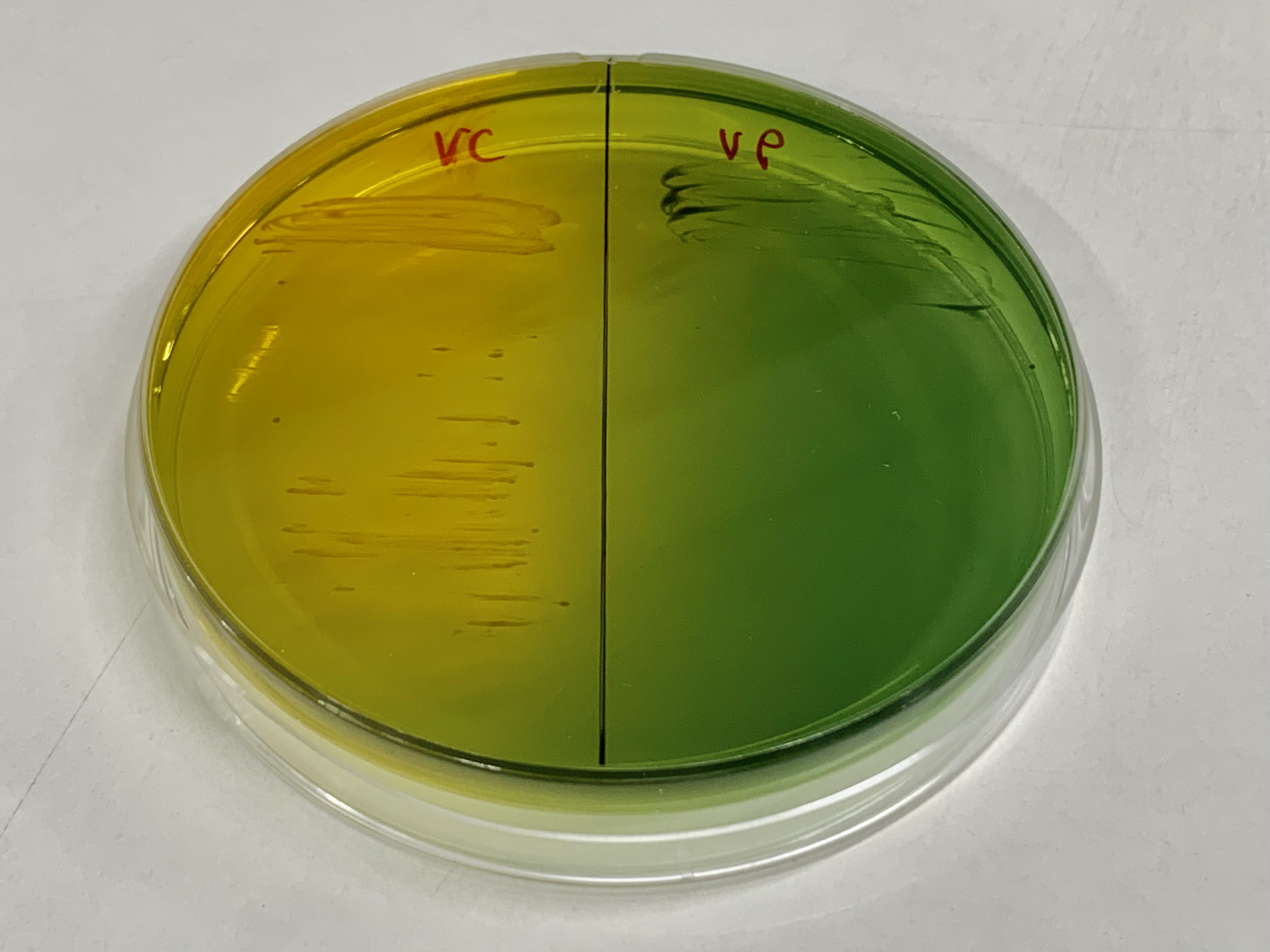
TCBS agar plate of Vibrio cholerae (left) and Vibrio parahaemolyticus (right)

Thiosulfate–citrate–bile salts–sucrose agar, or TCBS agar, is a type of selective agar culture plate that is used in microbiology laboratories to isolate Vibrio species. TCBS agar is highly selective for the isolation of V. cholerae and V. parahaemolyticus as well as other Vibrio species. Apart from TCBS agar, other rapid testing dipsticks like immunochromatographic dipsticks are also used in endemic areas such as Asia, Africa and Latin America. Though, TCBS agar study is required for confirmation. This becomes immensely important in cases of gastroenteritis caused by Campylobacter species, whose symptoms mimic those of cholera. Since no yellow bacterial growth is observed in case of Campylobacter species on TCBS agar, chances of incorrect diagnosis can be rectified. TCBS agar contains high concentrations of sodium thiosulfate and sodium citrate to inhibit the growth of Enterobacteriaceae. Inhibition of gram-positive bacteria is achieved by the incorporation of ox gall, which is a naturally occurring substance containing a mixture of bile salts and sodium cholate, a pure bile salt. Sodium thiosulfate also serves as a sulfur source and its presence, in combination with ferric citrate, allows for the easy detection of hydrogen sulfide production. Saccharose (sucrose) is included as a fermentable carbohydrate for metabolism by Vibrio species. The alkaline pH of the medium enhances the recovery of V. cholerae and inhibits the growth of others. Thymol blue and bromothymol blue are included as indicators of pH changes.

== Formula ==
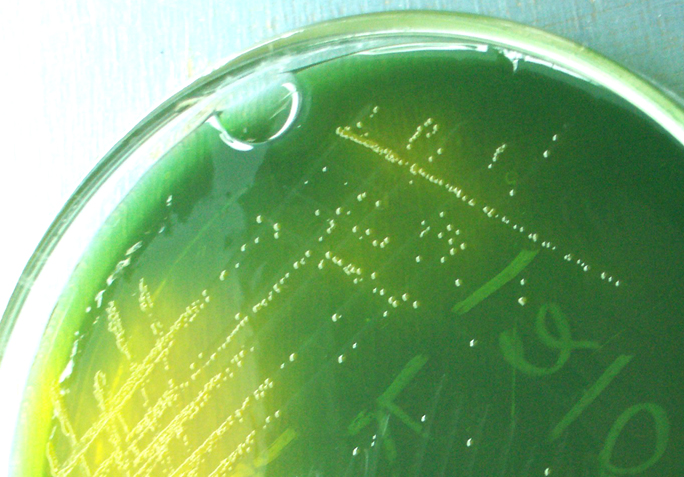
Yellow coloured (sucrose-fermenting) colonies of Vibrio cholerae on TCBS agar.

Approximate amounts per liter

- Yeast extract 5.0 g
- Proteose Peptone 10.0 g
- Sodium thiosulfate 10.0 g
- Sodium citrate 10.0 g
- Ox gall 5.0 g
- Sodium cholate 3.0 g
- Saccharose 20.0 g
- Sodium chloride 10.0 g
- Ferric citrate 1.0 g
- Bromothymol blue 0.04 g
- Thymol blue 0.04 g
- Agar 15.0 g

pH 8.6 ± 0.2 @ 25 °C

== Expected results ==
Typical colony morphology

- V. cholerae: Large yellow colonies.
- V. parahaemolyticus: Colonies with blue to green centers.
- V. alginolyticus: Large yellow mucoidal colonies.
- V. harveyi / V. fischeri: Greyish-green to bluish-green colonies which show luminescence in dark. Older colonies fail to show bioluminescence.
- Proteus / Enterococci: Partial inhibition. If growth, colonies are small and yellow to translucent.
- Pseudomonas / Aeromonas: Partial inhibition. If growth, colonies are blue.

Bacteria that are not Vibrio but produce hydrogen sulfide grow as small black colonies. This is because the hydrogen sulphide produced from thiosulphate, which acts as a source of sulphur and creates a reduced oxygen tension in which Vibrio can grow due to its facultative anaerobic nature, combines with ferric ions from ferric citrate to produce ferric sulphide, which is black.

TCBS agar is both selective and differential. It is highly selective for Vibrio species and differential due to the presence of sucrose and the dyes. Sucrose fermentation produces acid, which converts the colour of bromothymol blue or thymol blue. Two dyes rather than one make the medium produce an array of yellow, green, or blue so that differentiating among various Vibrio species is possible.

== Control of Acanthaster planci ==
TCBS agar has also been used to control outbreaks of the crown-of-thorns sea star (Acanthaster planci), which is a threat to coral reefs. Single injections lead to deaths of sea stars within 24 hours, with symptoms of "discolored and necrotic skin, ulcerations, loss of body turgor, accumulation of colourless mucus on many spines especially at their tip, and loss of spines. Blisters on the dorsal integument broke through the skin surface and resulted in large, open sores that exposed the internal organs." This was due to promotion of the growth of naturally occurring Vibrio species to high densities, with subsequent symbiont imbalance.
