= VqmR sRNA =

- Predicted secondary structure and sequence conservation of VqmR small RNA

Identifiers
- Rfam: RF02834

Other data
- Domain: Bacteria
- GO: GO:0042710, GO:0040033, GO:0003729
- SO: SO:0000370
- PDB structures: PDBe

VqmR small RNA was discovered in Vibrio cholerae, a bacterium which can cause cholera, using differential RNA sequencing (sRNA-seq) under conditions of low and high cell density which were being used to study quorum sensing (QS). QS controls virulence and biofilm formation in Vibrio cholerae; it has been shown previously that it is directed by the Qrr sRNAs. VqmR has been shown to repress the expression of multiple mRNAs including the rtx (repeats in toxin) toxin genes and the vpsT , which is required for biofilm formation. In fact, VqmR which is highly conserved in vibrionaceae, was shown to strongly inhibit biofilm formation by repressing the vpsT gene; it could be the link between biofilm formation and QS.
