= Qrr RNA =

Biological molecule

Quorum regulatory RNA
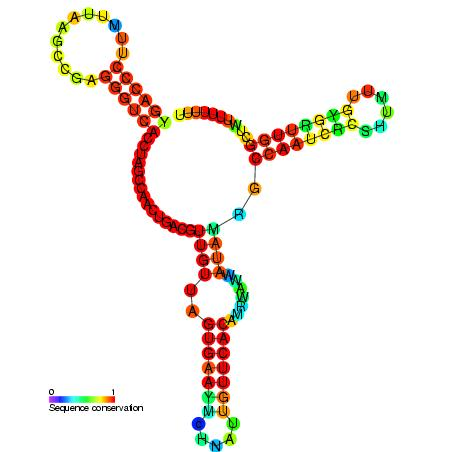

Identifiers
- Symbol: Qrr
- Alt. Symbols: Qrr1–5
- Rfam: RF00378

Other data
- RNA type: sRNA
- Domain: Vibrio
- PDB structures: PDBe

== Introduction ==
Qrr (Quorum regulatory RNA) is a small non-coding RNA that is thought to be involved in the regulation of quorum sensing in Vibrio species. The use of small RNAs for vital functions like metabolism, infection cycling, and stress response is ubiquitous among bacteria. Qrr operates as part of a negative feedback loop which regulates the shift in cell state from that of low density populations to that in high density populations. This feedback system allows for rapid responses to changes in population cell density, eliminating the production of energy-costly molecules. It is believed that these RNAs, guided by a protein, Hfq, can mediate the destabilization of the quorum-sensing master regulators LuxR/HapR/VanT mRNAs. This group of non-coding RNAs are trans-acting small RNAs (sRNAs) that bind via base pairing to the untranslated region of their mRNA targets. This binding results in degradation or stabilization, deciding their translational fate.

== Qrr RNA Characteristics ==
=== Genes, Expression, and Mechanism ===
There are 5 different qrr genes (Qrr1–5) in V. harveyi; of these, qrr2, 3 and 4 are activated by LuxR. Other Vibrio species contain varying number of these genes, with overlapping functions and promotion. Each of these Qrr RNAs are expressed at different times, fluctuating in level. Each gene is expressed individually based on growth conditions, with unique factors and regulators controlling their respective expression. For example, LuxT transcriptionally represses qrr1, but does not regulate the other qrr genes. The genes are expressed in this order from lowest to highest: Qrr5, Qrr1, Qrr3, Qrr2, Qrr4.

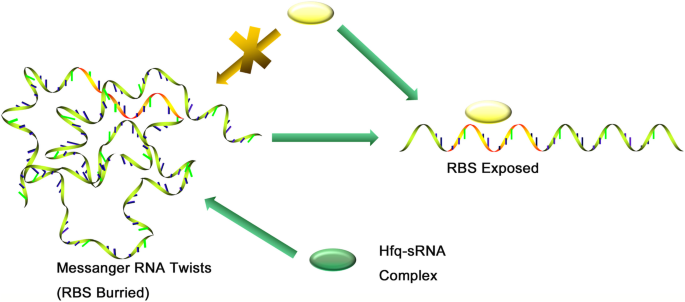
Mechanisms of Qrr RNA-Hfq complex acting on mRNA targets.

Exactly 20 mRNA targets of the RNAs have been established in Vibrio. Four regulation strategies are utilized by these molecules through unique base-pairing interactions with mRNA targets: sequestration for luxO, coupled degradation for luxM, uncovering the RBS of aphA, and catalytic degradation for luxR. Each Qrr RNA contains specific binding regions to differentiate between different mRNA targets. Translation of AphA is enhanced for low cell density conditions, whereas LuxR is inhibited for high cell density conditions. Qrr2 was found to be unique in possessing two promoters and utilized by other species in addition to Vibrio. The unique type of regulation by Qrr RNA likely produces expression patterns that protein transcription factors cannot.

The protein Hfq serves as a mediator between each qrr RNA and their respective mRNA targets. It also protects the unstable molecules from free degradation by RNase. Abundance of Hfq limits qrr RNA binding, as the separate RNAs compete for its safeguarding behavior.

=== Structure and Evolution ===
Qrr RNAs were first identified in 2004 in bioinformatic screenings of several Vibrio species. It is believed that the stem loop portion of the RNA structure was integral to its primordial functions, with other functionalities resulting from sequence mutations. The molecule is composed of four stem loops (loops seen in "Quorum regulatory RNA" image): two stem loops operate by base-pairing to the mRNA targets, the second also insulates the structure from Rnase E-mediated degradation, the third assists in stabilizing base-pairing, and the fourth is utilized as a terminator.

The qrr genes share 80% sequence similarity, with predictions of analogous secondary structures. In the event of deficiency in a single Qrr RNA, the other genes are upregulated to compensate for the loss, but can also have independent functions. Two known feedback loops account for the expression adjustment: HapR-Qrr and LuxO-Qrr feedback loops. This functional duality give plasticity to bacteria possessing these genes, allowing them to react accordingly to environmental and communal conditions.

== Applications and Examples ==
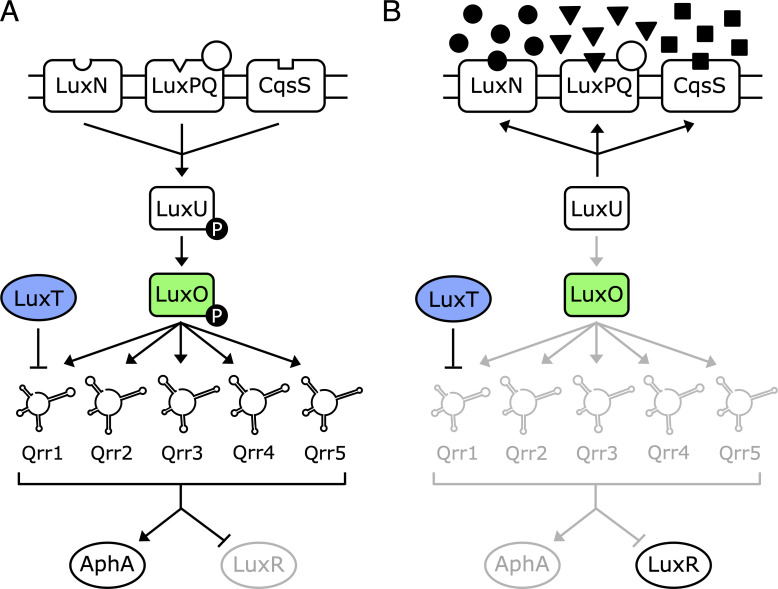
Quorum Sensing model in V. harveyi A) low cell density B) high cell density

=== Quorum Sensing for Bioluminescence in V. harveyi ===
Detailed mechanistic pathways have been uncovered for how Qrr RNA is utilized in V. harveyi for the phenomenon of bioluminescence. Three autoinducers (AIs) are produced by this species: AI-1, LuxS, and CAI-1. LuxN, LuxPq, and CqsS recognize these AIs, respectively. Few AIs are produced when cell density is low, which leads to a phosphorylated LuxO, along with sigma factor 54, activating qrr1-5 expression. Binding sites for these two regulators are upstream of each qrr. Post-transcriptionally, the Qrr RNAs promote the expression of low cell density master regulator aphA and represses expression of high cell density master regulator luxR. Their expression also inhibits expression of the luciferase operon, which allows luminescent output for V. harveyi. The opposite phenomenon occurs in high cell density, with high AI expression and subsequent reversal of aphA and luxR expression levels. The luciferase operon is expressed and luminescence occurs for cell communication. The phosphorylation of LuxO is key to this mechanism, not necessarily luxO expression.

=== Other Functions ===
Novel qrr RNAs have also been investigated recently in species outside of the Vibrio genus. One such RNA, AmiL, was identified in Pseudomonas aeruginosa. AmiL was found to be involved in virulence of P. aeruginosa, including mammalian cytotoxicity, biofilm formation, and motility. This RNA plays into a larger network of quorum sensing which has yet to be elucidated.

An additional 16 Qrr RNA targets outside of quorum sensing regulatory networks have been identified. Among these are certain quorum-sensing-controlled virulence factors and chemotaxis receptors, thought previously to only be regulated by protein transcription factors. Since the production of these factors taxes the cell, the rapid response regulation provided by Qrr RNA could be advantageous in energy-conserving repression.
