= MtlS RNA =

MtlS RNA is a small non-coding RNA found in Vibrio cholerae and related bacteria. MtlS is found in the mannitol operon, which encodes the mannitol-specific phosphotransferase system. The MtlS RNA is expressed when the bacteria are grown on carbon sources other than mannitol. MtlS is responsible for the post-transcriptional regulation of the MtlA protein. Overexpression of MtlS represses MtlA synthesis; it is proposed that this repression occurs as MtlS base pairs with the mtlA mRNA and occludes the ribosome binding site, thus inhibiting synthesis of the mannitol-specific phosphotransferase system.
