= Vibrio regulatory RNA of OmpA =

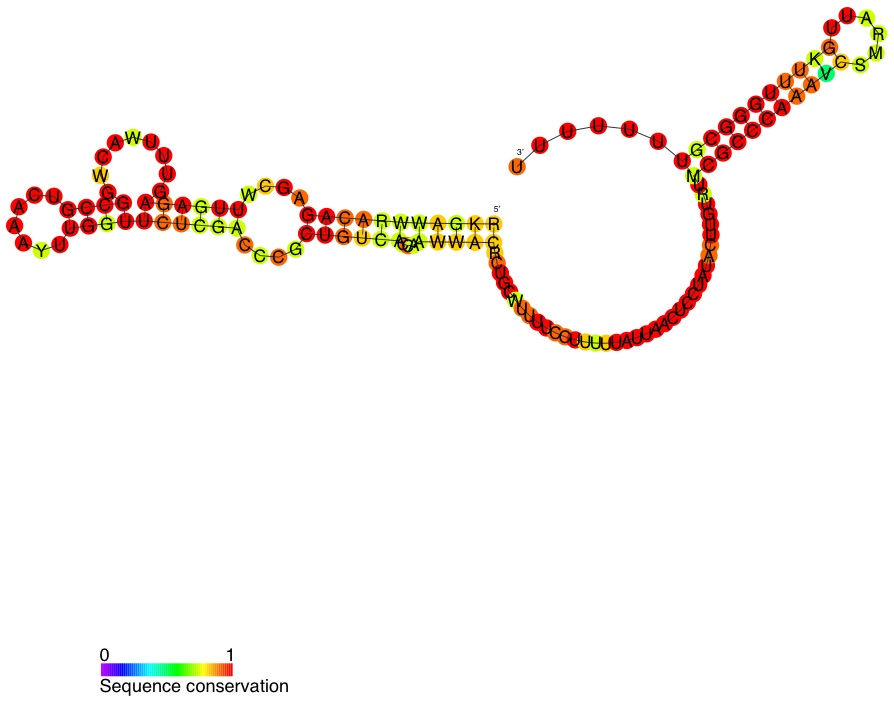
- A representation of the VrrA secondary structure including a colour scheme that indicates the degree of sequence conservation.

Identifiers
- Symbol: VrrA
- Rfam: RF00024

Other data
- RNA type: Gene Antisense RNA
- Domain: Bacteria
- PDB structures: PDBe

VrrA (Vibrio regulatory RNA of OmpA) is a non-coding RNA that is conserved across all Vibrio species of bacteria and acts as a repressor for the synthesis of the outer membrane protein OmpA. This non-coding RNA was initially identified from Tn5 transposon mutant libraries of Vibrio cholerae and its location within the bacterial genome was mapped to the intergenic region between genes VC1741 and VC1743 by RACE analysis.

Outer membrane vesicles are secreted from the surface of gram-negative bacteria, where they are thought to aid in virulence. Little is known about how these vesicles aid virulence but it has been speculated that they may contribute by secreting toxins and help in the evasion of the immune system.

Recent studies showed that VrrA expression is activated by the alternative stress sigma factor, sigma E; unlike other strains of bacteria such as E. coli and Salmonella, it does not require the Hfq protein to regulate the sigma factor. It was also shown that VrrA transcription increases on exposure to UV light and that over expression of VrrA resulted in an increase in outer membrane vesicles secreted. From these studies it has been suggested that VrrA acts to relieve outer membrane stress by limiting the synthesis of OmpA protein and that outer membrane vesicles provide the bacteria physical protect against UV light.
