= Vibrio alginolyticus =

Scientific classification
- Domain: Bacteria
- Kingdom: Pseudomonadati
- Phylum: Pseudomonadota
- Class: Gammaproteobacteria
- Order: Vibrionales
- Family: Vibrionaceae
- Genus: Vibrio
- Species: V. alginolyticus

Binomial name
- Vibrio alginolyticus (Miyamoto et al. 1961); Sakazaki 1968

Type strain
- ATCC 17749; CAIM 516; CCUG 4989 and 13445 and 16315; CIP 103336 and 75.3; DSM 2171; LMG 4409; NBRC 15630; NCCB 71013 and 77003; NCTC 12160

Synonyms
- Oceanomonas alginolytica Miyamoto et al. 1961; Beneckea alginolytica (Miyamoto et al. 1961) Baumann et al. 1971; Pseudomonas creosotensis O'Neill et al. 1961

Species of bacterium

Vibrio alginolyticus is a Gram-negative marine bacterium. It is medically important since it causes otitis and wound infection. It is also present in the bodies of animals such as pufferfish, where it is responsible for the production of the potent neurotoxin, tetrodotoxin.

Vibrio alginolyticus are commonly found in aquatic environments. Some strains of V. alginolyticus are highly salt tolerant and commonly found in marine environment. S.I. Paul et al. (2021) isolated and identified many strains of Vibrio alginolyticus from nine marine sponges of the Saint Martin's Island Area of the Bay of Bengal, Bangladesh.

V. alginolyticus was first identified as a pathogen of humans in 1973. It occasionally causes eye, ear, and wound infections. It is a highly salt-tolerant species and can grow in salt concentrations of 10%. Most clinical isolates come from superinfected wounds that become contaminated at the beach. Tetracycline is typically an effective treatment. V. alginolyticus is a rare cause of bacteremia in immunocompromised hosts.

== Biochemical characteristics of V. alginolyticus ==
Colony, morphological, physiological, and biochemical characteristics of Vibrio alginolyticus are shown in the Table below.

Test type	Test	Characteristics
Colony characters	Size	Medium
Colony characters	Type	Round
Colony characters	Color	Whitish
Colony characters	Shape	Convex
Morphological characters	Shape	Vibrio
Physiological characters	Motility	+
Physiological characters	Growth at 6.5% NaCl	+
Biochemical characters	Gram's staining	–
Biochemical characters	Oxidase	+
Biochemical characters	Catalase	+
Biochemical characters	Oxidative-Fermentative	Fermentative
Biochemical characters	Motility	+
Biochemical characters	Methyl Red	+
Biochemical characters	Voges-Proskauer	+
Biochemical characters	Indole	–
Biochemical characters	H_{2}S Production	–
Biochemical characters	Urease	–
Biochemical characters	Nitrate reductase	–
Biochemical characters	β-Galactosidase	+
Hydrolysis of	Gelatin	+
Hydrolysis of	Aesculin	–
Hydrolysis of	Casein	–
Hydrolysis of	Tween 40	+
Hydrolysis of	Tween 60	+
Hydrolysis of	Tween 80	+
Acid production from	Glycerol	+
Acid production from	Galactose	–
Acid production from	D-Glucose	+
Acid production from	D-Fructose	+
Acid production from	D-Mannose	+
Acid production from	Mannitol	+
Acid production from	N-Acetylglucosamine	+
Acid production from	Amygdalin	+
Acid production from	Maltose	+
Acid production from	D-Melibiose	–
Acid production from	D-Trehalose	+
Acid production from	Glycogen	+
Acid production from	D-Turanose	+

Note: + = Positive, – =Negative
