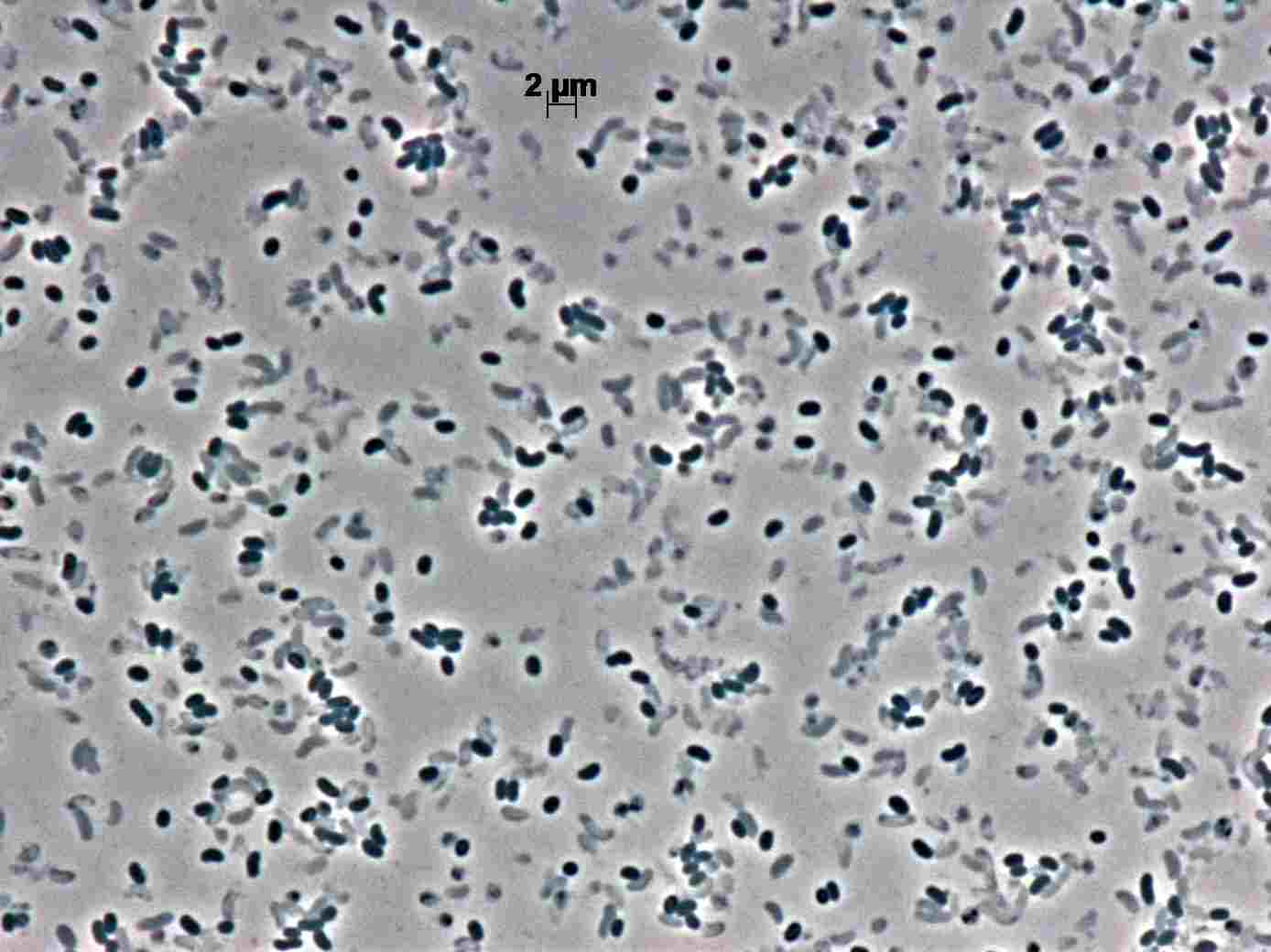

Scientific classification
- Domain: Bacteria
- Kingdom: Pseudomonadati
- Phylum: Pseudomonadota
- Class: Gammaproteobacteria
- Order: Vibrionales
- Family: Vibrionaceae
- Genus: Vibrio
- Species: V. anguillarum

Binomial name
- Vibrio anguillarum Bergman 1909 (Approved Lists 1980)

= Vibrio anguillarum =

Species of bacterium

Vibrio anguillarum is a species of Gram-negative bacteria with a curved-rod shape and one polar flagellum. It is damaging to the economy of aquaculture sector and fishing industries.

== See also ==
- Vibrio fischerii
- Vibrio harveyi
- Vibrio ordalii
- Vibrio tubiashii
- Vibrio vulnificus
- Serotype
- Virulence
