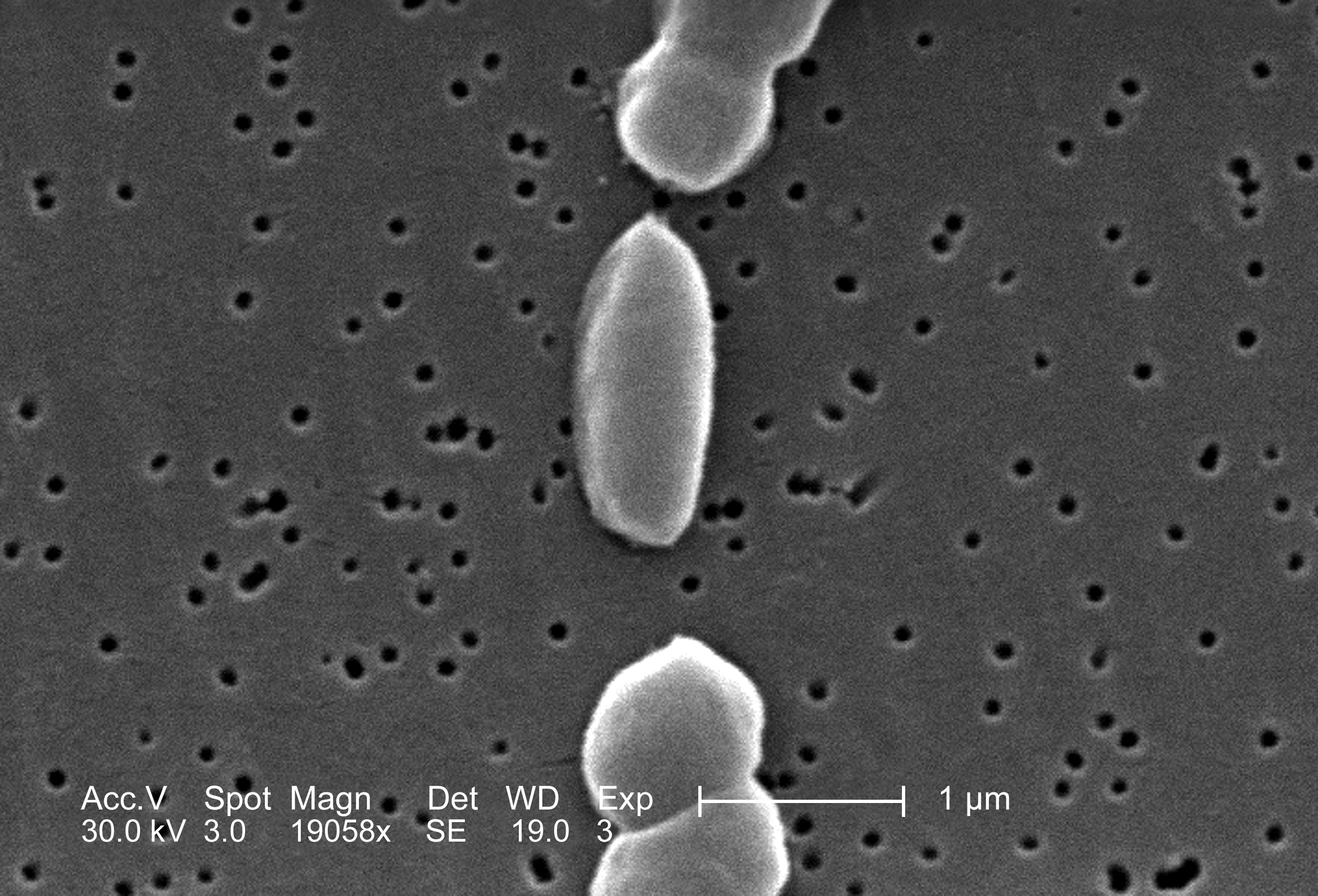
- SEM image of V. parahaemolyticus

Scientific classification
- Domain: Bacteria
- Kingdom: Pseudomonadati
- Phylum: Pseudomonadota
- Class: Gammaproteobacteria
- Order: Vibrionales
- Family: Vibrionaceae
- Genus: Vibrio
- Species: V. parahaemolyticus

Binomial name
- Vibrio parahaemolyticus (Fujino(ja) et al. 1951); Sakazaki et al. 1963

= Vibrio parahaemolyticus =

Species of bacterium

Vibrio parahaemolyticus (V. parahaemolyticus) is a curved, rod-shaped, Gram-negative bacterial species found in the sea and in estuaries which, when ingested, may cause gastrointestinal illness in humans. V. parahaemolyticus is oxidase positive, facultatively aerobic, and does not form spores. Like other members of the genus Vibrio, this species is motile, with a single, polar flagellum.

== Pathogenesis ==
While infection can occur by the fecal-oral route, ingestion of bacteria in raw or undercooked seafood, usually oysters, is the predominant cause of the acute gastroenteritis caused by V. parahaemolyticus. Wound infections also occur, but are less common than seafood-borne disease. The disease mechanism of V. parahaemolyticus infections has not been fully elucidated.

Clinical isolates usually possess a pathogenicity island (PAI) on the second chromosome. The PAI can be acquired by horizontal gene transfer and contains genes for several virulence factors. Two fully sequenced variants exist of the V. parahaemolyticus PAI with distinctly different lineages. Each PAI variant contains a genetically distinct Type III Secretion System (T3SS), which is capable of injecting virulence proteins into host cells to disrupt host cell functions or cause cell death by apoptosis. The two known T3SS variants on V. parahaemolyticus chromosome 2 are known as T3SS2α and T3SS2β. These variants correspond to the two known PAI variants. Aside from the T3SS, two genes encoding well-characterized virulence proteins are typically found on the PAI, the thermostable direct hemolysin gene (tdh) and/or the tdh-related hemolysin gene (trh). Strains possessing one or both of these hemolysins exhibit beta-hemolysis on specialised blood agar plates called Wagatsuma agar, while the phenomenon being called the eponymous Kanagawa phenomenon. A distinct correlation seems to exist between presence of tdh, trh, and the two known T3SS variants: observations have shown T3SS2α correlating with tdh+/trh- strains, while T3SS2β correlates with tdh-/trh+ strains.

GefA, a GGEEF domain containing diguanylate cyclase, has recently been characterized from the V. parahaemolyticus genome. GefA plays a significant role in pathogenesis. By inhibiting swarming motility and promoting biofilm formation, it helps the bacteria to colonize within a host. Additionally, GefA influences the expression of virulence factors like the T3SS1, which directly contributes to the injection of the effector molecules into the host cell.

== Signs and symptoms ==
The incubation period of about 24 hours is followed by intense watery or bloody diarrhea accompanied by nausea, vomiting, abdominal cramps, and sometimes a fever. Symptoms typically resolve within 72 hours, but can persist for up to 10 days in immunocompromised individuals. As the vast majority of cases of V. parahaemolyticus food poisoning are self-limiting, doxycycline is not typically necessary. In severe cases, ORS is indicated.

== Epidemiology ==
Outbreaks tend to be concentrated along coastal regions during the summer and early fall when higher water temperatures favor higher levels of bacteria. Seafood most often implicated includes squid, mackerel, tuna, sardines, crab, conch, shrimp, and bivalves, such as oysters and clams. In the Northeast United States, there is an increasing incidence of illness due to oysters contaminated with V. parahaemolyticus, which is associated with warmer waters from the Gulf of Mexico moving northward.

Additionally, swimming or working in affected areas can lead to infections of the eyes, ears, or open cuts and wounds. Following Hurricane Katrina, surveillance identified 18 wounds among residents and evacuees from Mississippi and Louisiana that were infected with Vibrio species, three of which were caused by V. parahaemolyticus. Two of the V. parahaemolyticus cases led to death.

== Hosts ==
Hosts of V. parahaemolyticus include:

- Clithon retropictus
- Litopenaeus shrimp (suspected; possibly causes necrotising hepatopancreatitis)
- Nerita albicilla
- Magallana gigas
