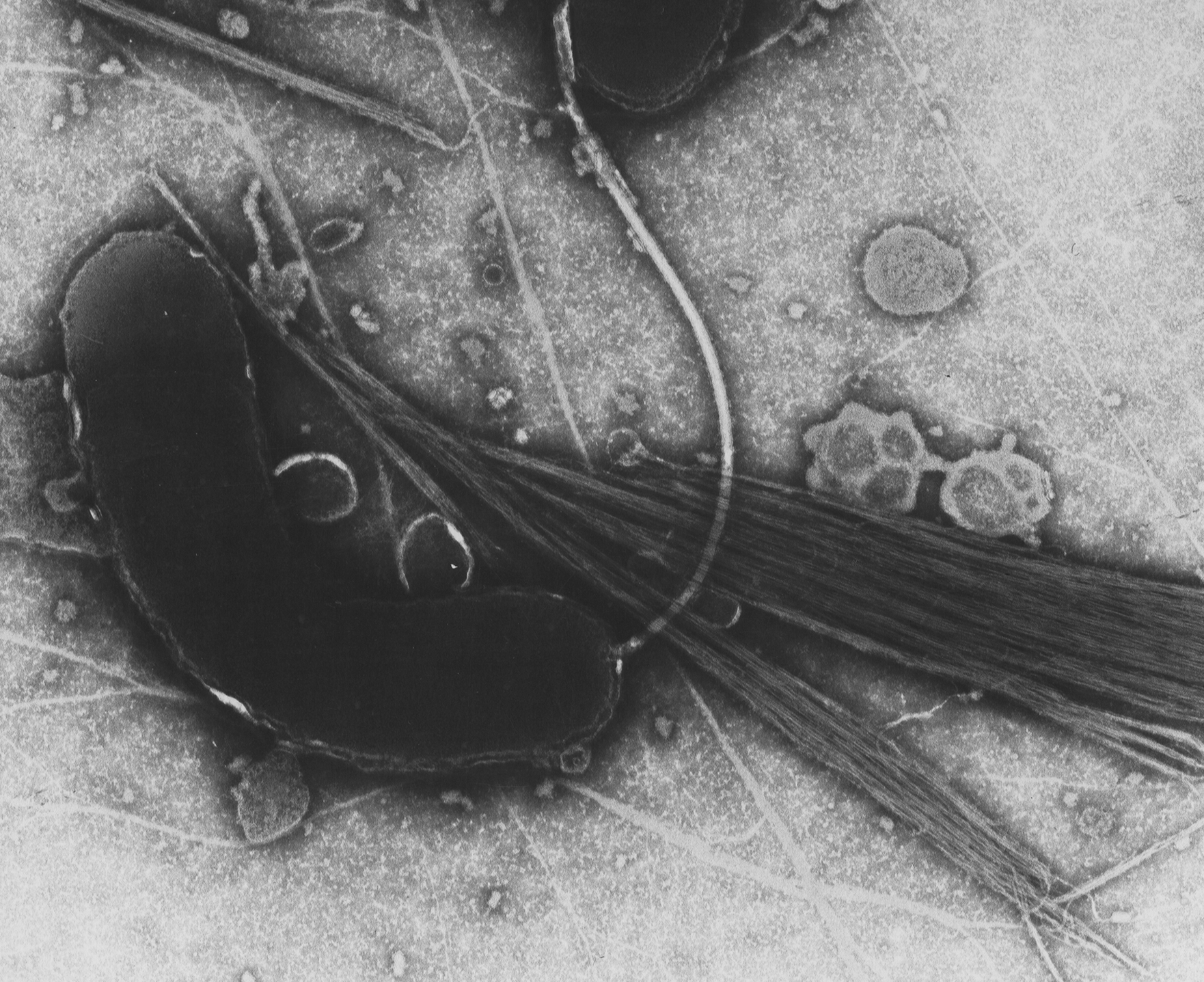
- Vibrio cholerae

Scientific classification
- Domain: Bacteria
- Kingdom: Pseudomonadati
- Phylum: Pseudomonadota
- Class: Gammaproteobacteria
- Order: Vibrionales; Garrity and Holt 2001
- Family: Vibrionaceae; Véron 1965 (Approved Lists 1980)

Genera
- Aliivibrio Urbanczyk et al. 2007; Catenococcus Sorokin 1994; "Corallibacterium" Hettiarachchi et al. 2018; Echinimonas Nedashkovskaya et al. 2013; Enterovibrio Thompson et al. 2002; Grimontia Thompson et al. 2003; Listonella MacDonell and Colwell 1986; Neiella Du et al. 2013; Paraphotobacterium Huang et al. 2016; Parasalinivibrio Er et al. 2025; Photobacterium Beijerinck 1889 (Approved Lists 1980); "Candidatus Photodesmus" Hendry and Dunlap 2011; Salinivibrio Mellado et al. 1996; Thaumasiovibrio Amin et al. 2018; Veronia Gomez-Gil et al. 2022; Vibrio Pacini 1854 (Approved Lists 1980)

= Vibrionaceae =

Family of bacteria

The Vibrionaceae are a family of Pseudomonadota given their own order, Vibrionales. Inhabitants of fresh or salt water, several species are pathogenic, including the type species Vibrio cholerae, which is the agent responsible for cholera. Most bioluminescent bacteria belong to this family, and are typically found as symbionts of deep-sea animals.

Vibrionaceae are Gram-negative organisms and facultative anaerobes, capable of fermentation. They produce oxidase and have one or more flagella, which are generally polar. Originally, these characteristics defined the family, which was divided into four genera. Two of these, Vibrio and Photobacterium, correspond to the modern group, although several new genera have been defined. Genetic studies have shown the other two original members—Aeromonas and Plesiomonas—belong to separate families. The family Vibrionaceae currently comprises eight validly published genera: Aliivibrio, Catenococcus, Enterovibrio, Grimontia, Listonella, Photobacterium, Salinivibrio, and Vibrio; although the status of Listonella has been questioned.

Members of this family also synthesize tetrodotoxin (TTX), an ancient marine alkaloid and powerful neurotoxin (Na+ pump inhibitor, 1 mg can kill an adult) that serves to protect members of an order of fishes, the Tetraodontiformes (tetras-four and odontos-tooth), which include the puffer fish (see fugu, raw puffer fish served in Japan). As mentioned above, Vibrionaceae bacteria are in symbiosis with many marine organisms. In the case of the puffer fish, and other marine organisms harboring TTX-producing Vibrionaceae, the symbiosis is an ancient and powerful one, providing protection against predation for the marine organisms that harbor these bacteria, while providing the bacteria a protected environment with plenty of nutrients for growth. TTX and saxitoxin provide good examples of convergent biochemical evolution: both toxins are extremely toxic at low levels, both are Na^{+} pump inhibitors and both have nearly identical binding constants on the Na^{+} pump in neurons.

== Pathology ==
A characteristic of the family is the broad host range susceptible to infection by vibrios. Pathogens of man, other than V. cholerae, include V. parahaemolyticus, a cause of gastroenteritis and V. vulnificus that can lead to acute and fatal septicaemia. Other species of Vibrionaceae are associated with disease in a wide variety of finfish, one of the most notable and commonly occurring pathogens being Vibrio anguillarum, the cause of septicaemia in farmed salmonids such as Atlantic salmon and rainbow trout. Species such as V. tubiashii cause disease in larval stages of Pacific oyster (Crassostrea gigas) while V. harveyi causes luminous vibriosis in penaeid shrimps (prawns). The extent of the host range is seen with species such as V. mediterranei and V. coralliilyticus, which can infect zooxanthellae, the plant symbionts of coral. These species of Vibrio are thought to be a cause of coral bleaching.
