= Fournier gangrene =

Fournier's gangrene
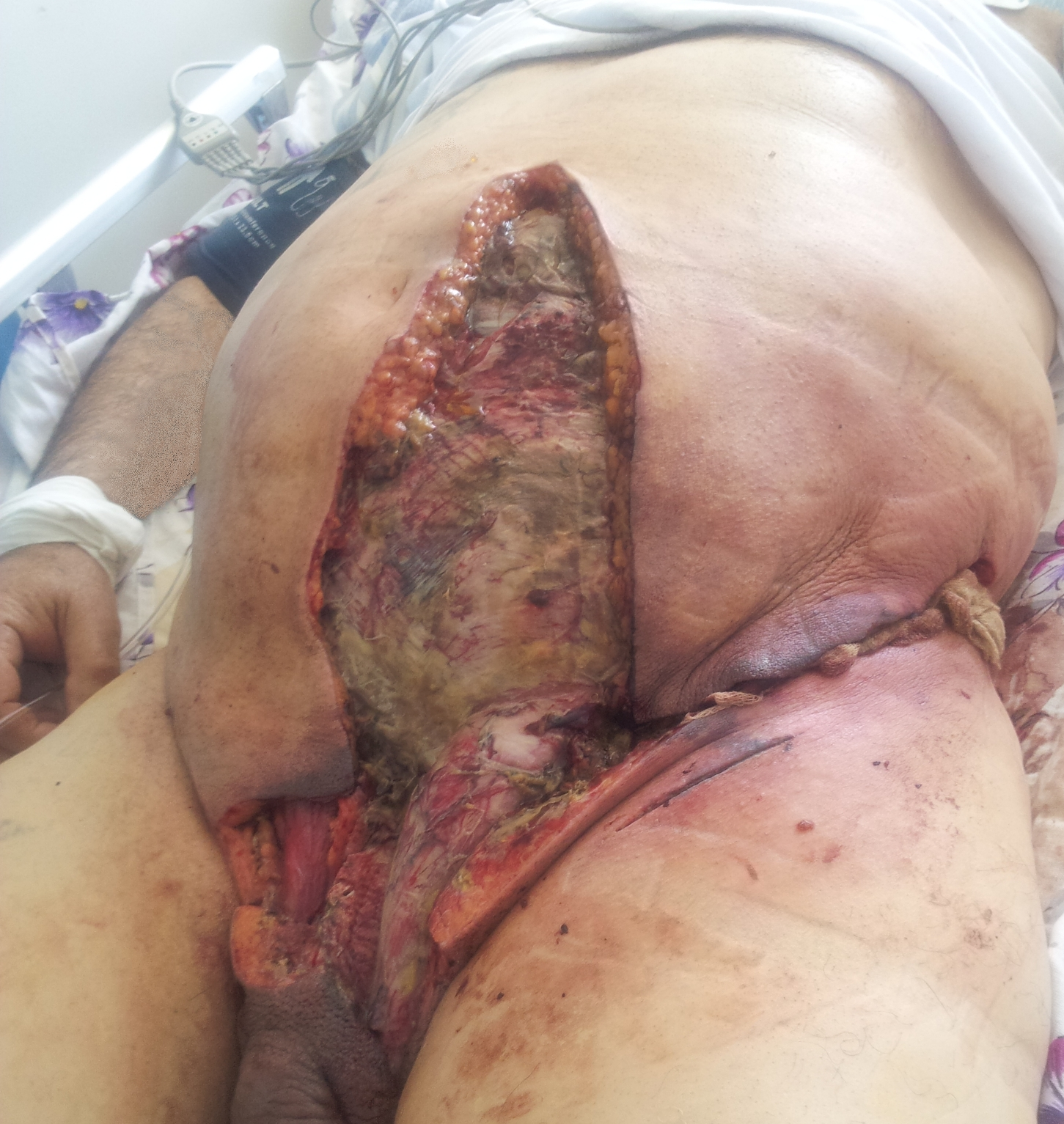
- Specialty: Infectious disease
- Frequency: 1 per 62,500 males a year

Fournier gangrene is a type of necrotizing fasciitis or gangrene affecting the external genitalia or perineum. It most commonly occurs in older men, but it can also occur both in women and children, diabetics, alcoholics, or the immunocompromised.

== Epidemiology and history ==
About one per 62,500 males are affected per year. Males are affected about 40 times more often than females. It was first described by Baurienne in 1764 and is named after a French venereologist, Jean Alfred Fournier, following five cases he presented in clinical lectures in 1883.

== Signs and symptoms ==
Initial symptoms of Fournier gangrene include swelling or sudden pain in the scrotum, fever, pallor, and generalized weakness. It is characterized by pain that extends beyond the border of the demarcated erythema. Most cases present mildly, but can progress in hours. Subcutaneous air is often one of the specific clinical signs, but is not seen in >50% of presenting clinical cases. More marked cases are characterized by a foul odor and necrotic infected tissue. Crepitus has been reported. It begins as a subcutaneous infection. However, necrotic patches soon appear in the overlying skin, which later develop into necrosis.

== Cause ==
Most cases of Fournier gangrene are infected with both aerobic and anaerobic bacteria such as Clostridium perfringens. It can also result from infections caused by group A streptococcus (GAS), as well as other pathogens such as Staphylococcus aureus and Vibrio vulnificus. Lack of access to sanitation, medical care, and psychosocial resources has been linked to increased mortality.

A 2006 Turkish study reported that blood sugar levels were elevated in 46 percent of patients diagnosed with Fourniers. Another study reported that about one third of patients were alcoholic, diabetic, and malnourished, while another ten percent had been immunosuppressed through chemotherapy, steroids, or malignancy.

Fournier gangrene is a rare side effect of SGLT2 inhibitors (canagliflozin, dapagliflozin, and empagliflozin), which increase the excretion of glucose in the urine.

== Diagnosis ==
Fournier gangrene is usually diagnosed clinically, but laboratory tests and imaging studies are used to confirm diagnosis, determine severity, and predict outcomes. X-rays and ultrasounds may show the presence of gas below the surface of the skin. A CT scan can be useful in determining the site of origin and extent of spread.

== Treatment ==
Fournier gangrene is a urological emergency requiring intravenous antibiotics and debridement (surgical removal) of dead tissue. Formation of a colostomy may be required to divert bowel motions away from the area. In addition to surgery and antibiotics, hyperbaric oxygen therapy may be useful and acts to inhibit the growth of and kill the anaerobic bacteria. Multiple wound debridement may be required in cases with extensive tissue involvement. Simple reconstructive procedures following wound debridement yield satisfactory outcomes in majority of the cases.

== Prognosis ==
While recent case series (n = 980) studies have found a mortality rate of 20–40%, a large (n = 1,641) 2009 study reported a mortality rate of 7.5%.

== Epidemiology ==
A 2009 epidemiological study found the incidence of Fournier gangrene to be 1.6 cases per 100,000 males, in the United States. Males 50 to 79 years old had the highest rate at 3.3 per 100,000. Of 1,680 cases identified in the study, 39 were women.
