= Peritoneal recesses =

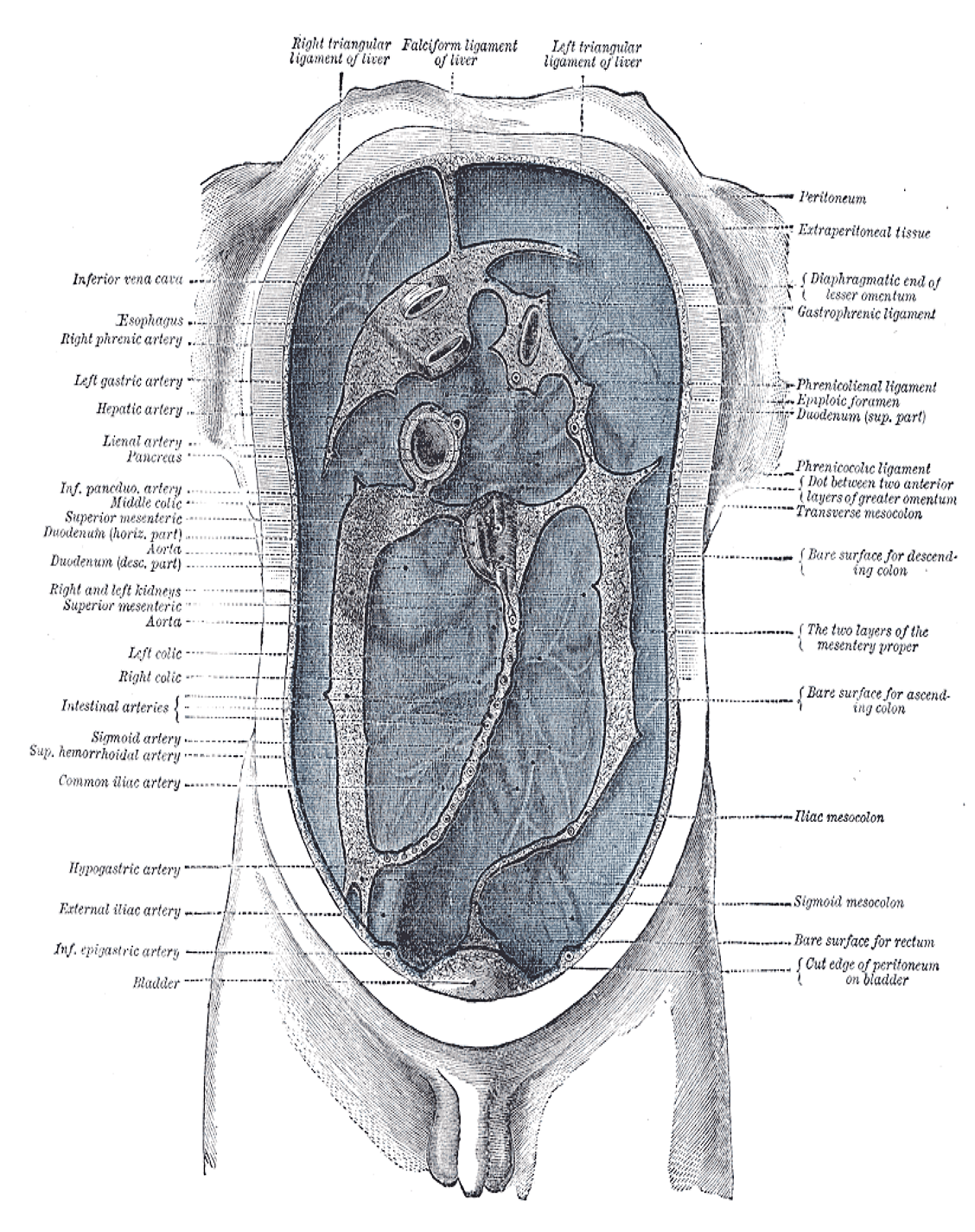
- Diagram devised by Delépine to show the lines along which the peritoneum leaves the wall of the abdomen to invest the viscera.

Peritoneal recesses (or peritoneal gutters) are the spaces formed by peritoneum draping over viscera.

The term refers mainly to four spaces in the abdominal cavity; the two paracolic gutters and the two paramesenteric gutters. There are other smaller recesses including those around the duodenojejunal flexure, cecum, and the sigmoid colon. These gutters are clinically important because they allow a passage for infectious fluids from different compartments of the abdomen. For example; fluid from an infected appendix can track up the right paracolic gutter to the hepatorenal recess.

The four peritoneal recesses are:

- The left and right paracolic gutters.
- The left and right paramesenteric gutters.

== Duodenal recesses ==
To the left side of the duodenojejunal flexure, recesses or fossae may be created by peritoneal folds.

The paraduodenal recess proper is situated posterior to the superior extremity of the inferior mesenteric vein. This paraduodenal recess is clinically and surgically important: an internal hernia protruding into the recess may obstruct the inferior mesenteric vein or cause a thrombus to form within it, and the vein may be sectioned during surgical repair of such a hernia.

A superior and an inferior duodenal recess may be created by horizontal peritoneal folds.

A retroduodenal recess may occur posterior to the duodenojejunal flexure.

The small intestine may herniate (a condition known as an "internal hernia") into these recesses, and such hernias may then strangulate.

== See also ==
- Hepatorenal recess
