= Paramesenteric gutters =

Spaces between the colon and mesentery

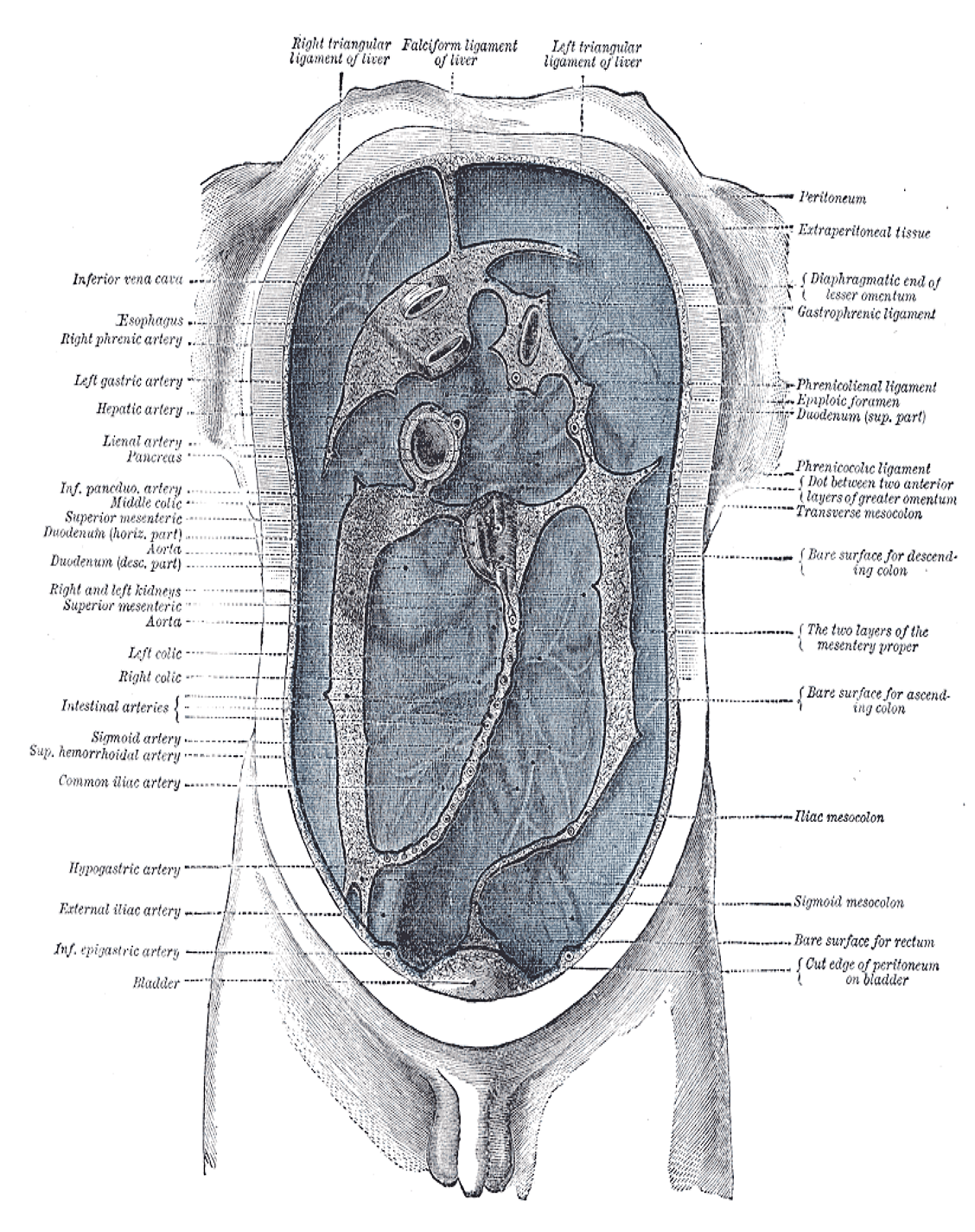
- Diagram devised by Delépine to show the lines along which the peritoneum leaves the wall of the abdomen to invest the viscera.

The paramesenteric gutters (paramesenteric recesses or infracolic spaces) are two peritoneal recesses – spaces in the abdominal cavity between the colon and the root of the mesentery. There are two paramesenteric gutters; the left paramesenteric gutter and the right paramesenteric gutter.

They are also sometimes, but incorrectly referred to as other paracolic gutters. Paracolic gutters are recesses between the abdominal wall and the colon.

These gutters are clinically important because they allow a passage for infectious fluids from different compartments of the abdomen.

== The right paramesenteric gutter ==
This space is defined by:

- The ascending colon and caecum laterally (further right).
- The transverse colon superiorly.
- The root of the mesentery medially.

== The left paramesenteric gutter ==
This space communicates with the pelvic cavity and is defined by:

- The root of the mesentery medially.
- The descending colon laterally (further left).

== See also ==
- Peritoneal recesses
- Paracolic gutters
