= Non-occlusive disease =

- Other names: Non-occlusive mesenteric ischaemia
- Specialty: General surgery, vascular surgery

Non-occlusive disease (NOD) or Non-occlusive mesenteric ischaemia (NOMI) is a life-threatening condition including all types of mesenteric ischemia without mesenteric obstruction. It mainly affects patients above 50 years of age who suffer from cardiovascular disease (myocardial infarction, congestive heart failure or aortic regurgitation), hepatic, chronic kidney disease or diabetes mellitus. It can be triggered also by a previous cardiac surgery with a consequent heart shock. It represents around 20% of cases of acute mesenteric ischaemia.

== Pathophysiology ==
Non-occlusive mesenteric ischemia occurs due to severe vasoconstriction of mesenteric vessels supplying the intestine. Acute abdominal pain is the only early acute symptom in those patients, which makes early diagnosis difficult.

== Diagnosis ==
CT angiography would be helpful in differentiating occlusive from non-occlusive causes of mesenteric ischaemia.

== Prognosis ==
Non-occlusive disease has a poor prognosis with survival rate between 40 and 50%.
