= Degenerative disease =

Type of disease

Degenerative disease is the result of a continuous process based on degenerative cell changes, affecting tissues or organs, which will increasingly deteriorate over time.

In neurodegenerative diseases, cells of the central nervous system stop working or die via neurodegeneration. An example of this is Alzheimer's disease. The other two common groups of degenerative diseases are those that affect circulatory system (e.g. coronary artery disease) and neoplastic diseases (e.g. cancers).

Many degenerative diseases exist and some are related to aging. Normal bodily wear or lifestyle choices (such as exercise or eating habits) may worsen degenerative diseases, depending on the specific condition. Sometimes the main or partial cause behind such diseases is genetic. Thus some are clearly hereditary like Huntington's disease. Other causes include viruses, poisons or chemical exposures, while sometimes, the underlying cause remains unknown.

Some degenerative diseases can be cured. In those that can not, it may be possible to alleviate the symptoms.

== Examples ==
- Alzheimer's disease (AD)
- Amyotrophic lateral sclerosis (ALS, Lou Gehrig's disease)
- Cancers
- Charcot–Marie–Tooth disease (CMT)
- Chronic traumatic encephalopathy
- Cystic fibrosis
- Some cytochrome c oxidase deficiencies (often the cause of degenerative Leigh syndrome)
- Ehlers–Danlos syndrome
- Fibrodysplasia ossificans progressiva
- Friedreich's ataxia
- Frontotemporal dementia (FTD)
- Some cardiovascular diseases (e.g. atherosclerotic ones like coronary artery disease, aortic stenosis, congenital defects etc.)
- Huntington's disease
- Infantile neuroaxonal dystrophy
- Keratoconus (KC)
- Keratoglobus
- Leukodystrophies
- Macular degeneration (AMD)
- Marfan's syndrome (MFS)
- Some mitochondrial myopathies
- Mitochondrial DNA depletion syndrome
- Mueller–Weiss syndrome
- Multiple sclerosis (MS)
- Multiple system atrophy
- Muscular dystrophies (MD)
- Neuronal ceroid lipofuscinosis
- Niemann–Pick diseases
- Osteoarthritis
- Osteoporosis
- Parkinson's disease
- Pulmonary arterial hypertension
- All prion diseases (Creutzfeldt-Jakob disease, fatal familial insomnia etc.)
- Progressive supranuclear palsy
- Retinitis pigmentosa (RP)
- Rheumatoid arthritis
- Sandhoff Disease
- Spinal muscular atrophy (SMA, motor neuron disease)
- Subacute sclerosing panencephalitis
- Substance use disorder
- Tay–Sachs disease
- Vascular dementia (might not itself be neurodegenerative, but often appears alongside other forms of degenerative dementia)

== See also ==
- Life extension
- Senescence
- Progressive disease
- List of genetic disorders
