= Alexandru Marin (physicist) =

Romanian American particle physicist (1945–2005)

Alexandru Adalbert "Alex" Marin (June 25, 1945 – November 14, 2005) was an American experimental particle physicist, a professor of physics at MIT, Boston University and Harvard University, and a researcher at CERN and JINR.

Marin was born in France and arrived in Romania at 3 months, with his father Gaston Marin, who was Jewish.

He received his Ph.D. in physics from the Central Institute for Physics in Bucharest in 1977. Before moving to the United States in 1983, he worked on high-energy physics and astrophysics experiments in Romania, the Soviet Union and CERN. He was Principal Investigator for experiments carried out at CERN and at Dubna from 1974 to 1979, and from 1974 to 1983 was Principal Investigator for the Transition Radiation Experiment on the Intercosmos 17 satellite, and the ASTRO1 and ASTRO2 experiments on the Romanian Astronaut flight.

After moving to the United States, Marin played leading roles in several large international experiments. He designed and built a laser calibration system for MACRO, a search for magnetic monopoles and other exotic hypothetical particles. He worked on the PBAR and EXAM anti-matter balloon experiments, which contributed to the design of the AMS magnetic spectrometer that was later flown on the Space Shuttle. For LIGO, the sensitive gravitational wave experiment, Marin designed and built environmental monitoring systems.

At CERN, Marin designed and built the radiation monitor for the silicon tracker of the L3 experiment on LEP. In 1991, he proposed and developed a muon system concept for the Superconducting Super Collider that was virtually identical to the one later chosen for the ATLAS experiment. Marin was a long-term member of the ATLAS Muon Collaboration and helped construct and install 81 end-cap muon chambers.

Marin was a co-author on 266 publications during his career. He died suddenly in 2005 after contracting necrotizing fasciitis, a rare and rapidly progressing infection.

== Sources ==
- Alex Marin Memorial Pictures.
- "In Memoriam – Alexandru A. Marin (1945–2005)", ATLAS eNews, December 2005 (accessed 5 November 2007).
