= Pain out of proportion =

Pain out of proportion or pain out of proportion to physical examination is a medical sign where apparent pain in the individual does not correspond to other signs. It is found in a number of conditions, including:

- Necrotizing fasciitis
- Compartment syndrome
- Mesenteric ischemia
- Mueller-Weiss disease

Also used in reference to the medical diagnosis of Malingering ICD-10 Z76.5 as in "Pain out of proportion to symptoms".
