= Necrotizing fasciitis =

Infection that results in the death of the body's soft tissue

- Other names: Flesh-eating bacteria, flesh-eating bacteria syndrome, necrotizing soft tissue infection (NSTI), fasciitis necroticans
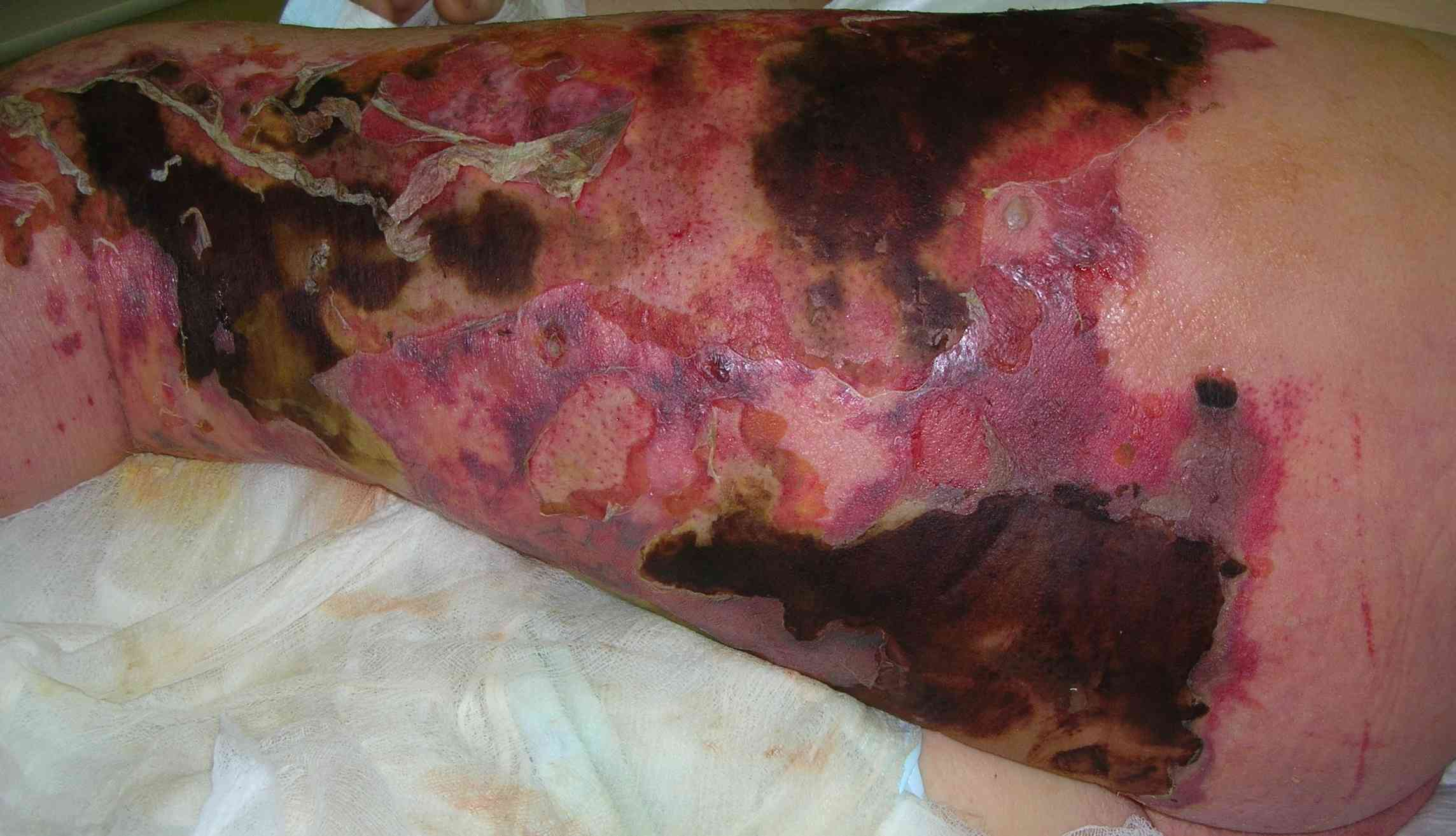
- Person with necrotizing fasciitis. The left leg shows extensive redness and tissue death.
- Pronunciation: /ˈnɛkrəˌtaɪzɪŋ ˌfæʃiˈaɪtɪs/ or /ˌfæs-/
- Specialty: Infectious disease, emergency medicine, general surgery, orthopedics
- Symptoms: Severe pain, fever, purple colored skin in the affected area
- Usual onset: Sudden, spreads rapidly
- Causes: Multiple types of bacteria, occasional fungus
- Risk factors: Poor immune function such as from diabetes or cancer, obesity, alcoholism, intravenous drug use, peripheral artery disease
- Diagnostic method: Based on symptoms, medical imaging
- Differential diagnosis: Cellulitis, pyomyositis, gas gangrene, toxic shock syndrome or toxic shock-like syndrome, pyoderma gangrenosum, deep vein thrombosis, Mucormycosis, brown recluse spider bite
- Prevention: Wound care, handwashing
- Treatment: Surgery to remove the infected tissue, intravenous antibiotics
- Prognosis: ~30% mortality with treatment, ~100% mortality without treatment
- Frequency: 0.7 per 100,000 per year

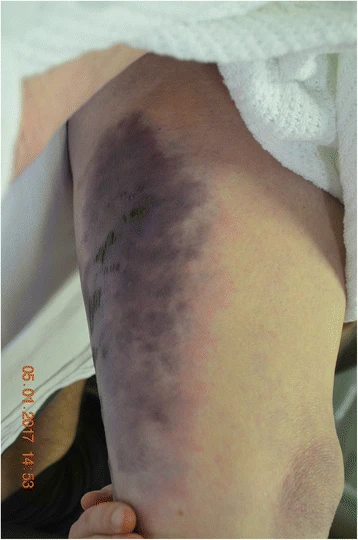
Blackish discoloration with vesicle formation on the thigh in a case of necrotizing fasciitis

Necrotizing fasciitis (NF), also known as flesh-eating disease or flesh-eating bacteria, is an infection that kills the body's soft tissue. It is a serious disease that begins and spreads quickly. It is sometimes incorrectly labeled flesh-eating virus. (Note: Despite being caused by bacteria, virus is sometimes used when describing necrotising fasciitis.) Symptoms include red or purple or black skin, swelling, severe pain, fever, and vomiting. The most commonly affected areas are the limbs and perineum.

Bacterial infection is by far the most common cause of necrotizing fasciitis. Despite being called a "flesh-eating disease", bacteria do not eat human tissue. Rather, they release toxins that cause tissue death. Typically, the infection enters the body through a break in the skin, such as a cut or burn. Risk factors include recent trauma or surgery and a weakened immune system due to diabetes or cancer, obesity, alcoholism, intravenous drug use, and peripheral artery disease. It does not usually spread between people. The disease is classified into four types, depending on the infecting organisms. Medical imaging is often helpful to confirm the diagnosis.

Necrotizing fasciitis is treated with surgery to remove the infected tissue, and antibiotics. It is considered a surgical emergency. Delays in surgery are associated with a much higher risk of death. Despite high-quality treatment, the risk of death remains 25–35%.

== Signs and symptoms ==
Signs and symptoms emerge very quickly, often within hours. Manifestations include:

- Redness and swelling
- Induration (hardening of the skin and soft tissue)
- Excessive pain
- Systemic symptoms, including high fever > 102 °F/39 °C, fatigue, muscle pains
- Large amounts of smelly pus and discharge, especially at a surgical site

The initial skin changes are similar to cellulitis or abscess, so diagnosis in early stages may be difficult. The redness and swelling usually blend into the surrounding normal tissues. The overlying skin may appear shiny and tense as well.

Later signs more suggestive of necrotizing changes (but only present in less than half of cases) are:

- Bullae (blisters)
- Crepitus (palpable gas in tissues)
- Reduced or absent sensation over the skin of the affected area
- Ecchymosis (bruising) that progresses to skin necrosis. This is because the skin changes color from red to purple and black due to clotting blood vessels

Rapid progression to shock despite antibiotic therapy is another indication of necrotizing fasciitis. However, those who are immunocompromised may not show typical symptoms. This includes but is not limited to patients with:

- Cancer or malignancy
- Corticosteroid use
- Current radiotherapy or chemotherapy
- HIV/AIDS
- History of organ or bone marrow transplant

Immunocompromised persons are twice as likely to die from necrotizing infections compared to the general population, so higher suspicion should be maintained in this group.

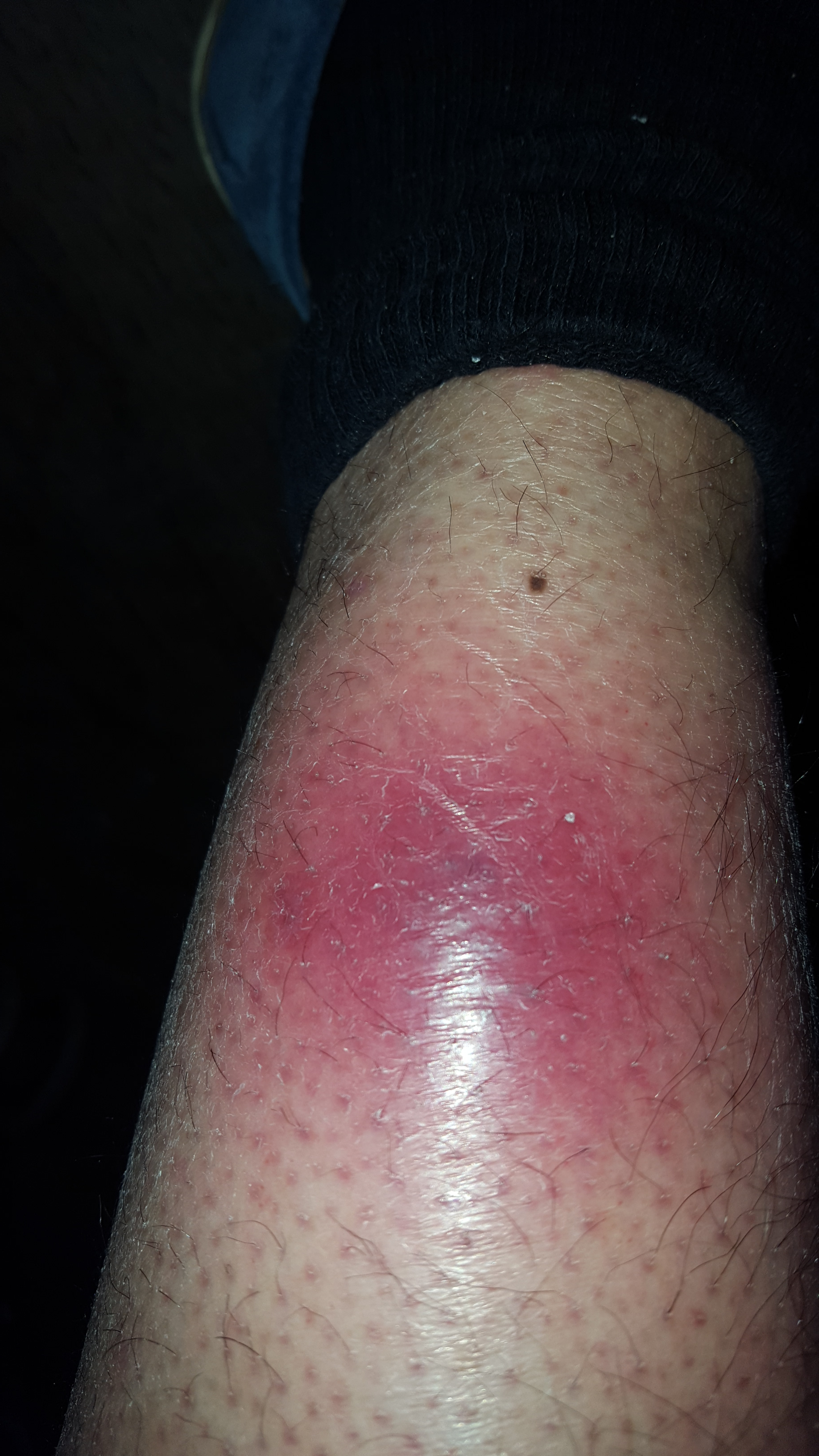
The first symptom of NF. The center is clearly getting darker red (purple).

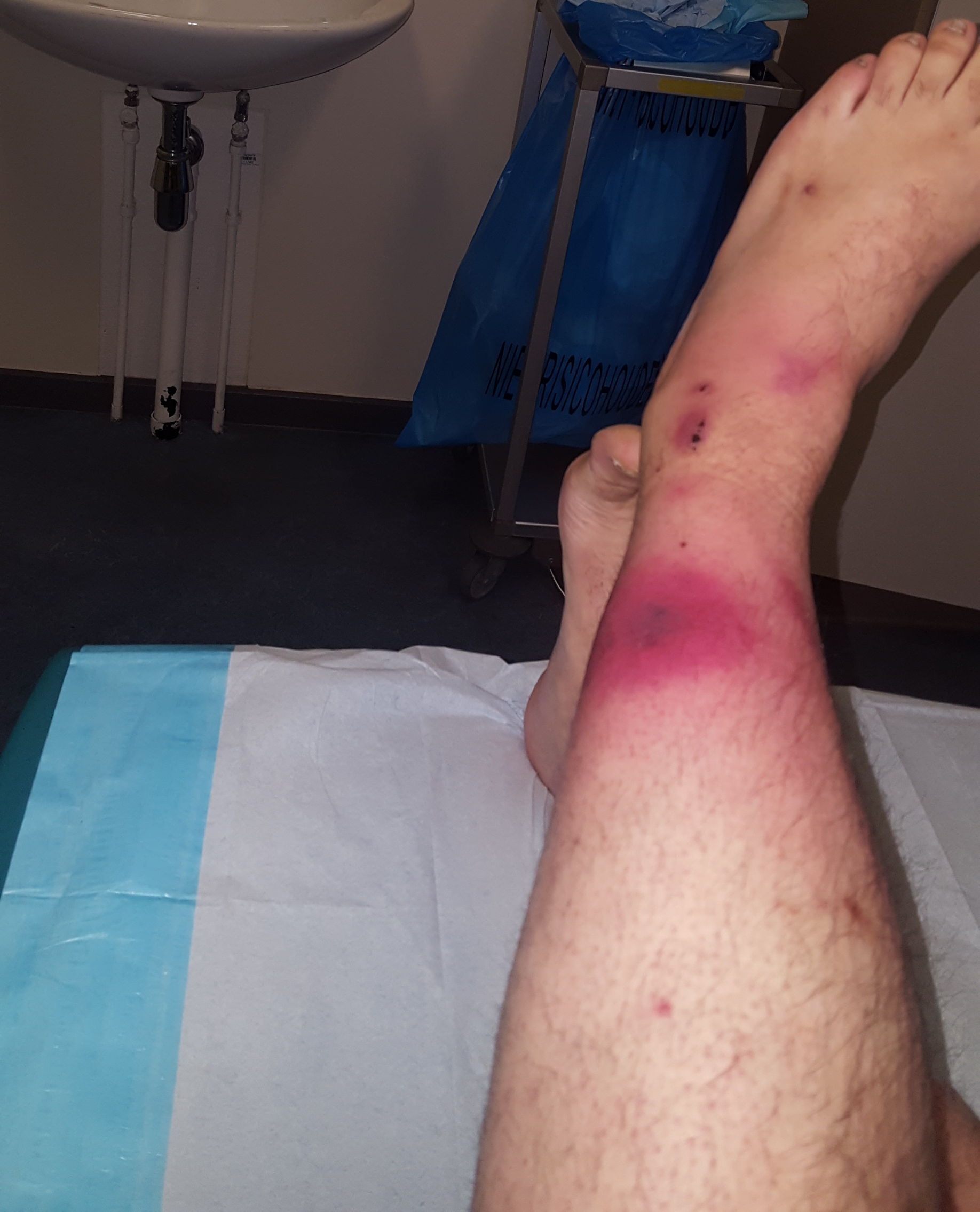
Early symptoms of necrotizing fasciitis. The darker red center is going black.

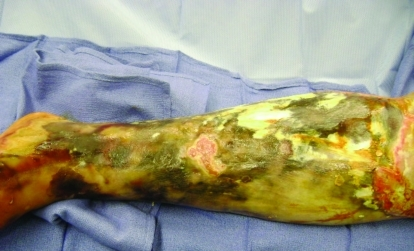
Necrotizing fasciitis type III caused by Vibrio vulnificus

== Causes ==
=== Risk factors ===
Vulnerable populations are typically older with medical comorbidities such as diabetes mellitus, obesity, and immunodeficiency. Other documented risk factors include:

- Any trauma or lacerations
- Injection drug use
- Recent surgery
- Injury of mucous membranes, including hemorrhoids, rectal fissures
- Peripheral artery disease
- Cancer
- Alcohol use disorder
- Pregnancy or recent childbirth

For unclear reasons, it can also infect healthy individuals without medical history or injury.

NSAIDs may increase the rates of necrotizing infections by impairing the body's immune response. NSAIDs inhibit the production of prostaglandins responsible for fever, inflammation, and pain. In theory, it also prevents white blood cells from migrating to infected areas, thus increasing the risk of soft-tissue infections.

Skin infections such as abscesses and ulcers can also complicate NF. A small percentage of people can also get NF when bacteria from streptococcal pharyngitis spreads through the blood. For infection of the perineum and genitals (Fournier gangrene), urinary tract infection, renal stones, and Bartholin gland abscess may also be implicated.

=== Prevention ===
Good wound care and handwashing reduce the risk of developing necrotizing fasciitis. It is unclear if people with a weakened immune system would benefit from taking antibiotics after being exposed to a necrotizing infection. Generally, such a regimen entails 250 mg of penicillin four times daily for 10 days.

=== Bacteria ===
Necrotizing fasciitis is classified into four groups based on the type of bacteria causing the infection. This classification system was first described by Giuliano and his colleagues in 1977.

Type I infection: This is the most common type of infection, and accounts for 70–80% of cases. It is caused by a mixture of bacterial types, usually in the abdominal or groin areas. These bacterial species include:

- Gram-positive cocci (Staphylococcus aureus, Streptococcus pyogenes, and Enterococci)
- Gram-negative rods (Escherichia coli, Pseudomonas aeruginosa, Klebsiella species, Bacteroides species, Prevotella species)
- Clostridium species (Clostridium perfringens, Clostridium septicum, and Clostridium sordellii)

In polymicrobial (mixed) infections, Group A Streptococcus (S. pyogenes) is the most commonly found bacterium, followed by S. aureus. However, when the infection is caused solely by S. pyogenes and/or S. aureus, it is classified as a Type II infection.

Gram-negative bacteria and anaerobes, such as Clostridia, are more often implicated in Fournier gangrene. This is a subtype of Type I infections affecting the groin and perianal areas. Clostridia account for 10% of overall Type I infections and typically cause a specific kind of necrotizing fasciitis known as gas gangrene or myonecrosis.

Type II infection: This infection accounts for 20–30% of cases, mainly involving the extremities. This involves Streptococcus pyogenes, alone or in combination with staphylococcal infections. Methicillin-resistant Staphylococcus aureus (MRSA) is involved in up to a third of Type II infections. Infection by either type of bacteria can progress rapidly and manifest as shock. Type II infection more commonly affects young, healthy adults with a history of injury.

Type III infection: Vibrio vulnificus is a bacterium found in saltwater. It occasionally causes NF after entering the body through a break in the skin. One in three patients with a V. vulnificus infection develop necrotizing fasciitis. Disease progression is similar to type II but sometimes with few visible skin changes.

Type IV infection: This type of NF accounts for less than 1% of cases. It is mostly caused by the Candida albicans fungus. Risk factors include age and immunodeficiency.

== Diagnosis ==
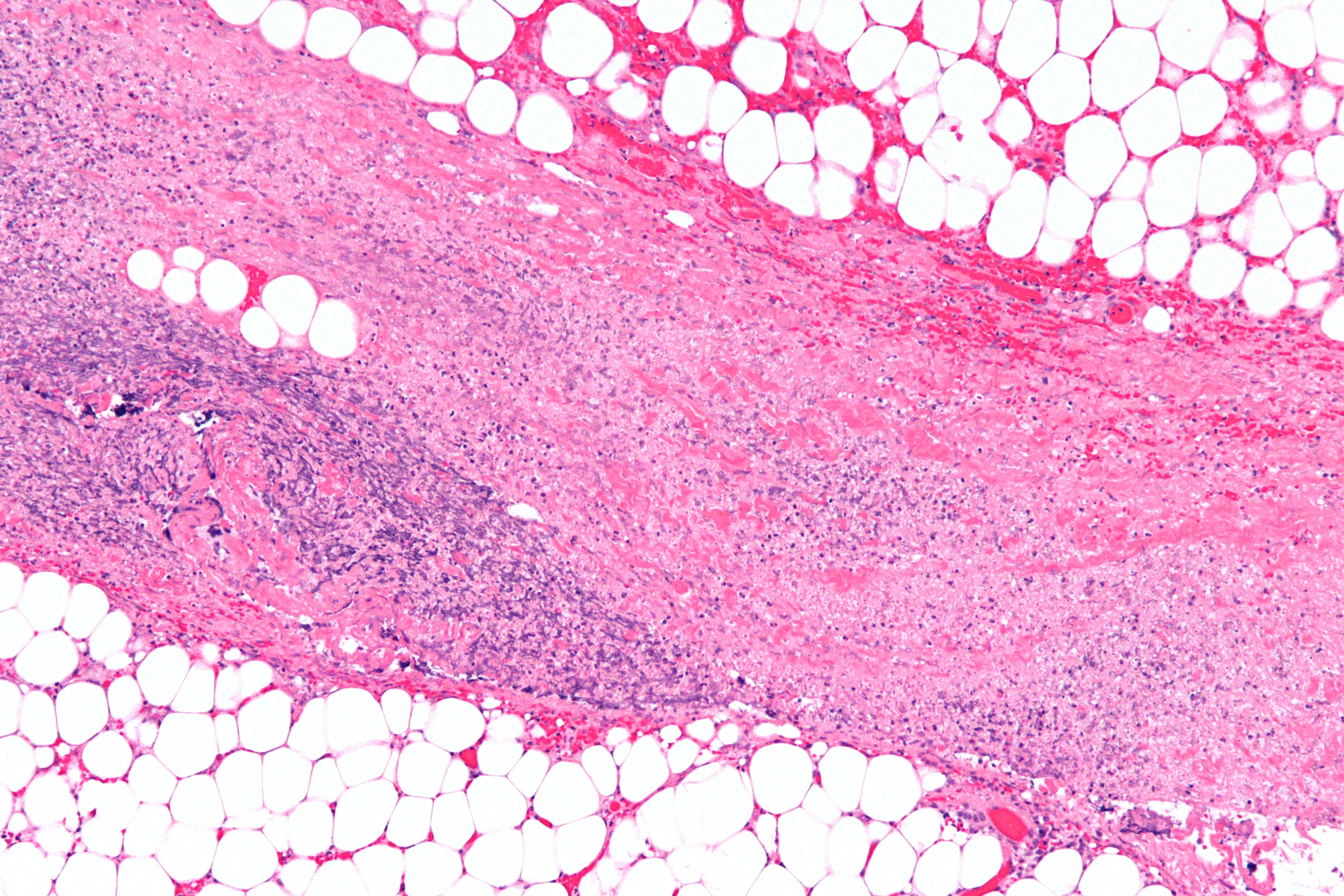
Micrograph of necrotizing fasciitis, showing necrosis (center of image) of the dense connective tissue, i.e., fascia, interposed between fat lobules (top-right and bottom-left of image), H&E stain

Early diagnosis is difficult, as the disease often first appears like a simple superficial skin infection. While several labs and imaging can raise the suspicion for necrotizing fasciitis, none can rule it out. The gold standard for diagnosis is a surgical exploration and subsequent tissue biopsy. When in doubt, a 2-cm incision can be made into the affected tissue under local anesthesia. If a finger easily separates the tissue along the fascia, then the finger test is positive. This confirms the diagnosis, and an extensive debridement should be performed.

=== Medical imaging ===
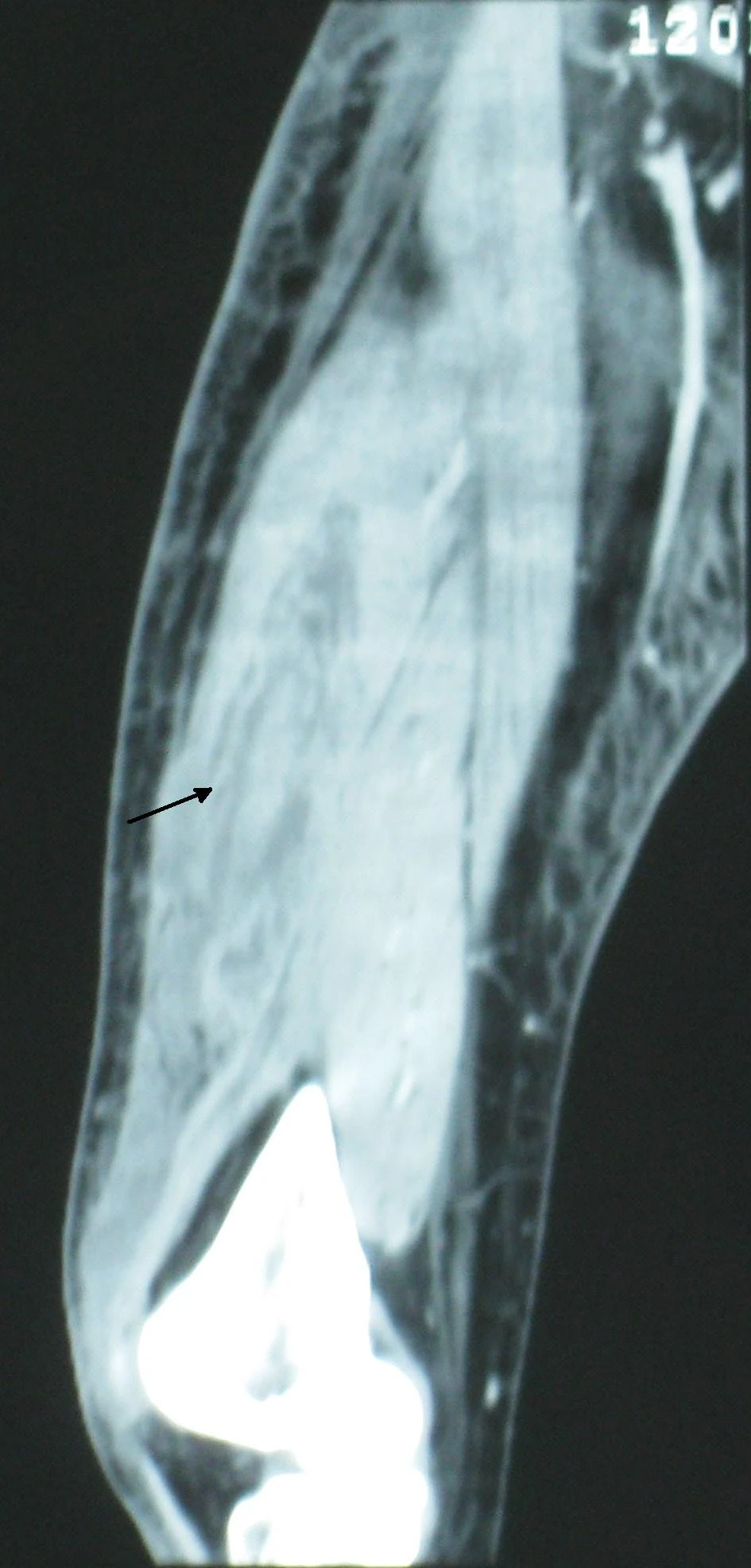
CT scan of right thigh, showing inflammatory stranding and low attenuation in vastus lateralis muscle (arrow)

Necrotizing fasciitis is ideally a clinical diagnosis based on symptoms. Due to the need for rapid surgical treatment, the time delay in performing imaging is a major concern. Hence, imaging may not be needed if signs of a necrotizing infection are clear. However, due to the vague symptoms associated with the earlier stages of this disease, imaging is often useful in clarifying or confirming the diagnosis.

Both CT and MRI scans are used to diagnose NF, but neither is sensitive enough to rule out necrotizing changes completely.

==== Computed tomography (CT) ====
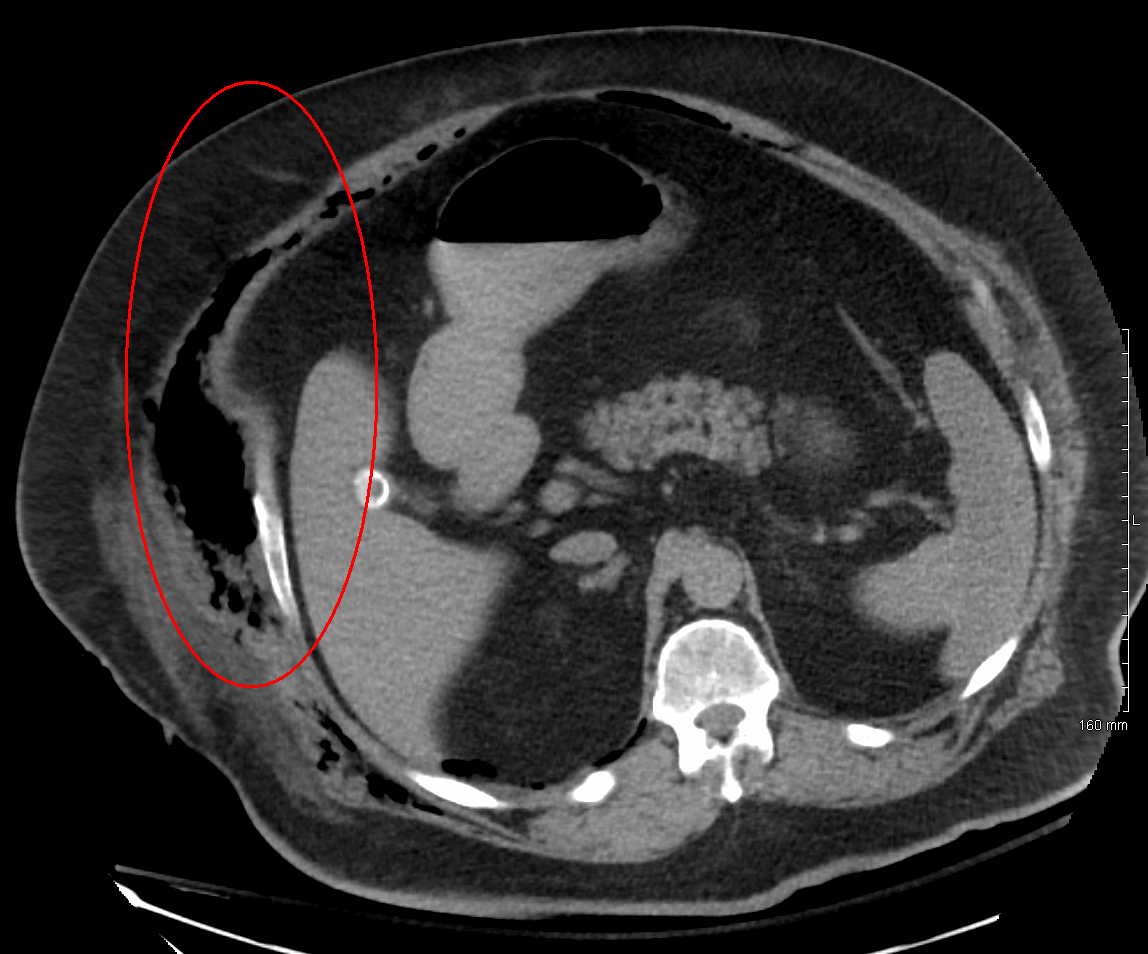
Necrotizing fasciitis producing gas in the soft tissues as seen on CT scan

If available, computed tomography (CT) is the most convenient tool in diagnosing NF due to its speed and resolution (detects about 80% of NF cases). CT scan may show fascial thickening, edema, or abscess formation. CT can pick up on gas within tissues better than MRI, but it is not unusual for NF to present without gas on imaging. In addition, CT helps evaluate complications due to NF and find possible sources of infections. Its use may be limited in pregnant patients and patients with kidney issues.

==== Magnetic resonance imaging (MRI) ====
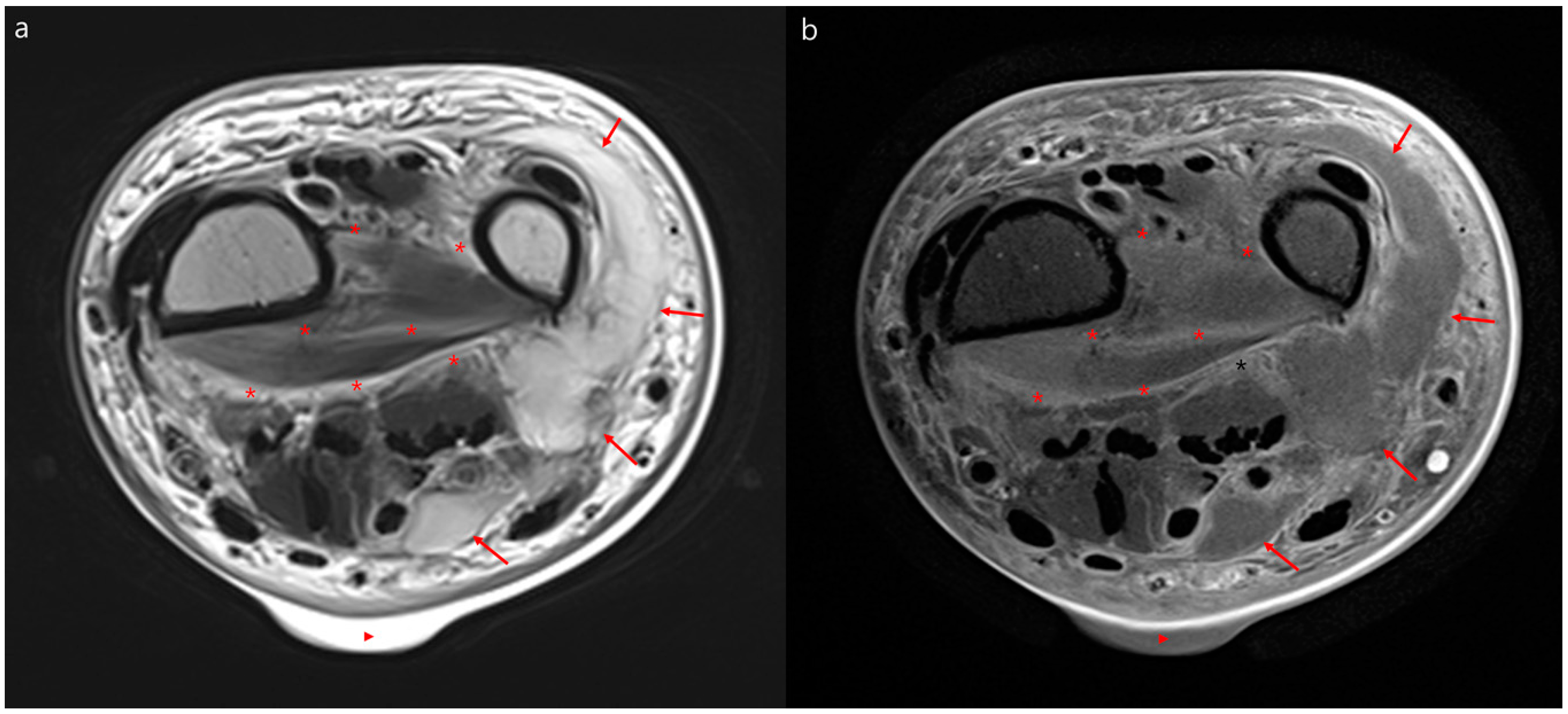
Axial T2 weighted MRI (a) and contrast-enhanced MRI (b) of left wrist showing necrotizing fasciitis. There is diffuse hyperintensity with irregular enhancement of the deep fascia (asterisks). The arrows indicate a lobulating abscess, and the triangle a skin bulla.

Magnetic resonance imaging (MRI) is considered superior to computed tomography (CT) to visualize soft tissues and can detect about 93% of NF cases. It is especially useful in finding fluid in the deep fascia, which can distinguish between NF and cellulitis. When fluid collects in the deep fascia, or thickening or enhancement with contrast, necrotizing fasciitis should be strongly suspected. However, MRI is much slower than CT and not as widely available. There may also be limitations on its use in patients with kidney problems.

==== Point-of-care ultrasonography (POCUS) ====
Necrotizing fasciitis as seen on ultrasound

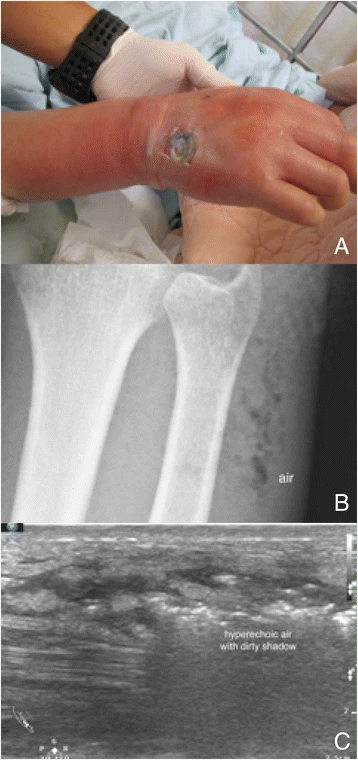
Necrotizing fasciitis with soft tissue gas seen on (b) plain radiography and (c) ultrasound

Point-of-care ultrasound (POCUS) may be useful in the diagnosis of NF when MRI and CT are unavailable. It can also help rule out diagnoses that mimic earlier stages of NF, including deep vein thrombosis (DVT), superficial abscesses, and venous stasis. Linear probes are generally preferred for the assessment, especially in the extremities.

Findings characteristic of NF include abnormal thickening, air, or fluid in the subcutaneous tissue. This can be summarized as the mnemonic "STAFF" (Subcutaneous irregularity or Thickening, Air, and Fascial Fluid). The official diagnosis of NF using ultrasound requires "the presence of BOTH diffuse subcutaneous thickening AND fascial fluid more than 2 mm." Gas in the subcutaneous tissue may show "dirty acoustic shadowing." However, similar to other imaging modalities, the absence of subcutaneous free air does not definitively rule out a diagnosis of NF, because this is a finding that often emerges later in the disease process.

Of note, the quality and accuracy of POCUS are highly user-dependent. It may also be difficult to visualize NF over larger areas, or if there are many intervening layers of fat or muscle. It is still unclear whether POCUS improves the speed of diagnosis of NF or if it reduces the time to surgical intervention as a whole.

==== Plain radiography (X-ray) ====
It is difficult to distinguish NF from cellulitis in earlier stages of the disease using plain radiography. X-rays can detect subcutaneous emphysema (gas in the subcutaneous tissue), which is strongly suggestive of necrotizing changes. However, air is often a late-stage finding, and not all necrotizing skin infections create subcutaneous emphysema. Hence, radiography is not recommended for the initial diagnosis of NF. However, it may be able to identify the source of infection, such as foreign bodies or fractures, and thus aid in subsequent treatment.

=== Scoring system ===
Correlated with clinical findings, a white blood cell count greater than 15,000 cells/mm^{3} and serum sodium level less than 135 mmol/L are predictive of necrotizing fasciitis in 90% of cases. If lab values do not meet those values, there is a 99% chance that the patient does not have NF. There are various scoring systems to determine the likelihood of getting necrotizing fasciitis. The laboratory risk indicator for necrotizing fasciitis (LRINEC) scoring system developed by Wong and their colleagues in 2004 is the most common. It evaluates people with severe cellulitis or abscesses to determine the likelihood of necrotizing fasciitis.

LRINEC uses six laboratory values: C-reactive protein, total white blood cell count, hemoglobin, sodium, creatinine, and blood glucose. A score of 6 or more indicates that there is a 50–75% probability of necrotizing fasciitis. A score of 8 or more represents over 75% likelihood of NF. Patients with a LRINEC score ≥6 may have a higher rate of both death and amputation as well. The scoring criteria are:

LRINEC Scoring System
Lab value	Criteria	Points*
CRP	≥ 15 mg/dL (150 mg/L)	+4
WBC count (×10^{3})	15 - 25/mm^{3}	+1
WBC count (×10^{3})	> 25/mm^{3}	+2
Hemoglobin	11 - 13.5 g/dL	+1
Hemoglobin	< 11 g/dL	+2
Sodium	< 135 mEq/L	+2
Creatinine	> 1.6 mg/dL (141 μmol/L)	+2
Glucose	> 180 mg/dL (10 mmol/L)	+1
*If the lab value does not meet the listed criteria, it is assigned 0 points.

However, this scoring system is yet to be validated. A LRINEC score ≥6 is only able to detect 70% of NF cases, and a LRINEC score ≥8 has shown even poorer sensitivity. Moreover, these lab values may be falsely positive if any other inflammatory conditions are present. Therefore, this scoring system should be interpreted with caution.

== Treatment ==
Necrotizing fasciitis is treated with surgical debridement (cutting away affected tissue). However, antibiotics should be started as soon as this condition is suspected. Appropriate antibiotic coverage may change based on tissue cultures. Additional support should be initiated for those with unstable vital signs and low urine output.

=== Surgery ===
Aggressive wound debridement should be performed as soon as the diagnosis is made. The affected area may need to be debrided several times, usually once every 12–36 hours. Large sections of tissue and muscle may need to be removed to prevent the infection from spreading. Amputation may be needed if the infection is too severe.

En bloc debridement (EBd) is most commonly employed in treating NSTIs. This involves cutting away the skin overlying all diseased areas at the cost of increased scar formation and potential decreased quality of life post-operatively. More recently, skin-sparing debridement (SSd) has gained traction, as it resects the underlying tissue and sources of infection while preserving skin that is not overtly necrotic. However, more studies are needed to examine whether SSd actually accelerates the healing process after surgery.

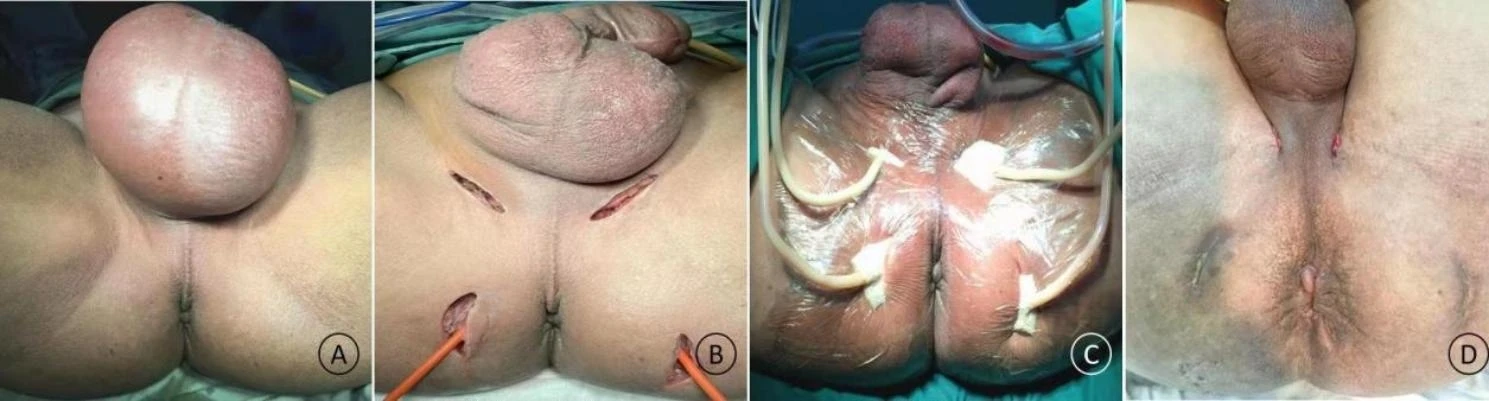
Fournier gangrene and subsequent VSD

After the wound debridement, adequate dressings should be applied to promote wound healing. Wounds are generally packed with wet-to-dry dressings and left open to heal. In certain cases, vacuum-sealing drainage (VSD) may help the wound heal, especially in Fournier gangrene.

For necrotizing infection of the perineal area (Fournier's gangrene), wound debridement and care in this area can be difficult because of the excretory products that often render the area dirty and negatively affect wound healing. Therefore, regular dressing changes with a fecal management system can help to keep the wound in the perineal area clean. Sometimes, colostomy may be necessary to divert the excretory products to keep the wound in the perineal area clean.

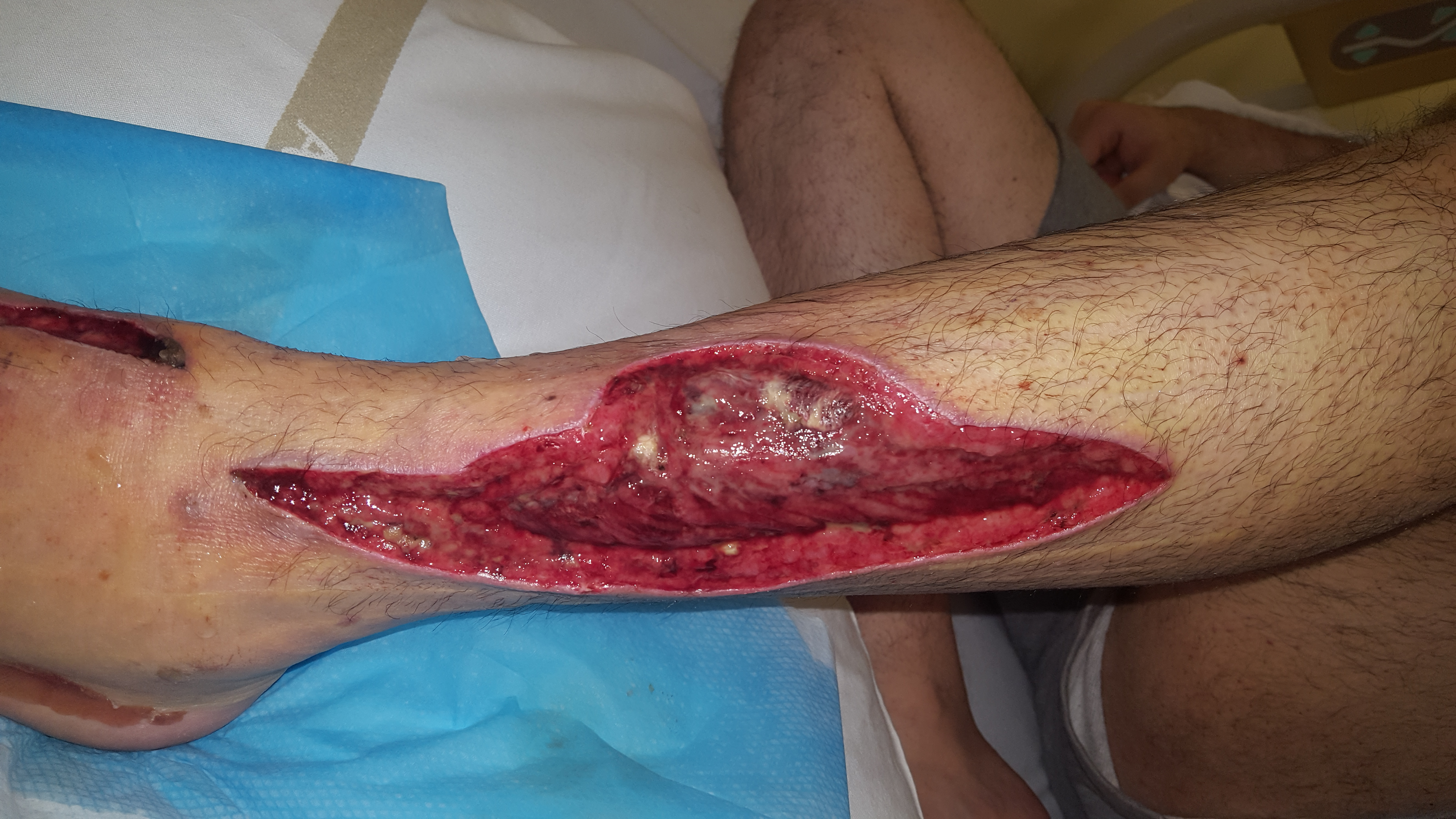
Wound after aggressive acute debridement of NF

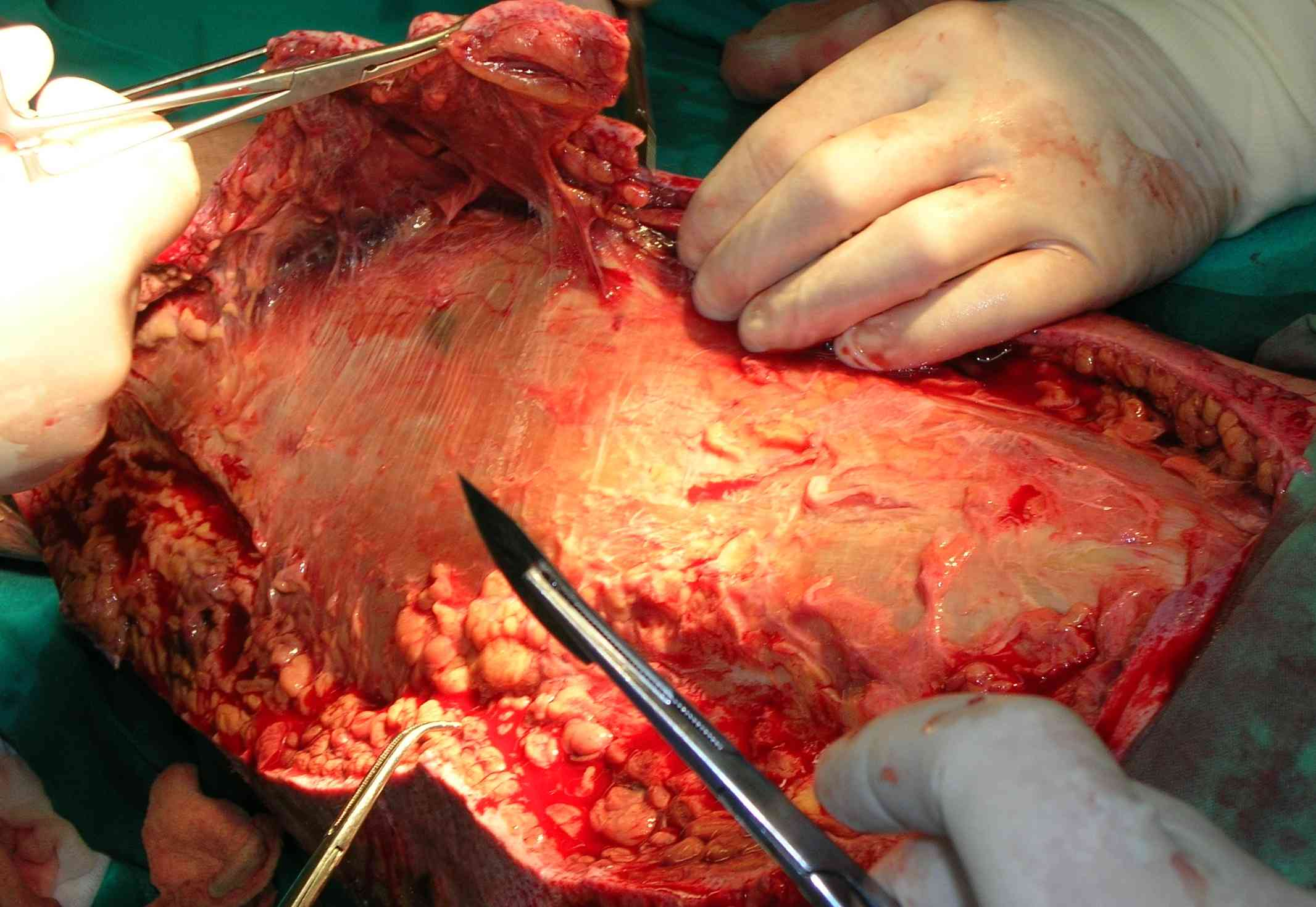
Necrotic tissue from the left leg surgically removed

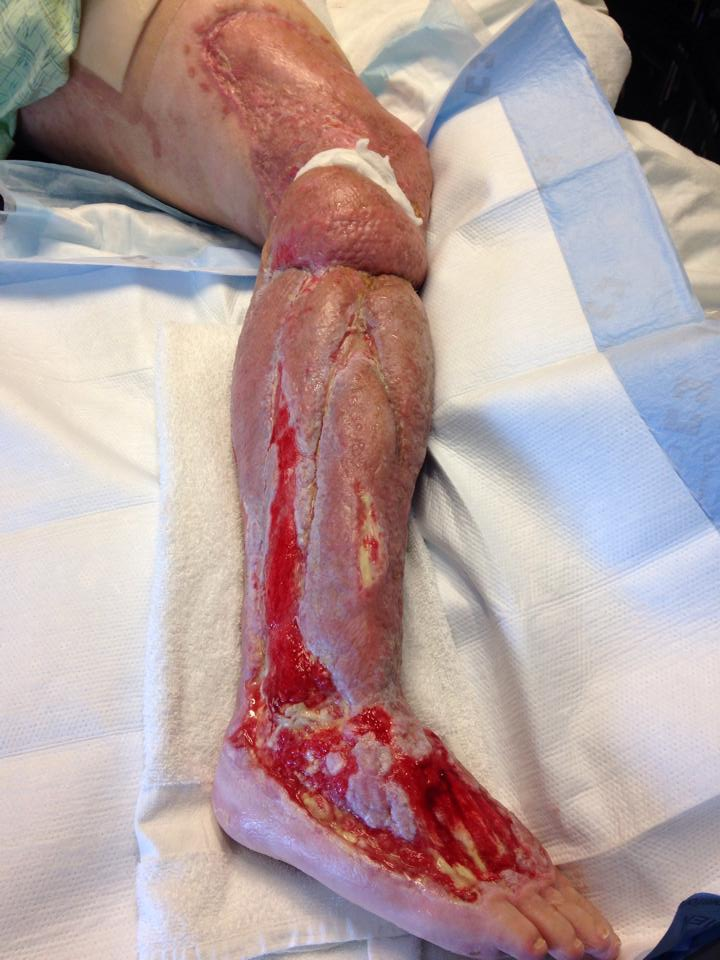
Postsurgical debridement and skin grafting

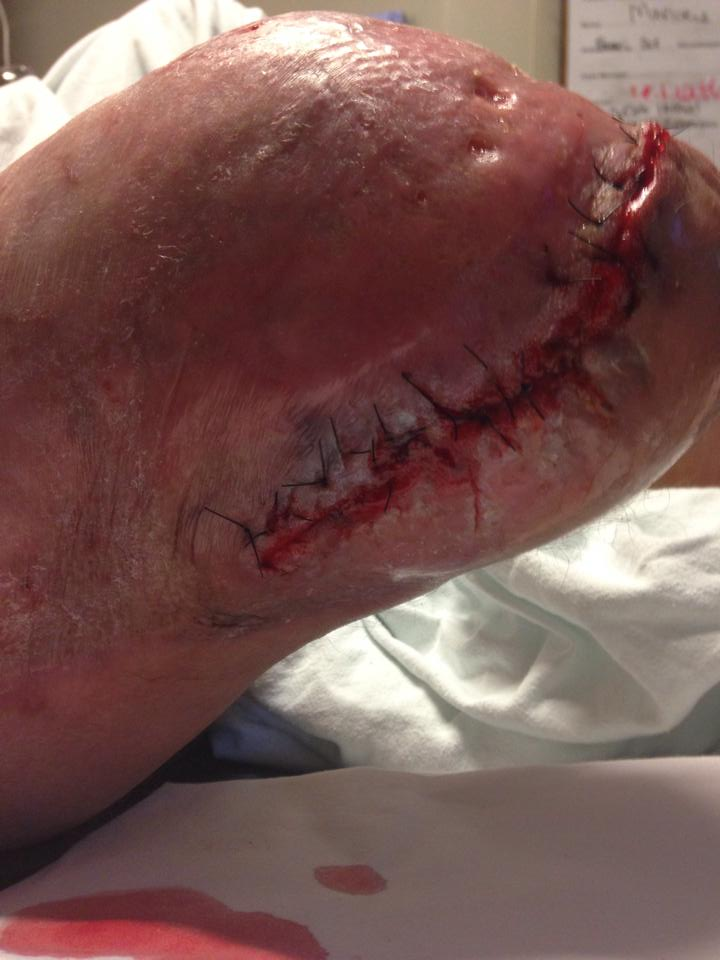
After knee disarticulation amputation

=== Antibiotics ===
Empiric antibiotics are usually initiated as soon as the diagnosis of NSTI has been made. They are then changed to culture-guided antibiotic therapy. In the case of NSTIs, empiric antibiotics are broad-spectrum, covering gram-positive (including MRSA), gram-negative, and anaerobic bacteria. Often, a combination of clindamycin, daptomycin, IV vancomycin, and gentamicin is used. Gram-negative coverage may entail the use of fluoroquinolones, piperacillin/tazobactam, or carbapenems.

Despite multiple studies, there is no consensus on how long antibiotics should be given. Generally, antibiotics are administered until surgeons decide that no further debridement is needed, and the patient no longer shows any systemic signs of infection from a clinical and laboratory standpoint. Evidence regarding the efficacy of treatment and adverse effects is also unclear.

=== Add-on therapy ===
- Hyperbaric oxygen (HBO): In theory, HBO decreases local inflammation in the wound and bolsters the body's immune response. However, the impact of HBO on patients with NSTIs remains unclear.
- Intravenous immunoglobulin (IVIG): IVIG is intended to combat the exotoxins released by S. pyogenes toxic shock syndrome (TSS). However, studies have failed to find any effect on patient mortality. There may also be serious adverse effects with IVIG use.
- AB103: Reltecimod, aka AB103, is a new drug that binds to the CD28 T-cell receptor and thus mitigates the effects of bacterial toxins. Studies show that it may decrease the severity of organ failure in NF patients. However, other studies found no difference in mortality with this therapy.
- Supportive therapy: Intravenous hydration, wound care, anticoagulants to prevent thromboembolic events, pain control, vasopressors, etc., should always be provided to patients when appropriate.

== Epidemiology ==
=== Prevalence ===
Necrotizing fasciitis occurs in about 4 people per million per year in the U.S., and about 1 per 100,000 in Western Europe. About 1,000 cases of necrotizing fasciitis occur per year in the United States, but the rates have been increasing. This could be due to increasing awareness of this condition and increased reporting, or increasing antibiotic resistance. Both sexes are affected equally. It is more common among older people and is rare in children.

=== Anatomical location ===
Necrotizing fasciitis can occur at any part of the body, but it is more commonly seen at the extremities, perineum, and genitals. A small fraction of cases arise in the head/neck, chest, and abdomen.

== History ==
In the fifth century BC, Hippocrates was the first to describe necrotizing soft tissue infections.

"Erysipelas all over the body while the cause was only a trivial accident. Bones, flesh, and sinew (cord, tendon, or nerve) would fall off from the body, and there were many deaths".

Necrotizing soft-tissue infections were first described in English by British surgeon Leonard Gillespie and British physicians Gilbert Blaine and Thomas Trotter in the 18th century. At that time, there was no standardized name for NSTIs. They were variably described as severe ulcers, gangrene, erysipelas, or cellulitis. Later, "hospital gangrene" became more commonly used. In 1871, Confederate States Army surgeon Joseph Jones reported 2,642 cases of hospital gangrene with a mortality rate of 46%.

In 1883, Dr Jean-Alfred Fournier described necrotizing infections of the perineum and scrotum, now named after him as Fournier gangrene. The term "necrotizing fasciitis" was coined by Dr. Bob Wilson in 1952. Since then, its definition has broadened to include infections of fascia and soft tissue. Despite being disfavored by the medical community, the term "galloping gangrene" was frequently used in sensationalistic news media to refer to outbreaks of necrotizing fasciitis.

It is sometimes confused for eripheral symmetrical gangrene and acute rhabdomyolysis, and all three are sometimes incorrectly referred to as "flesh-eating virus".

== Society and culture ==
=== Notable cases ===
- 1994: Lucien Bouchard, future premier of Québec, Canada, who was infected while leader of the federal official opposition Bloc Québécois party, lost a leg to the illness.
- 1994: A cluster of cases occurred in Gloucestershire, in the west of England. Of five confirmed and one probable infection, two died. The cases were believed to be connected. The first two had acquired the Streptococcus pyogenes bacteria during surgery; the remaining four were community-acquired. The cases generated much newspaper coverage, with lurid headlines such as "Flesh Eating Bug Ate My Face".
- 1997: Jeff Moorad, former agent and partial owner of the San Diego Padres and Arizona Diamondbacks, contracted the disease. He had seven surgeries in a little more than a week and later fully recovered.
- 2004: Don Rickles, American stand-up comedian, actor, and author, known especially for his insult comedy, contracted the disease in his left leg. He had six operations and later recovered. The condition confined him in his later years to performing comedy from a chair.
- 2004: Eric Allin Cornell, winner of the 2001 Nobel Prize in Physics, lost his left arm and shoulder to the disease.
- 2005: Alexandru Marin, an experimental particle physicist, professor at MIT, Boston University, and Harvard University, and researcher at CERN and JINR, died from the disease.
- 2006: Alan Coren, British writer and satirist, announced in his Christmas column for The Times that his long absence as a columnist had been caused by his contracting the disease while on holiday in France.
- 2009: R. W. Johnson, British journalist and historian, contracted the disease in March after injuring his foot while swimming. His leg was amputated above the knee.
- 2011: Jeff Hanneman, guitarist for the thrash metal band Slayer, contracted the disease. He died of liver failure two years later, on May 2, 2013, and it was speculated that his infection was the cause of death. However, on May 9, 2013, the official cause of death was announced as alcohol-related cirrhosis. Hanneman and his family had apparently been unaware of the extent of the condition until shortly before his death.
- 2011: Peter Watts, Canadian science fiction author, contracted the disease. On his blog, Watts reported, "I'm told I was a few hours away from being dead ... If there was ever a disease fit for a science-fiction writer, flesh-eating disease has got to be it. This ... spread across my leg as fast as a Star Trek space disease in time-lapse."
- 2013: British actress Georgie Henley revealed in 2022 that she had contracted the disease several weeks after starting at Cambridge University and that it had almost claimed her life.
- 2014: Daniel Gildenlöw, Swedish singer and songwriter for the band Pain of Salvation, spent several months in a hospital after being diagnosed with necrotizing fasciitis on his back in early 2014. After recovering, he wrote the album In the Passing Light of Day, a concept album about his experience during the hospitalization.
- 2014: Ricky Bartlett, SAG-AFTRA actor and S.O.V.A.S. voiceover artist, lost both legs to NF. He contracted the disease during a trip to Wyoming and South Dakota.
- 2015: Edgar Savisaar, Estonian politician, had his right leg amputated. He got the disease during a trip to Thailand.
- 2018: Alex Smith, an American football quarterback for the Washington Football Team of the National Football League (NFL), contracted the disease after being injured during a game. He suffered an open compound fracture in his lower leg, which became infected. Smith narrowly avoided amputation and eventually returned to playing professional football in October 2020. Smith's injury and recovery is the subject of the ESPN documentary E60 Presents: Project 11.
- 2019: OG Maco contracted NF after an untreated rash.
- 2021: Irish actor Barry Keoghan revealed in 2024 that he contracted NF shortly before filming The Banshees of Inisherin and nearly had his arm amputated.

== See also ==
- Capnocytophaga canimorsus
- Gangrene
- Mucormycosis, a rare fungal infection that can resemble necrotizing fasciitis (See type IV NF listing above)
- Noma (disease)
- Toxic shock syndrome
- Vibrio vulnificus
