= Paracolic gutters =

Space between colon and abdominal wall

The paracolic gutters (paracolic sulci, paracolic recesses) are peritoneal recesses – spaces between the colon and the abdominal wall.

== Structure ==
There are two paracolic gutters:

- The right lateral paracolic gutter.
- The left medial paracolic gutter.

The right and left paracolic gutters are peritoneal recesses on the posterior abdominal wall lying alongside the ascending and descending colon. The main paracolic gutter lies lateral to the colon on each side. A less obvious medial paracolic gutter may be formed, especially on the right side, if the colon possesses a short mesentery for part of its length. The right (lateral) paracolic gutter runs from the superiolateral aspect of the hepatic flexure of the colon, down the lateral aspect of the ascending colon, and around the cecum. It is continuous with the peritoneum as it descends into the pelvis over the pelvic brim. Superiorly, it is continuous with the peritoneum which lines the hepatorenal pouch and, through the epiploic foramen, the lesser sac.

=== Variation ===
The left paracolic gutter is larger than the right, which together with the partial barrier provided by the phrenicocolic ligament, may explain why left subphrenic collections are more common than right subphrenic collections.

== Function ==
These gutters are clinically important because they allow a passage for infectious fluids from different compartments of the abdomen. For example; fluid from an infected appendix can track up the right paracolic gutter to the hepatorenal recess.

== Clinical significance ==
Bile, pus, or blood released from viscera anywhere along its length may run along the paracolic gutter, and collect in sites quite remote from the organ of origin. In supine patients, infected fluid from the right iliac fossa may ascend in the paracolic gutter to enter the lesser sac. In patients nursed in a sitting position, fluid from the stomach, duodenum, or gallbladder may run down the paracolic gutter to collect in the right iliac fossa or pelvis. This may mimic acute appendicitis or form a pelvic abscess. The left paracolic gutter is larger than the right, which together with the partial barrier provided by the phrenicocolic ligament (also known as Hensing's ligament), may explain why left subphrenic collections are more common than right subphrenic collections.

== See also ==
- Peritoneal recesses
- Paramesenteric gutters
