= Mueller–Weiss syndrome =

Bone disease of the foot

- Other names: Mueller–Weiss disease, Müller–Weiss syndrome, Brailsford disease
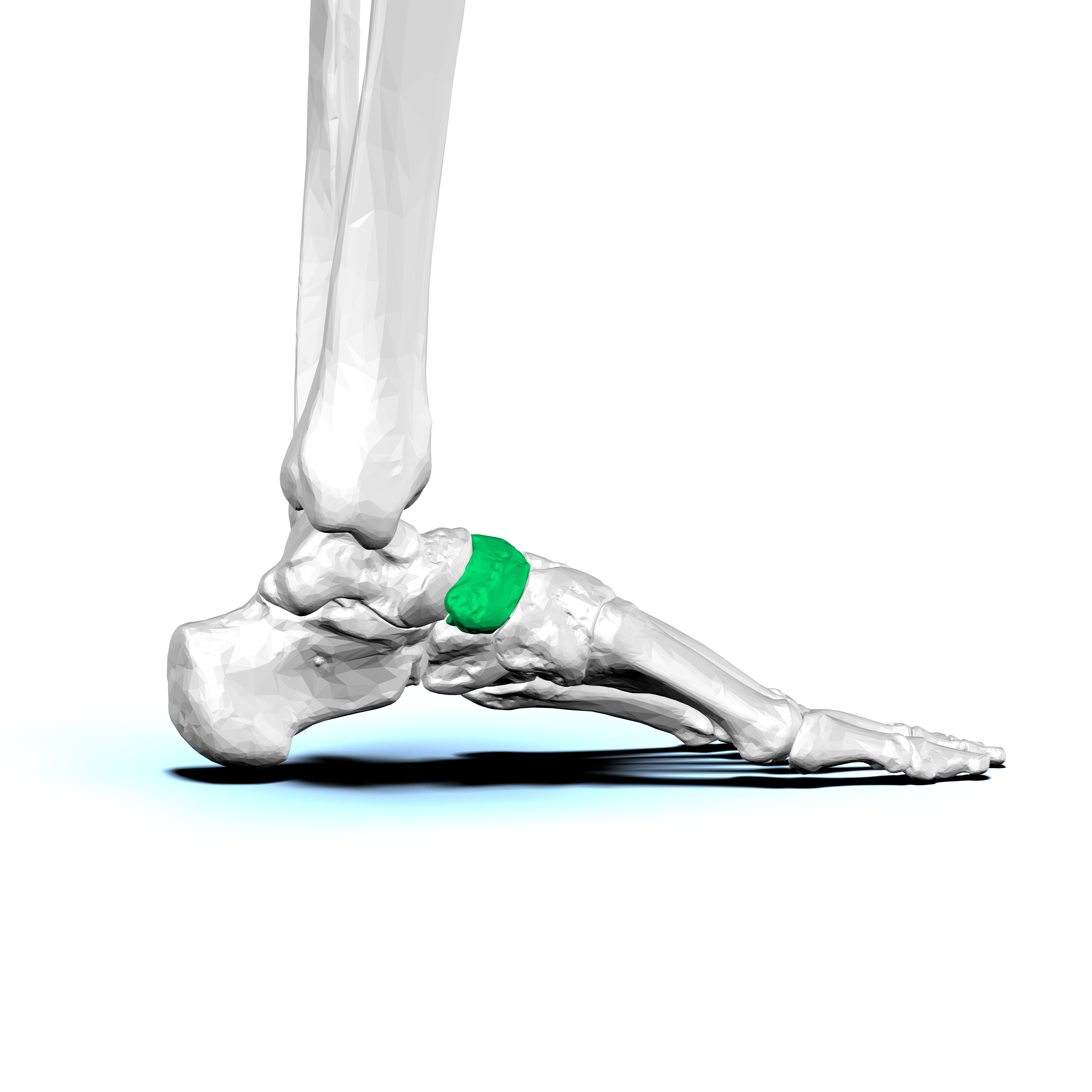
- Medial view, bones of the foot, navicular in green
- Specialty: Orthopedics
- Symptoms: Midfoot pain
- Usual onset: Sub-acute
- Treatment: Medication, surgery
- Frequency: 0.0001%

Mueller–Weiss syndrome, also known as Mueller–Weiss disease, is a rare idiopathic degenerative disease of the adult navicular bone characterized by progressive collapse and fragmentation, leading to mid- and hindfoot pain and deformity. It is most commonly seen in females, ages 40–60. Characteristic imaging shows lateral navicular collapse. This disease had been historically considered to be a form of adult onset osteonecrosis, with blood flow cutoff to the navicular.

== Presentation ==
The onset is sub-acute; subsequent foot discomfort may progress to disabling pain with prolonged standing. It is considered a pain out of proportion, where the symptoms described do not correspond to the other signs, making an early diagnosis more difficult. Pain is in mid- and hindfoot, with tenderness on the top of the midfoot. Depending on the severity there may be a hindfoot varus with a flat arch. Delay in diagnosis is particularly problematic; early diagnosis is critical. It is frequently misdiagnosed, increasing the level and length of pain and disability for affected patients. Other conditions which may mimic or have features of Mueller–Weiss include Paget's disease of bone, osteomyelitis, healing fractures, lupus, rheumatoid arthritis and Charcot arthropathy.

== Navicular ==
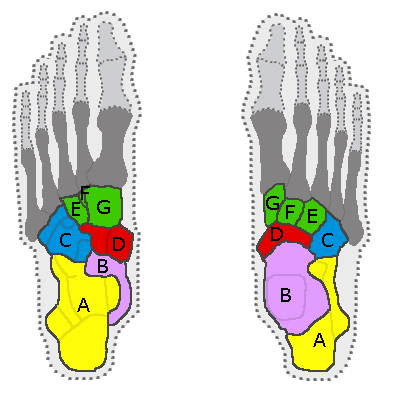
The bones of the tarsus with A=calcaneus, B=talus bone, C=cuboid bone, D=navicular bone, E=lateral cuneiform, F=intermediate cuneiform and G=medial cuneiform. In dark grey the metatarsals. Left image: seen from below. Right image: seen from above

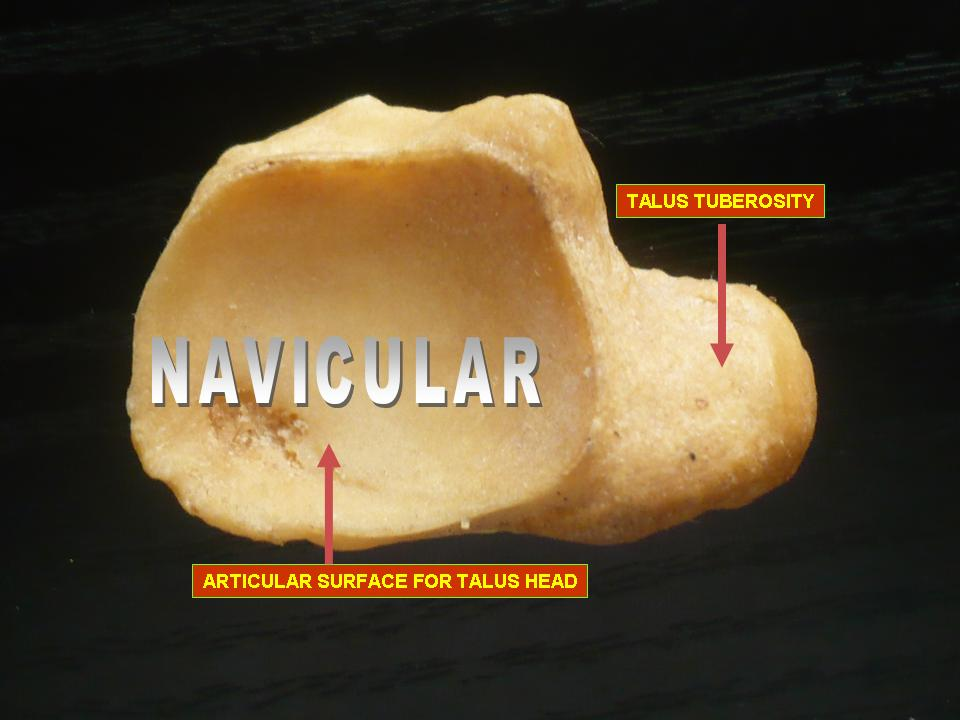
Navicular bone - posterior view

The navicular, deriving its name from its boat–like shape, is a small but critical bone. It connects the ankle with the bones of the foot. It articulates with five tarsal bones (talus, cuboid, and three cuneiform bones) forming slightly mobile syndesmotic (fibrous) joints and has a significant function in maintaining the arch and the dynamic biomechanics of walking. The middle third of the bone lacks blood vessel penetration and it bears the majority of the load applied to the tarsal bones during weight bearing. Its vascular and biomechanical properties make it susceptible to injury. This may partly explain a higher risk of stress fractures and osteonecrosis in this location. Athletes who run, cut and pivot are particularly susceptible to injuries in this area. It is known as the keystone of the foot and injuries to it can be "exasperating."

== Pathogenesis/pathomechanics ==
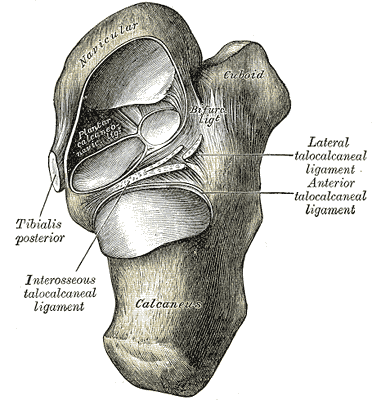
Talocalcaneonavicular articulations exposed from above by removing the talus

Mueller–Weiss syndrome had been traditionally considered a spontaneous osteonecrosis of the navicular bone, but there is no certain pathogenetic explanation. Pathologic evidence of osteonecrosis (empty lacunae) is seen in only a minority of pathological specimens. It is frequently bilateral and associated with increased body mass. Factors that have been thought to play a role include trauma, delayed ossification of the navicular and chronic biomechanical factors that put stress on the navicular. Multiple pathogenetic theories have been proposed over the years. Pathomechanic abnormalities involve shifting of the foot bones, which leads to a paradoxic flat foot, with a varus deformity instead of a valgus. Multiple ligaments and the posterior tibial tendon attach to the navicular. These perform a significant function in acting as a dynamic stabilizer and maintaining bipedal biomechanics.

Regardless of the exact cause, the pathogenesis of Mueller-Weiss syndrome is probably multifactorial and related to chronic loading on a suboptimally ossified navicular—a bone that is predisposed to central ischemia owing to its centripetal vascular perfusion arch.

== Diagnosis ==
Weight-bearing radiography of the foot is the mainstay in diagnosis. MRI can be useful early in the disease to separate MWS from mimics and demonstrate bone marrow changes and effusion in adjacent joints; this will help making a diagnosis before changes on conventional weight-bearing X-rays. Despite its distinctive radiological features, Mueller–Weiss syndrome is often a diagnosis of exclusion and is felt to be under-diagnosed.

Characteristic findings of conventional radiology include:

- Normal earliest in the disease
- Lateral collapse of the navicular
- Dorsomedial subluxation of the remnant navicular
- Lateral deviation of the talus

Severe disease may demonstrate:

- Pes planus (flat foot)
- Osteoarthritis of the talonavicular joint with or without the involvement of other midfoot joints

== Treatment ==
Treatment should be commenced as early as possible. Initial treatment is conservative, with modalities including immobilization with orthoses (such as a walking boot) or short leg casts, activity modification, injections, physical therapy, radio frequency ablation, and anti-inflammatories. Failure of conservative management is more likely in patients with mid-foot abduction and radiologically noted talonavicular arthritis. Surgical options are reserved for greater than six months of severe pain. There is no gold standard of treatment, with many surgical approaches.

== History ==
In 1927 Walther Mueller, a Leipzig orthopedic surgeon, reported a case that had severe damage to the navicular bone with compression and fragmentation.

I have recently had occasion to observe changes in the os naviculare pedis in the adult, which may have some similarities with the Köhler-like disease of the adolescents, which is not yet known in this form.

In 1929 Konrad Weiss, an Austrian radiologist, reported two patients with similar findings. The disease was named after them, though there had been a 1925 report by Georg Schmidt of a similar case, but with no images provided. Mueller believed the problem was congenital; Weiss believed it was an osteonecrotic process as the radiological findings were similar to Keinbock's disease, another osteonecrotic condition. Since then controversy has persisted around the cause and pathogenesis of the disease. In 1939 James Frederick Brailsford, an English radiologist, described nine cases in adult women. Mueller–Weiss syndrome is also known as Brailsford disease.

== Society and culture ==
Former tennis player Rafael Nadal has had symptoms of Mueller–Weiss in his left foot since the early part of his tennis career, being diagnosed in 2005 at age 19. He put off surgery as long as he could. He successfully continued his career after having surgery in 2021, winning the 2022 Australian and French Opens, though continuing to play through pain. In winning the French Open he had two numbing injections and anti-inflammatories before each of his seven matches to alleviate the pain; he won the tournament playing on a numb foot. He said he would not do this again. Regarding his injury:

I am not injured; I am a player living with an injury. It's something that is there, and unfortunately, my day by day is difficult, honestly. It's difficult for me to accept the situation sometimes.

== See also ==
- Köhler disease
