= Intestinal ischemia =

Restriction of blood flow to the small intestine resulting in injury

- Other names: Bowel ischemia
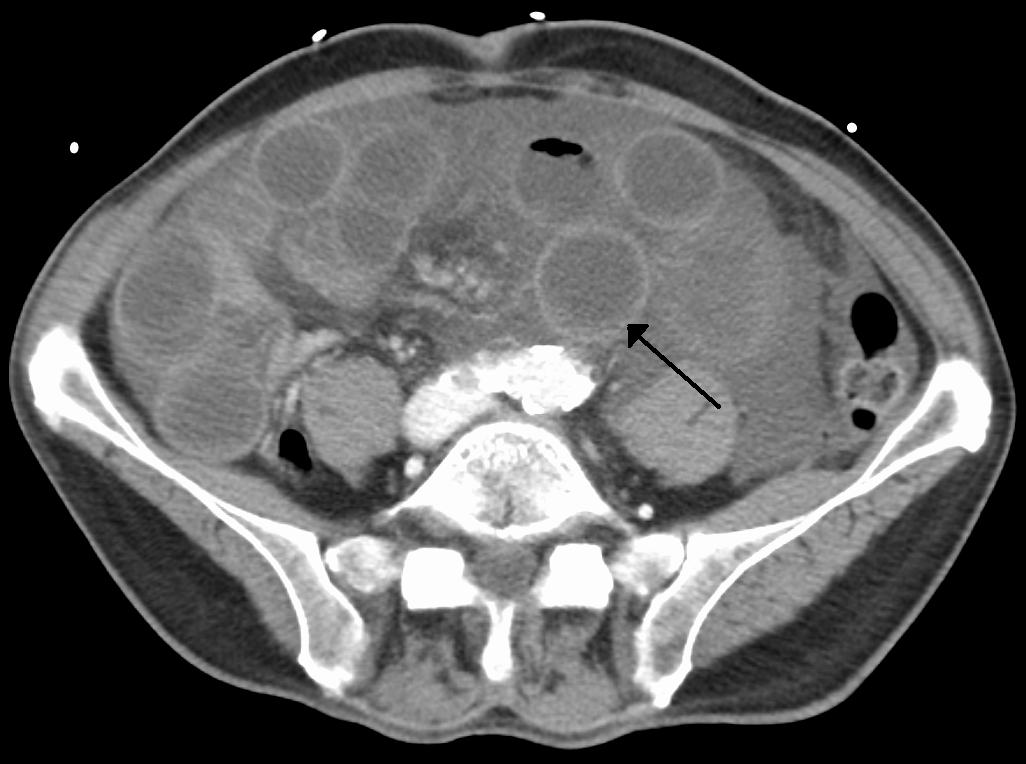
- Computed tomography (CT) showing dilated loops of small bowel with thickened walls (black arrow), findings characteristic of ischemic bowel due to thrombosis of the superior mesenteric vein.
- Specialty: General surgery, vascular surgery, gastroenterology
- Symptoms: Acute: sudden severe pain Chronic: abdominal pain after eating, unintentional weight loss, vomiting
- Usual onset: > 60 years old
- Types: Acute, chronic
- Risk factors: Atrial fibrillation, heart failure, chronic kidney failure, being prone to forming blood clots, previous myocardial infarction
- Diagnostic method: Angiography, computed tomography
- Treatment: Stenting, medications to break down clot, surgery
- Prognosis: ~80% risk of death
- Frequency: Acute: 5 per 100,000 per year (developed world); Chronic: 1 per 100,000

Intestinal ischemia is a medical condition in which injury to the large or small intestine occurs due to inadequate blood supply. Onset can be sudden, known as acute intestinal ischemia, or gradual, known as chronic intestinal ischemia. The acute form of the disease often presents with sudden severe abdominal pain and is associated with a high risk of death. The chronic form typically presents more gradually with abdominal pain after eating, unintentional weight loss, vomiting, and fear of eating.

Risk factors for acute intestinal ischemia include atrial fibrillation, heart failure, chronic kidney failure, being prone to forming blood clots, and previous myocardial infarction. There are four mechanisms by which poor blood flow occurs: a blood clot from elsewhere getting lodged in an artery, a new blood clot forming in an artery, a blood clot forming in the superior mesenteric vein, and insufficient blood flow due to low blood pressure or spasms of arteries. Chronic disease is a risk factor for acute disease. The best method of diagnosis is angiography, with computed tomography (CT) used when that is not available.

Treatment of acute ischemia may include stenting or medications to break down the clot provided at the site of obstruction by interventional radiology. Open surgery may also be used to remove or bypass the obstruction and may be required to remove any intestines that may have died. If not rapidly treated outcomes are often poor. Among those affected even with treatment the risk of death is 70% to 90%. In those with chronic disease bypass surgery is the treatment of choice. Those who have thrombosis of the vein may be treated with anticoagulation such as heparin and warfarin, with surgery used if they do not improve.

Acute intestinal ischemia affects about five per hundred thousand people per year in the developed world. Chronic intestinal ischemia affects about one per hundred thousand people. Most people affected are over 60 years old. Rates are about equal in males and females of the same age. Intestinal ischemia was first described in 1895.

== Signs and symptoms ==
While not always present and often overlapping, three progressive phases of intestinal ischemia have been described:

- A hyperactive stage occurs first, in which the primary symptoms are severe abdominal pain and the passage of bloody stools. Many patients get better and do not progress beyond this phase.
- A paralytic phase can follow if ischemia continues; in this phase, the abdominal pain becomes more widespread, the belly becomes more tender to the touch, and bowel motility decreases, resulting in abdominal bloating, no further bloody stools, and absent bowel sounds on exam.
- Finally, a shock phase can develop as fluids start to leak through the damaged colon lining. This can result in shock and metabolic acidosis with dehydration, low blood pressure, rapid heart rate, and confusion. Patients who progress to this phase are often critically ill and require intensive care.

=== Clinical findings ===
Symptoms of intestinal ischemia vary and can be acute (especially if embolic), subacute, or chronic.

Case series report prevalence of clinical findings and provide the best available, yet biased, estimate of the sensitivity of clinical findings. In a series of 58 patients with intestinal ischemia due to mixed causes:

- abdominal pain was present in 95% (median of 24 hours duration). The other three patients presented with shock and metabolic acidosis.
- nausea in 44%
- vomiting in 35%
- diarrhea in 35%
- heart rate > 100 in 33%
- rectal bleeding in 16% (not stated if this number also included occult blood – presumably not)
- constipation in 7%

=== Diagnostic heuristics ===
In the absence of adequate quantitative studies to guide diagnosis, various heuristics help guide diagnosis:

- Intestinal ischemia "should be suspected when individuals, especially those at high risk for acute intestinal ischemia, develop severe and persisting abdominal pain that is disproportionate to their abdominal findings", or simply, pain out of proportion to exam.
- Regarding intestinal arterial thrombosis or embolism: "early symptoms are present and are relatively mild in 50% of cases for three to four days before medical attention is sought".
- Regarding intestinal arterial thrombosis or embolism: "Any patient with an arrhythmia such as atrial fibrillation who complains of abdominal pain is highly suspected of having embolization of the superior mesenteric artery until proven otherwise."
- Regarding nonocclusive intestinal ischemia: "Any patient who takes digitalis and diuretics and who complains of abdominal pain must be considered to have nonocclusive ischemia until proven otherwise."

== Diagnosis ==
It is difficult to diagnose intestinal ischemia early.

=== Blood tests ===
In a series of 58 patients with intestinal ischemia due to mixed causes:

- White blood cell count >10.5 in 98% (probably an overestimate as only tested in 81% of patients)
- Lactic acid elevated 91% (probably an overestimate as only tested in 57% of patients)

In very early or very extensive acute intestinal ischemia, elevated lactate and white blood cell count may not yet be present. In extensive mesenteric ischemia, bowel may be ischemic but separated from the blood flow such that the byproducts of ischemia are not yet circulating.

=== During endoscopy ===
A number of devices have been used to assess the sufficiency of oxygen delivery to the colon. The earliest devices were based on tonometry, and required time to equilibrate and estimate the pHi, roughly an estimate of local CO_{2} levels. The first device approved by the U.S. FDA (in 2004) used visible light spectroscopy to analyze capillary oxygen levels. Use during aortic aneurysm repair detected when colon oxygen levels fell below sustainable levels, allowing real-time repair. In several studies, specificity has been 83% for chronic intestinal ischemia and 90% or higher for acute colonic ischemia, with a sensitivity of 71–92%. This device must be placed using endoscopy, however.

Findings on gastroscopy may include edematous gastric mucosa, and hyperperistalsis.

Finding on colonoscopy may include: fragile mucosa, segmental erythema, longitudinal ulcer, and loss of haustrations.

=== Plain X-ray ===
Plain X-rays are often normal or show non-specific findings.

=== Computed tomography ===
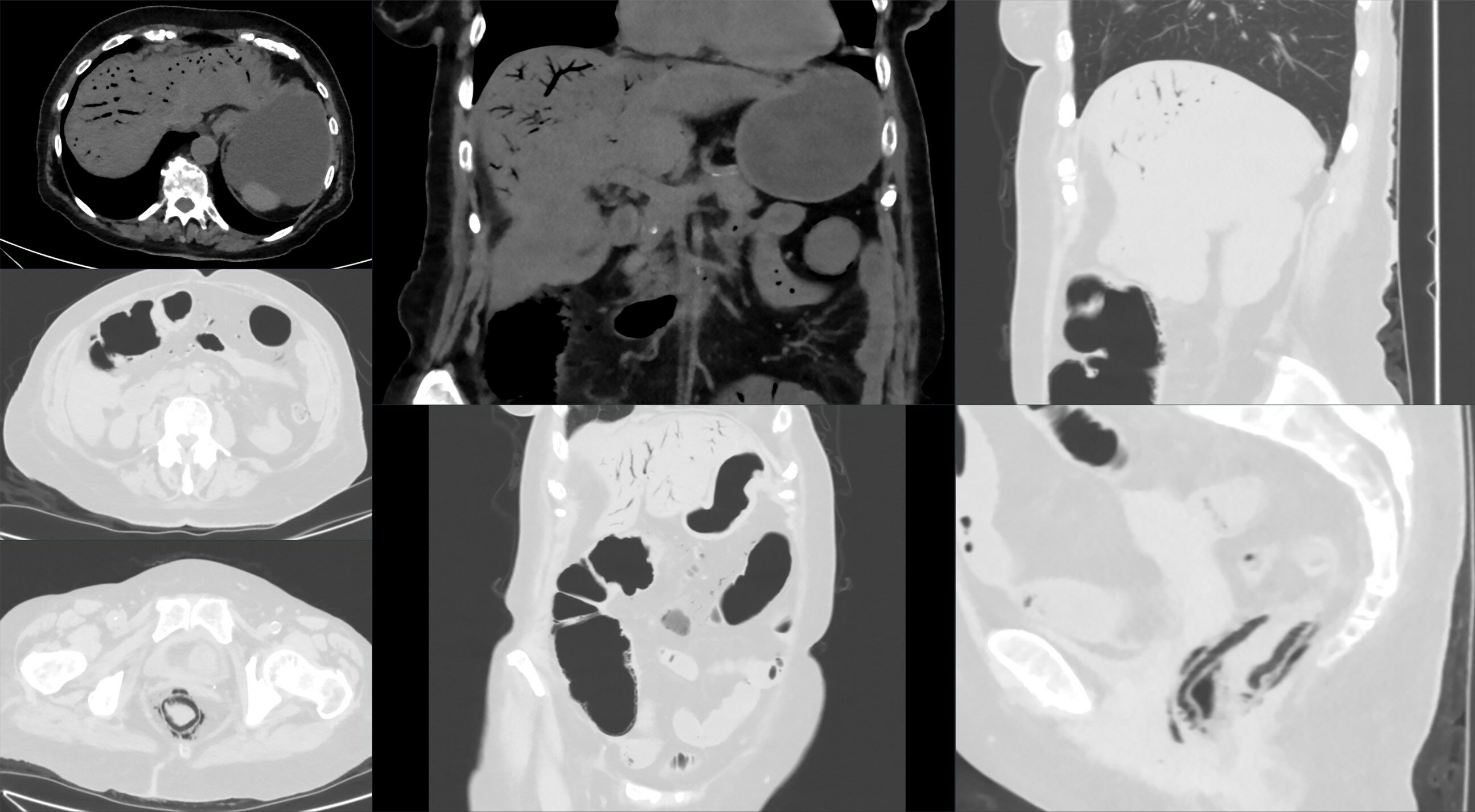
CT image showing mesenteric ischemia with pneumatosis intestinalis and gas in mesenterial and liver veins

Computed tomography (CT scan) is often used. The accuracy of the CT scan depends on whether a small bowel obstruction (SBO) is present.

SBO absent

- prevalence of intestinal ischemia 23%
- sensitivity 64%
- specificity 92%
- positive predictive value (at prevalence of 23%) 79%
- negative predictive value (at prevalence of 23%) 95%

SBO present

- prevalence of intestinal ischemia 62%
- sensitivity 83%
- specificity 93%
- positive predictive value (at prevalence of 62%) 93%
- negative predictive value (at prevalence of 62%) 61%

Early findings on CT scan include:

- Intestinal mesenteric edema
- Bowel dilatation
- Bowel wall thickening
- Intestinal mesenteric stranding
- Evidence of adjacent solid organ infarctions to the kidney or spleen, consistent with a cardiac embolic shower phenomenon

In embolic acute intestinal ischemia, CT-Angiography can be of great value for diagnosis and treatment. It may reveal the emboli itself lodged in the superior mesenteric artery, as well as the presence or absence of distal mesenteric branches.

Late findings, which indicate dead bowel, include:

- Intramural bowel gas
- Portal venous gas
- Free abdominal air

=== Angiography ===
As the cause of the ischemia can be due to embolic or thrombotic occlusion of the mesenteric vessels or nonocclusive ischemia, the best way to differentiate between the etiologies is through the use of mesenteric angiography. Though it has serious risks, angiography provides the possibility of direct infusion of vasodilators in the setting of nonocclusive ischemia.

== Treatment ==
The treatment of intestinal ischemia depends on the cause and can be medical or surgical. However, if bowel has become necrotic, the only treatment is surgical removal of the dead segments of bowel.

In non-occlusive disease, where there is no blockage of the arteries supplying the bowel, the treatment is medical rather than surgical. People are admitted to the hospital for resuscitation with intravenous fluids, careful monitoring of laboratory tests, and optimization of their cardiovascular function. NG tube decompression and heparin anticoagulation may also be used to limit stress on the bowel and optimize perfusion, respectively.

Surgical revascularisation remains the treatment of choice for intestinal ischaemia related to an occlusion of the vessels supplying the bowel, but thrombolytic medical treatment and vascular interventional radiological techniques have a growing role.

If the ischemia has progressed to the point that the affected intestinal segments are gangrenous, a bowel resection of those segments is called for. Often, obviously dead segments are removed at the first operation, and a second-look operation is planned to assess segments that are borderline that may be savable after revascularization.

=== Methods for revascularization ===
- Open surgical thrombectomy
- Intestinal bypass
- Trans-femoral antegrade intestinal angioplasty and stenting
- Open retrograde intestinal angioplasty stenting
- Trans-catheter thrombolysis

== Prognosis ==
The prognosis depends on prompt diagnosis (less than 12–24 hours and before gangrene) and the underlying cause:

- venous thrombosis: 32% mortality
- arterial embolism: 54% mortality
- arterial thrombosis: 77% mortality
- non-occlusive ischemia: 73% mortality.

In the case of prompt diagnosis and therapy, acute intestinal ischemia can be reversible.

== History ==
Acute intestinal ischemia was first described in 1895, while chronic disease was first described in the 1940s. Chronic disease was initially known as angina abdominis.

== Terminology ==
The related term mesenteric ischemia or small intestine ischemia generally defined as ischemia of the small bowel specifically. It has also been defined as poor circulation in the vessels supplying blood flow to any or several of the mesenteric organs, including the stomach, liver, colon and intestine. The terms colonic ischemia, large intestine ischemia, or ischemic colitis refers to ischemia of the large bowel.

=== In the large intestine ===
Ischemia of the large intestine (colon) is termed ischemic colitis. Although uncommon in the general population, ischemic colitis occurs with greater frequency in the elderly, and is the most common form of bowel ischemia. Causes of the reduced blood flow can include changes in the systemic circulation (e.g. low blood pressure), or local factors such as constriction of blood vessels or a blood clot. In most cases, no specific cause can be identified.

Ischemic colitis is usually suspected on the basis of the clinical setting, physical examination, and laboratory test results; the diagnosis can be confirmed by endoscopy or by using sigmoid or endoscopic placement of a visible light spectroscopic catheter (see Diagnosis). Ischemic colitis can span a wide spectrum of severity; most patients are treated supportively and recover fully, while a minority with very severe ischemia may develop sepsis and become critically, sometimes even fatally, ill.

Patients with mild to moderate ischemic colitis are usually treated with IV fluids, analgesia, and bowel rest (that is, no food or water by mouth) until the symptoms resolve. Those with severe ischemia who develop complications such as sepsis, intestinal gangrene, or bowel perforation may require more aggressive interventions, such as surgery and intensive care. Most patients make a full recovery; occasionally, after severe ischemia, patients may develop long-term complications such as a stricture or chronic colitis.
