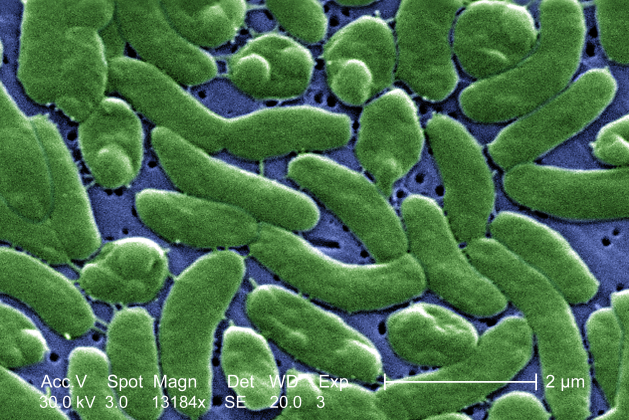
- False-color SEM image of Vibrio vulnificus

Scientific classification
- Domain: Bacteria
- Kingdom: Pseudomonadati
- Phylum: Pseudomonadota
- Class: Gammaproteobacteria
- Order: Vibrionales
- Family: Vibrionaceae
- Genus: Vibrio
- Species: V. vulnificus

Binomial name
- Vibrio vulnificus (Reichelt et al. 1976); Farmer 1979

Synonyms
- Beneckea vulnifica

= Vibrio vulnificus =

Species of pathogenic bacterium found in water

Vibrio vulnificus is a species of Gram-negative, motile, curved rod-shaped (vibrio), pathogenic bacteria of the genus Vibrio. Present in marine environments such as estuaries, brackish ponds, or coastal areas, V. vulnificus is related to V. cholerae, the causative agent of cholera. At least one strain of V. vulnificus is bioluminescent. Increasing seasonal ocean temperatures and low-salt marine environments like estuaries favor a greater concentration of Vibrio within filter-feeding shellfish; V. vulnificus infections in the Eastern United States have increased eightfold from 1988 to 2018.

Infection with V. vulnificus leads to rapidly expanding skin infections by entering a wound causing cellulitis or even sepsis. V. vulnificus is also a source of foodborne illness. It was first isolated as a source of disease in 1976.

== Strains ==
Vibrio vulnificus is a species of gram-negative, motile, curved rod-shaped (bacillus), pathogenic bacteria of the genus Vibrio. Present in marine environments such as estuaries, brackish ponds, or coastal areas, V. vulnificus is related to V. cholerae, the causative agent of cholera. The most harmful strains of V. vulnificus documented have been observed in three different forms. The first is when there is a layer of protective sugar molecules surrounding the bacteria called an anti-phagocytic polysaccharide capsule. By encapsulating the bacteria, phagocytosis and opsonization can not occur, thus allowing the bacteria to continue throughout the organism it is in. The second way that V. vulnificus has been most harmful is with some of the toxins that it creates. These toxins are not part of the infection that V. vulnificus causes but instead they are part of a secondary infection in the gastrointestinal tract that most certainly will lead to systemic infection. Lastly, V. vulnificus has been seen to cause more harm in patients who have higher levels of iron.

=== Genome size ===
The genome size of V. vulnificus is approximately 5.3 Mbp. The genome is organized into two circular replicons, similar to that of V. cholerae, which also has a large and a small chromosome. However, the genome of V. vulnificus is at least one megabase bigger.

=== Natural transformation ===
Natural transformation is a bacterial adaptation for DNA transfer between individual cells. V. vulnificus was found to become naturally transformable during growth on chitin in the form of crab shells. The ability to now carry out transformation experiments in the laboratory should facilitate molecular genetic analysis of this opportunistic pathogen.

=== Biotypes and genotypes ===
V. vulnificus has at least 3 biotypes. Biotype 1, which was the first to be isolated, is the biotype responsible for virtually all human infections. Within biotype 1, two distinct genotypes have been isolated, the C-genotype (clinical) and the E-genotype (environmental). The C-genotype is associated with human clinical cases, and carries specific genes that increase virulence and resistance to serum killing. The E-genotype has been isolated from oysters and water, and possesses unique genes associated with enhanced environmental survival. This discovery has led to the proposal that V. vulnificus exists as two divergent ecotypes.

Biotype 2, which has rarely been isolated in humans, primarily infects farm-raised eels, causing a fatal septicemia. Biotype 3 is thought to be a hybrid of biotypes 1 and 2, and has only been isolated in human wound infections after an outbreak in an Israeli tilapia aquaculture in 1996.

== Pathogenesis ==
=== Capsule ===
V. vulnificus has a capsule, made of polysaccharides, and is thought to protect against phagocytosis. The capsule also aids the bacteria in escaping opsonization. Different strains of the bacteria are capable of shifting through the unencapsulated and encapsulated forms. Mouse models have shown that the unencapsulated forms are avirulent. These same strains, however, are more likely to be in their encapsulated form when taken up by oysters. Varying levels of oxygen determine the amount of capsular production. Oxygen levels increase the amount of capsule the bacteria can make. Out of the two genotypes the strain commonly found in the environment showed a higher level of capsular production than the one found in human infections. In low oxygen conditions the capsule appears thin and translucent, while it is normally supposed to be thicker and more opaque.

=== Biofilm ===
V. vulnificus creates less biofilm under anaerobic conditions, when in most bacteria the opposite is the case. Genotypes that are found more in the environment show this correlation more than the genotypes found in human infection. Environmental strains such as temperature change also play a role in the formation of biofilms, with lower temperatures increasing the production. Strains found in human infection showed more biofilm formation at temperatures of 24 °C than environmental strains, showing these strains are adapted for their environments.

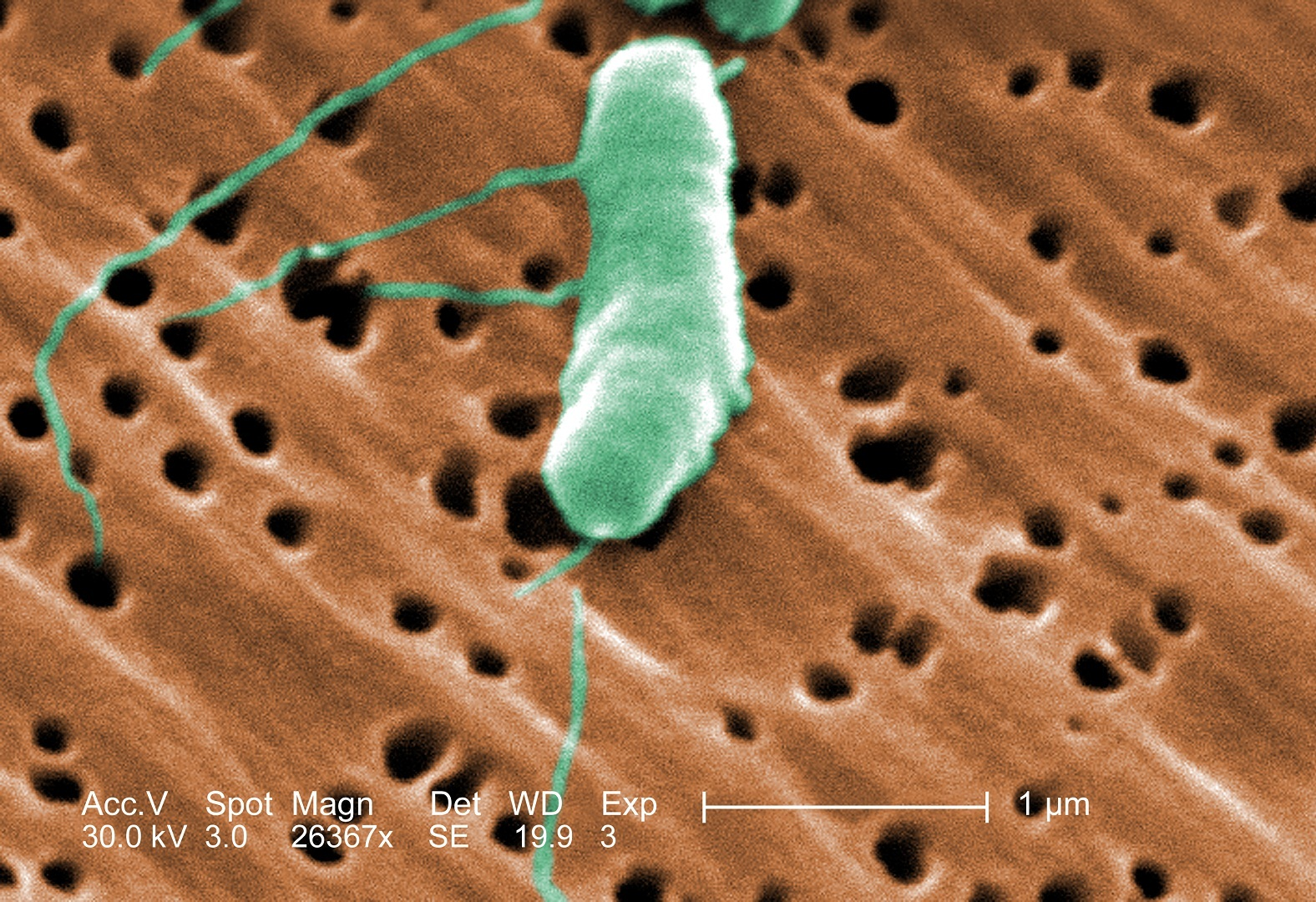
Colorized scanning electron micrograph (SEM) of a flagellated Vibrio vulnificus bacterium. The image shows the curved, rod-shaped morphology and polar flagella that aid in bacterial motility.

=== Endotoxin ===
Like all gram-negative bacteria, V. vulnificus has LPS (lipopolysaccharide) as the major component of its outer membrane. However, the LPS the bacteria produces isn't as efficient at triggering the immune system's release of tumor necrosis factor (TNF) alpha and other cytokines that produce shock syndromes. The capsular proteins the bacteria express, however, are capable of producing an immune response contributing to shock syndrome.

=== Exotoxin ===
V. vulnificus produces a number of extracellular toxins such as metalloprotease VvpE, cytolysin/hemolysin VvhA, and the multifunctional autoprocessing repeats-in-toxins (MARTX) toxin. These exotoxins are released to promote damage of host tissue, aid the spread of bacteria through the body, and evade immune defenses.

Most prominently, MARTX toxin attaches to the cell membrane of host cells and injects effector domains which cause a cascade of effectors that aid the bacteria's binding ability, discontinue maintenance of cell skeleton, block autophagy, and disrupt internal cell signaling. Another exotoxin, PlpA breaks down host cell membranes and works with MARTX to cause necrotic damage. Two exotoxins, VvhA and VvpE are not essential in the pathogens ability to cause disease, but in combination with MARTX they are able to drastically worsen the infection. VvhA creates pores in cells to promote apoptosis, inflammation, and cytokine storms while VvpE breaks down proteins making colonization easier.

These exotoxins collaborate to maximize infection, tissue damage and immune disruption. Different strains can have a different combination of exotoxins and MARTX effectors, explaining how the severity of infection and symptoms can differ. While the VvhA and MARTX toxin are factors in the bacteria's virulence, in vivo studies in mice suggest that the MARTX toxin is more responsible for bacterial dissemination from the intestine to produce sepsis.

=== Iron ===
Growth of V. vulnificus is dependent on the amount of iron that is accessible to the bacteria. The observed association of the infection with liver disease (associated with increased serum iron) might be due to the capability of more virulent strains to capture iron bound to transferrin.

=== Flagellum ===
V. vulnificus is a motile bacterium that uses a polar flagellum to swim. The flagellum allows the bacterium to move to more favorable conditions. Motility also contributes to pathogenesis as it facilitates adhesion to host cells, biofilm formation, and colonization. Experimental studies have shown that mutants lacking a functional flagellum exhibit reduced movement, decreased adherence to epithelial cells, impaired biofilm formation, and lower virulence in animal models.

=== Type IV pilus ===
V. vulnificus has genes that encode for the biosynthesis of a type IV pilus. These genes have been located on the large chromosome and may help V. vulnificus adhere to host cells and with motility.

=== Quorum sensing ===
V. vulnificus uses a quorum-sensing (QS) system in communication and virulence gene regulation. The QS system controls SmcR, which is the principal protein that regulates the expression of virulence genes, including CPS-related genes that promote capsular polysaccharide synthesis and the metalloproteinase gene vvpE. The QS system of V. vulnificus is also related to a regulation of bacterial biofilm formation and plays a role in activation and suppression of toxins and enzymes that are key to the pathogenesis of the bacteria. At a low cell density, the QS communicates to suppress the expression of SmcR, effectively inactivating virulence genes, and at high cell density, the QS system works to signal the expression of SmcR, thus activating virulence genes.

== Growth and metabolism ==
V. vulnificus requires many specific nutrients in order to grow and proliferate. The proliferation of V. vulnificus is significantly higher during algal blooms, when an excess of nutrients from runoff or temperature changes occur. This bacteria is classified as a facultative anaerobe and a chemoorganoheterotroph, which means it gets its energy from chemical compounds and uses organic molecules for electron and carbon sources. It uses various organic molecules, which become more abundant prior to an algal bloom. V. vulnificus processes glucose and many other carbohydrates through the Embden-Meyerhof Parnas (EMP) pathway for glycolysis. Pyruvate generated from this pathway and others contribute to the tricarboxylic acid (TCA) cycle that produces electron sources for the bacterium's electron transport chain. V. vulnificus is usually found in brackish waters, like estuaries, where freshwater mixes with ocean saltwater. However, with the increase of nutrients that bring algal blooms, V. vulnificus proliferates in the same conditions. In fact, the phytoplankton that form an algal bloom produce a gas, Dimethylsulfoniopropionate (DMSP) that bacteria can utilize as an osmoprotectant. The combination of increased nutrients and ability to protect itself from high salinity is what drives V. vulnificus growth in the ocean.

=== Alternative carbon sources ===
When preferred carbon sources are limited, Vibrio vulnificus is able to use a broad range of alternative carbon sources which contributes to its success in survival and growth in its environments. Recent studies have found that V. vulnificus's use of alternative carbon sources, namely glycerol, mannitol, pyruvate, maltose, trehalose, and propylene glycol, influences the expression of virulence genes. Specifically, mannitol and propylene glycol were found to strongly reduce the transcription of virulence-related genes.

== Infection ==
In the United States, Vibrio vulnificus is responsible for 95% of all seafood-related mortalities. Vibrio vulnificus infections have a 33% mortality rate, which is the highest mortality rate of all food-borne illnesses in the United States. The infection can lead to many diseases, including gastroenteritis, cellulitis, necrotizing fasciitis, and sepsis.

=== Sources ===
Vibrio vulnificus typically breeds in warm coastal waters. Infection generally arises from the consumption of V. vulnificus contaminated seafood or exposure of open wounds to contaminated seawater. The bacteria has been observed in oysters, crabs, clams, shrimp, mussels, mullets, and seabass; however, oysters consumption has historically been the most common source of infection. Infection via consumption typically occurs with inoculation of at least 1 million V. vulnificus bacteria.

=== Symptoms ===
Vibrio vulnificus is an extremely dangerous bacterium that can cause three types of infections:

- Acute gastroenteritis from eating raw or undercooked shellfish: V. vulnificus causes an infection often incurred after eating seafood, especially raw or undercooked oysters. It does not alter the appearance, taste, or odor of oysters. Symptoms include vomiting, diarrhea, and abdominal pain.
- Invasive sepsis can occur after eating raw or undercooked shellfish, especially oysters. V. vulnificus is 80 times more likely to spread into the bloodstream in people with compromised immune systems, especially those with chronic liver disease. When this happens, severe symptoms including blistering skin lesions and septic shock can sometimes lead to death. This severe infection may occur regardless of whether the infection began from contaminated food or an open wound.
- Necrotizing wound infections can occur in injured skin exposed to contaminated marine water. V. vulnificus bacteria can enter the body through open wounds when swimming or wading in infected waters, or by puncture wounds from the spines of fishes such as stingrays. People may develop a blistering dermatitis sometimes mistaken for pemphigus or pemphigoid.

Among healthy people, ingestion of V. vulnificus can cause vomiting, diarrhea, and abdominal pain. In someone with a compromised immune system, particularly those with chronic liver disease, it can infect the bloodstream, causing a severe and life-threatening illness characterized by fever and chills, decreased blood pressure (septic shock), and blistering skin lesions. While men have been shown to be more at risk from this infection than women, co-morbidities such as alcoholic cirrhosis and diseases affecting the endocrine system (diabetes, rheumatoid arthritis, etc.) put a person far more at risk of developing an infection from V. vulnificus.

=== Treatment ===
Vibrio vulnificus wound infections have a mortality rate of around 25%. In people in whom the infection worsens into sepsis, typically following ingestion, the mortality rate rises to 50%. The majority of these people die within the first 48 hours of infection. The optimal treatment is not known, but in one retrospective study of 93 people in Taiwan, the use of a third-generation cephalosporin and a tetracycline (e.g., ceftriaxone and doxycycline, respectively) was associated with an improved outcome. Prospective clinical trials are needed to confirm this finding, but in vitro data support the suggestion that this combination is synergistic against V. vulnificus. Likewise, the American Medical Association and the Centers for Disease Control and Prevention (CDC) recommend treating the person with a quinolone or intravenous doxycycline with ceftazidime. The first successful documented treatment of fulminant V. vulnificus sepsis was in 1995. Treatment was ceftazidime and intravenous (IV) ciprofloxacin and IV doxycycline, which proved successful. Prevention of secondary infections from respiratory failure and acute renal failure is crucial. Key to the diagnosis and treatment were the early recognition of bullae in an immunocompromised person with liver cirrhosis and oyster ingestion within the previous 48 hours, and the request by the physician for STAT Gram staining and blood cultures for V. vulnificus. Amputation of limbs may be required. Vibrio vulnificus often causes large, disfiguring ulcers that require extensive debridement or even amputation.

=== Prognosis ===
Vibrio vulnificus is the most common cause of death due to seafood in the United States, causing over 95% of deaths that are known to have occurred due to ingested seafood. If treatment with tetracycline or other cephalosporin antibiotics is initiated at the onset of symptoms and the full course followed, patients generally experience no long-term effects.

The worst prognosis is in those people arriving at the hospital in a state of shock. Total mortality in treated people (ingestion and wound) is around 33%.

People especially vulnerable are those with liver disease (especially cirrhosis and hepatitis) or immunocompromised states (some kinds of cancer, bone marrow suppression, HIV, diabetes, etc.). In these cases, V. vulnificus usually enters the bloodstream, where it may cause fever and chills, septic shock (with sharply decreased blood pressure), and blistering skin lesions. About half of those who contract blood infections die.

The consumption of contaminated raw oysters in those with chronic liver disease causes primary sepsis with a mortality rate of over 50%. Exposure of wounds to contaminated seawater or handling of contaminated seafood products causes infections with a mortality rate of about 25%.

Vibrio vulnificus infections also disproportionately affect males; 85% of those developing endotoxic shock from the bacteria are male. Females having had an oophorectomy experienced increased mortality rates, as estrogen has been shown experimentally to have a protective effect against V. vulnificus.

== Epidemiology ==
Vibrio vulnificus is commonly found in the Gulf of Mexico, where more than a dozen people have died from the infection since 1990. Most deaths at that time were occurring due to fulminant sepsis, either in the area of oyster harvest and ingestion, or in tourists returning home. Lack of disease recognition, and also of the risk factors, presentation, and cause, were and are major obstacles to good outcome and recovery.

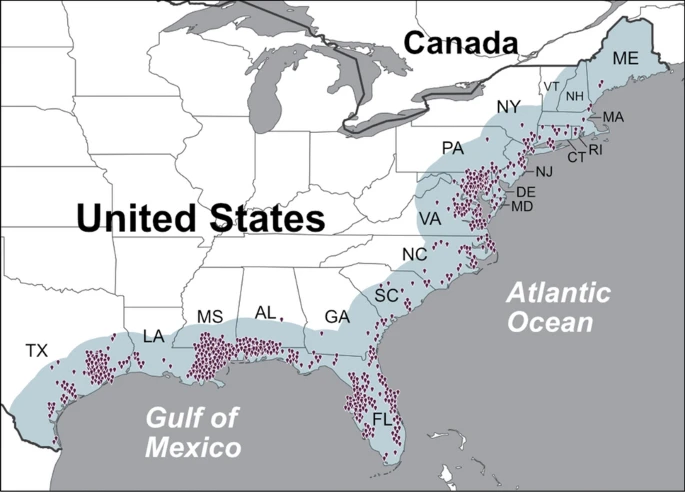
Map illustrating the distribution ofVibrio vulnificus infections along the coastal United States. Cases are concentrated in warm, brackish waters along the Atlantic coasts and Gulf of Mexico, where the bacterium naturally occurs.

Increasing seasonal temperatures and decreasing salinity levels seem to favor a greater concentration of Vibrio within filter-feeding shellfish of the U.S. Atlantic seaboard and the Gulf of Mexico, especially oysters (Crassostrea virginica). Scientists have frequently demonstrated the presence of V. vulnificus in the gut of oysters and other shellfish and in the intestines of fish that inhabit oyster reefs. The vast majority of people who develop sepsis from V. vulnificus became ill after they ate raw oysters; most of these cases have been men.

According to the CDC, V. vulnificus infections in the Eastern United States increased eightfold from 1988 to 2018 and the border of where these infections occur has migrated 48 km northward each year. In July–August 2023, Connecticut, New York, and North Carolina reported severe and fatal V. vulnificus infections. On August 8, 2025, a V. vulnificus infection was confirmed in a swimmer who had swum with an open wound at a Falmouth, Massachusetts beach.

== History ==
The pathogen was first isolated in 1976 from a series of blood culture samples submitted to the CDC in Atlanta. It was described as a "lactose-positive vibrio". It was initially given the name Beneckea vulnifica, and then finally the name Vibrio vulnificus by J. J. Farmer in 1979. Vulnificus is derived from Latin meaning wounding or wound-making.

In 2005, health officials identified strains of V. vulnificus infections among evacuees from New Orleans due to the flooding there caused by Hurricane Katrina.

In 2015, eight cases of V. vulnificus infection were reported in Florida, with two resulting in death.

In 2022, following Hurricane Ian, Lee County, Florida, saw a sharp rise in infections and deaths from V. vulnificus. By October 18, 2022, four deaths and 29 illnesses had been recorded since the landfall of the hurricane in late September.

In 2023, it was reported that a 40-year-old woman from California had been infected by Vibrio vulnificus after eating undercooked fish (tilapia). She had her four limbs removed to save her life. However, upon further investigation, local public health officials reported no evidence of V. vulnificus infection in her case.

In August 2026, the Louisiana Department of Health issued an urgent public health warning following an abnormal surge in Vibrio vulnificus infections, which resulted in nine documented cases and five deaths. All reported infections occurred in individuals with underlying medical conditions who exposed open wounds to warm seawater during the peak bacterial season between May and October. This sharp increase represents a significant spike above Louisiana's historical baseline, where the state typically averages seven infections and a single fatality annually.

== See also ==
- Necrotizing fasciitis
