= Interspecies quorum sensing =

Interspecies quorum sensing is a type of quorum sensing in which bacteria send and receive signals to other species besides their own. This is accomplished by the secretion of signaling molecules which trigger a response in nearby bacteria at high enough concentrations. Once the molecule hits a certain concentration it triggers the transcription of certain genes such as virulence factors. It has been discovered that bacteria can not only interact via quorum sensing with members of their own species but that there is a kind of universal molecule that allows them to gather information about other species as well. This universal molecule is called autoinducer 2 or AI-2.

AI-2 was first discovered in the light producing system of the bacteria Vibrio harveyi. The pathway that induces V. harveyi luminescence is controlled by two parallel pathways. The first pathway uses a typical AI-1 homoserine lactone signaling molecule. However the bacteria were also found to recognize a second auto inducer AI-2. Scientist also found that V. harveyi luminescence could be induced by 75 other bacterial species AI-2 molecules. This discovery led to the proposal of AI-2 as a universal form of communication between bacteria species. In addition to information about cell densities AI-2 can provide information on the growth phase and prosperity of cells in a population. It has a greater ability to store information than other quorum-sensing molecules because its production is tied to cell growth. The production of AI-2 peaks in late log phase for many bacteria. The structure of AI-2 was discovered recently to be a fused 2-member ring with boron bridging the gap between the diesters.

The enzyme LuxS is responsible for AI-2 synthesis. The gene encoding for LuxS has been detected in 35 of the 89 bacterial genomes sequenced and in all of the bacteria the gene had little variation. In every bacterium found so far that produces the AI-2 signaling molecule the LuxS gene was also found. There are three enzymes that make DPD (4,5-dihydroxy 2,3 pentanedione) which is the substrate LuxS uses to make AI-2. The pathway for synthesizing AI-2 was found to be identical in V. harveyi, Escherichia coli, Salmonella typhimurium, V. cholerae, and Enterococcus faecalis providing further evidence that this molecule may be a universal signal among bacteria.

Shigella flexneri use AI-2 to mediate virulence. The major virulence factor in Shigella is the plasmid vir B. The AI-2 signaling pathway was shown to be responsible for the observed peak of vir B. Although it was determined that AI-2 is not crucial for virulence that it does increase the expression of the plasmid. AI-2 also regulates the virulence of enteroinvasive and enterohemoragic E. coli. It is likely the high concentrations of AI-2 produced by normal gut flora effect the production of AI-2 in Shigella and its subsequent virulence.

AI-2 is required for the biofilm formation in Porphyromonas gingivalis and Streptococcus gordonii. S. gordonii is a major cause of dental plaque and its adherence is essential for many other pathogenic bacteria to also adhere to teeth. P. gingivalis causes periodontal disease. If neither bacteria possess a functional copy of the LuxS gene they cannot form a biofilm. However, if either one of the bacteria has the LuxS gene they can form biofilms, suggesting again this molecule is used for communication between unrelated species.

Other bacterial uses for AI-2

- Clostridium perfringens – regulates toxin production
- Photorhabdus luminescens – controls the timing of antibiotics
- Vibrio cholerae – used in the pathogenic cascade

Since the LuxS enzyme is not present in eukaryotes it is a good potential target for antibiotics. Also AI-2 signaling seems to control many virulence factors in bacteria so blocking this signal could lead to new ways to control bacterial infections such as cholera. Since the AI-2 molecule seems to be involved in the virulence cascade if we could block the uptake of AI-2 then we could potentially stop the virulence cascade.

Fungi also communicate with one another. Quorum-sensing molecules (QSMs) from fungi include farnesol, tyrosol, phenylethanol, and tryptophol. QSMs have been studied in Candida albicans, C. dubliniensis, Aspergillus niger, A. nidulans, and Fusarium graminearum. QSMs can include morphogenesis, germination, apotopsis, pathogenicity, and biofilm structures.

== See also ==
- Cell signaling
- Quorum sensing
