= LuxR-type DNA-binding HTH domain =

Bacterial regulatory proteins, luxR family
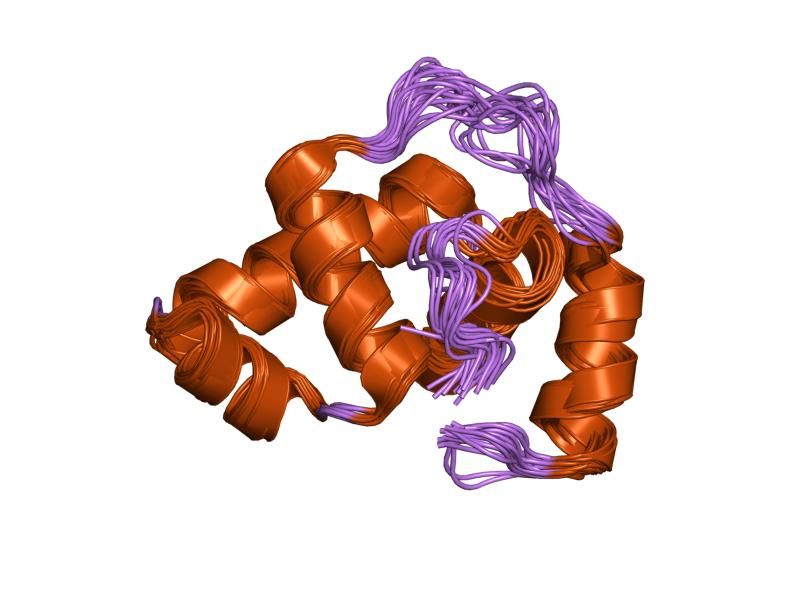
- solution structure of the dna-binding domain of the erwinia amylovora rcsb protein

Identifiers
- Symbol: GerE
- Pfam: PF00196
- Pfam clan: CL0123
- InterPro: IPR000792
- PROSITE: PDOC00542
- SCOP2: 1rnl / SCOPe / SUPFAM
Available protein structures:
- Pfam: structures / ECOD
- PDB: RCSB PDB; PDBe; PDBj
- PDBsum: structure summary

In molecular biology, the LuxR-type DNA-binding HTH domain is a DNA-binding, helix-turn-helix (HTH) domain of about 65 amino acids. It is present in transcription regulators of the LuxR/FixJ family of response regulators. The domain is named after Vibrio fischeri luxR, a transcriptional activator for quorum-sensing control of luminescence. LuxR-type HTH domain proteins occur in a variety of organisms. The DNA-binding HTH domain is usually located in the C-terminal region of the protein; the N-terminal region often containing an autoinducer-binding domain or a response regulatory domain. Most luxR-type regulators act as transcription activators, but some can be repressors or have a dual role for different sites. LuxR-type HTH regulators control a wide variety of activities in various biological processes.

The luxR-type, DNA-binding HTH domain forms a four-helical bundle structure. The HTH motif comprises the second and third helices, known as the scaffold and recognition helix, respectively. The HTH binds DNA in the major groove, where the N-terminal part of the recognition helix makes most of the DNA contacts. The fourth helix is involved in dimerisation of gerE and traR. Signalling events by one of the four activation mechanisms described below lead to multimerisation of the regulator. The regulators bind DNA as multimers.

LuxR-type HTH proteins can be activated by one of four different mechanisms:

1. Regulators which belong to a two-component sensory transduction system where the protein is activated by its phosphorylation, generally on an aspartate residue, by a transmembrane kinase. Some proteins that belong to this category are:

- Rhizobiaceae fixJ (global regulator inducing expression of nitrogen-fixation genes in microaerobiosis)
- Escherichia coli and Salmonella typhimurium uhpA (activates hexose phosphate transport gene uhpT)
- E. coli narL and narP (activate nitrate reductase operon)
- Enterobacteria rcsB (regulation of exopolysaccharide biosynthesis in enteric and plant pathogenesis)
- Bordetella pertussis bvgA (virulence factor)
- Bacillus subtilis comA (involved in expression of late-expressing competence genes)

2. Regulators which are activated, or in very rare cases repressed, when bound to N-acyl homoserine lactones, which are used as quorum sensing molecules in a variety of Gram-negative bacteria:

- Vibrio fischeri luxR (activates bioluminescence operon)
- Agrobacterium tumefaciens traR (regulation of Ti plasmid transfer)
- Erwinia carotovora carR (control of carbapenem antibiotics biosynthesis)
- E. carotovora expR (virulence factor for soft rot disease; activates plant tissue macerating enzyme genes)
- Pseudomonas aeruginosa lasR (activates elastase gene lasB)
- Erwinia chrysanthemi echR and Erwinia stewartii esaR
- Pseudomonas chlororaphis phzR (positive regulator of phenazine antibiotic production)
- Pseudomonas aeruginosa rhlR (activates rhlAB operon and lasB gene)
- Acinetobacter baumannii abaR (activates operon for production of surfactant-like lipopeptide acinetin-505)

3. Autonomous effector domain regulators, without a regulatory domain, represented by gerE.

- B. subtilis gerE (transcription activator and repressor for the regulation of spore formation)

4. Multiple ligand-binding regulators, exemplified by malT.

- E. coli malT (activates maltose operon; MalT binds ATP and maltotriose)
