= Vibrio campbellii =

Scientific classification
- Domain: Bacteria
- Kingdom: Pseudomonadati
- Phylum: Pseudomonadota
- Class: Gammaproteobacteria
- Order: Vibrionales
- Family: Vibrionaceae
- Genus: Vibrio
- Species: V. campbellii

Binomial name
- Vibrio campbellii Baumann, Baumann, Bang and Woolkalis, 1981

Marine bacterium

Vibrio campbellii is a Gram-negative, curved rod-shaped, marine bacterium closely related to its sister species, Vibrio harveyi. Vibrio campbellii is an emerging pathogen in aquatic organisms.

== Biology ==
Quorum sensing allows the bacterium to communicate with autoinducers, a chemical signaling molecule that is secreted. Some strains of V. campellii are known to be not luminescent; these strains are thought to be less virulent than the luminescent strains. Bioluminescence in bacteria is due to the reaction:

FMNH− + H+ + RCHO + O_{2} → FMN + RCOOH + H_{2}O + hν

and is catalyzed by the enzyme luciferase. A new luciferase was isolated from V. campbellii (Lux_Vc) and is similar to that of the Lux_Vh found in V. harveyi, but is more thermodynamically stable due to the binding of reduced FMN.

The V. campbellii strains PEL22A, BAA-1116, AND4 are known to be mixotrophic or more specifically photo(organo)heterotrophic. This is considered a rare phenotype in Vibrio and is thought to be caused by their exploitation of lateral gene transfer during adaptation.

== Pathogenesis ==
The causes of virulence can vary depending on different strains. The PEL22A strain showed that the genes that regulate the bacteriophage CTXΦ, the main cause of virulence in Vibrio cholerae, were present but lack the genes for cholera toxin, ctxA and ctxB. The strain did contain hlyA gene which codes for hemolysin, an endotoxin found in most Vibrio species.
