= Life That Glows =

2016 British nature documentary programme

- Genre: Nature documentary
- Written by: Martin Dohrn
- Directed by: Joe Loncraine
- Presented by: David Attenborough
- Narrated by: David Attenborough
- Composer: Fraser Purdie
- Country of origin: United Kingdom
- Original language: English
- No. of episodes: 1

Production
- Executive producer: Ivo Filatsch
- Producer: Joe Loncraine
- Running time: 59 minutes
- Production companies: BBC Natural History Unit * BBC Worldwide * Ammonite Films * Terra Mater Factual Studios

Original release
- Network: BBC Two
- Release: 9 May – 17 July 2016

Life That Glows (also known as David Attenborough's Light on Earth) is a 2016 British nature documentary programme made for BBC Television, first shown in the UK on BBC Two on 9 May 2016. The programme is presented and narrated by Sir David Attenborough.

Life That Glows depicts the biology and ecology of bioluminescent organisms, that is, organisms capable of creating light. The programme features fireflies, who use light as a means of sexual attraction, luminous fungi, luminous marine bacteria responsible for the Milky seas effect, the flashlight fish, the aposematism of the Sierra luminous millipede, earthworms, and the bioluminescent tides created by blooms of dinoflagellates in Tasmania, as well as dolphins swimming in the bloom in the Sea of Cortez, the defensive flashes of brittle stars and ostracods, sexual attraction in ostracods, prey attraction by luminous click beetles in Cerrado, Brazil and Arachnocampa gnats in New Zealand.

The programme then introduces many luminous deep sea animals, including the vampire squid, the polychaete worm Tomopteris that generates yellow light, the jellyfish Atolla, the comb jelly Beroe, the viper fish, pyrosomes, a dragonfish, and the polychaete worm Flota. Next, the programme discusses specialised adaptations in the eyes of particular animals to see bioluminescence, such as the barreleye fish and the cock-eyed squid. Lastly, the programme features the mass spawning event of the firefly squid in Japan.
