= HTH-XRE RNA motif =

HTH-XRE
- Consensus secondary structure and sequence conservation of HTH-XRE RNA

Identifiers
- Symbol: HTH-XRE
- Rfam: RF02923

Other data
- RNA type: Cis-reg
- SO: SO:0005836
- PDB structures: PDBe

The HTH-XRE RNA motif is a conserved RNA structure that was discovered by bioinformatics. HTH-XRE motifs are found in Clostridiales.

HTH-XRE RNAs are often found upstream of genes encoding proteins with the XRE-like helix-turn-helix protein domain. However, in many cases, HTH-XRE RNAs are not upstream of a protein-coding gene. Additionally, genes encoding XRE-like domains are extremely common in bacteria, so it is possible that the association between this protein domain and the HTH-XRE RNA arises purely by coincidence. Overall, it is ambiguous whether HTH-XRE RNAs function as cis-regulatory elements or whether they operate in trans as small RNAs.
