= Competence stimulating peptide =

Competence stimulating peptides (CSP) are chemical messengers that assist the initiation of quorum sensing, and exist in many bacterial genera. Bacterial transformation of DNA is driven by CSP-coupled quorum sensing.

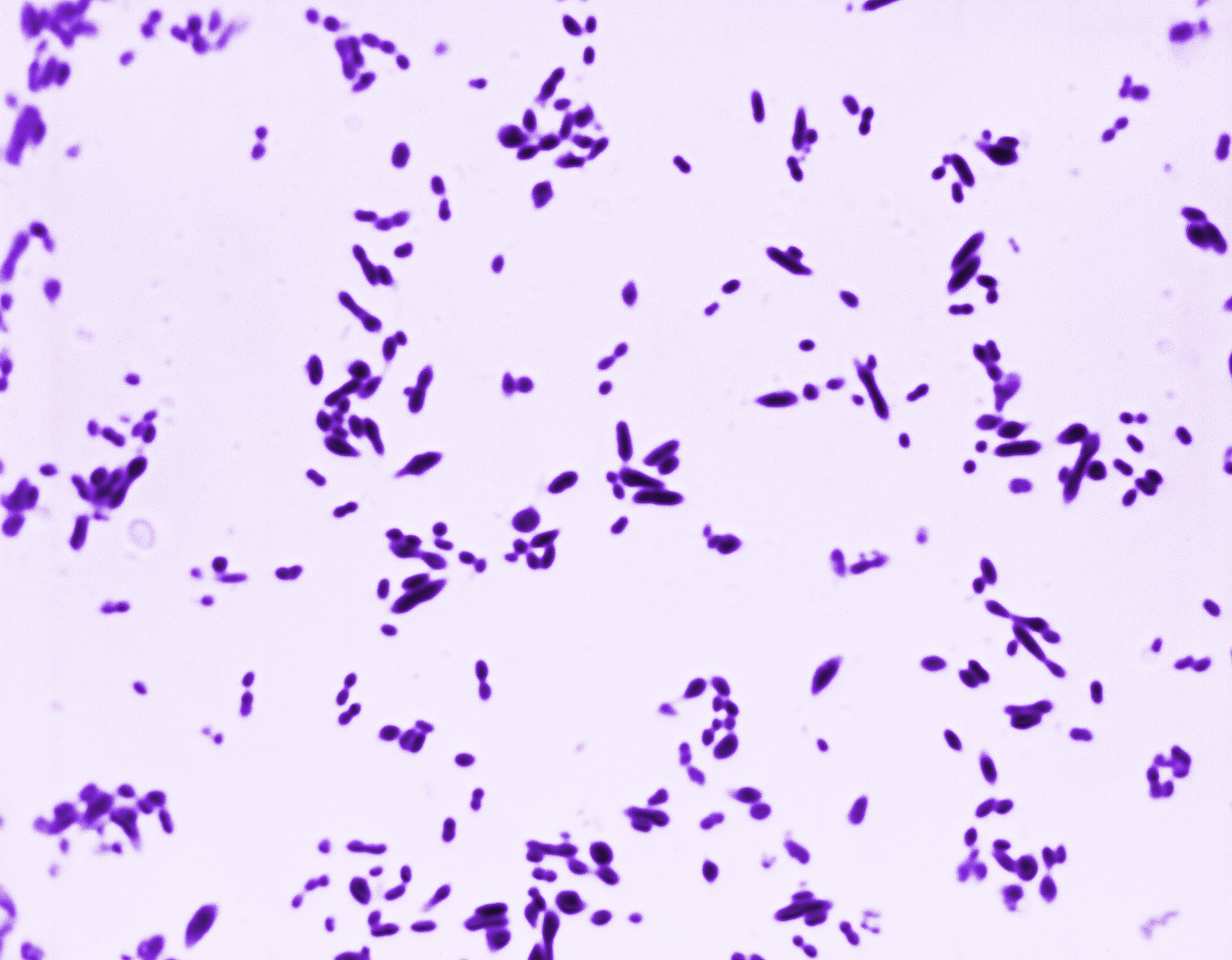
A Gram stain of the quorum-sensing Streptococcus pneumoniae. The dark purple signifies gram-positive bacteria.

Competence stimulating peptides are a subset of proteins that promote quorum sensing in numerous bacterial genera including Streptococcus and Bacillus. Quorum sensing contributes to regulation of specific gene expressions in response to cell population density fluctuations. Streptococcus pneumonia, a highly studied gram-positive bacterium, is capable of quorum sensing and can release autoinducers, chemical signals that increase as concentration based on density. CSPs are part of a unique form of regulation involved in DNA processing. The form of DNA processing starts abruptly and at the same time in all cells when in a constantly or exponentially growing culture, and then growth rapidly decreases after about 12 minutes of exponential growth.

== Background ==
Competence is the ability of bacteria to pull DNA fragments from the environment and integrate it into their chromosome. Competence stimulating peptides (CSP) are a 17-amino acid signal peptide that triggers quorum sensing, which aids competence, biofilm formation, and virulence. The propensity of S. pneumoniae to become competent is critical to the bacterium's development of antibiotic resistance.

A substantial fraction of cells in the culture of species whose appearance of competence has been studied shows that specific growth conditions (ex. growth-limiting conditions) have led to the development of competence. S. pneumoniae is unique in the sense that virtually all cells of a culture develop the ability to become competent at the same time. The density that the cells have reached during exponential growth plays a role at determining when the competency is triggered. This competency period only lasts for a short period of time, and studies indicate that this does not affect the growth rate of the culture. There are two main specificity groups that S. pneumoniae can be divided into based on the CSP signal they produce and their compatible receptors. The CSP1 signal is received by receptor ComD1 and the CSP2 signal is received by ComD2.

== Physiology and biochemistry ==
Streptococcus pneumoniae is one of the mostly highly studied bacterial species containing CSP, though other genus and species also utilize the hormone-like protein. Variations in structure, receptor specificity, and codon sequence occur even between different strains of the same species. However, homology between CSP's retain a single negatively charged N-terminus, an arginine residue in position three (C3), and a positively charged C-terminus. Signal-receptor specificity is demonstrated in Streptococcal species through the relationship between CSP1 and CSP2 signals, and the receptors ComD1 and ComD2. Variations of receptor specificity and composition can be estimated based on nuclear magnetic resonance (NMR) spectroscopy analysis.

Alterations in the structure of CSP signals, such as CSP1 and CSP2, are shown to inhibit the cellular response to these peptides, often resulting in reduced biofilm production. Replacement of the first glutamate residue in CSP1 inhibits receptor activation of competency genes, and hydrophobic regions on the CSP1 molecule play key roles in effective ComD1 and Com2 binding. Interspecies interactions between biofilm producing organisms induce the release of chemical signals that inhibit binding or receptor activation in competence stimulating processes.

Initiation of DNA transformation begins as a threshold concentration of CSP is met within a bacterial cell. Cellular density is proportional to CSP concentration. After meeting threshold concentration, transmembrane histidine kinases are activated via binding of corresponding peptides. Regulator proteins in turn are phosphorylated by the activated kinases, thereby inducing competency gene expression. Such genes produce proteins responsible for inducing DNA transformation.

== Implications in health and industry ==
Quorum sensing bacteria within the human microbiome are responsible for many diseases including sinusitis, otitis media, pneumonia, bacteraemia, osteomyelitis, septic arthritis, and meningitis. In the United States alone there is a death toll of >22,000 a year tracing back to this pathogen. S. pneumoniae uses the competence stimulating peptide and quorum sensing to initiate its attack, establish an infection, and develop antibiotic resistance genes. Overall, competence stimulating peptide allows S. pneumoniae to initiate a more pervading attack on the human host.

Currently in health and industry, studies center on explaining and intercepting the competence region within the S. pneumoniae. The goal is to limit cell–cell communication with the hopes of attenuating S. pneumoniae infectivity. Inhibiting the competence stimulating peptide shows potential as a way to combat pneumococcal infections.
