= 4,5-Dihydroxy-2,3-pentanedione =

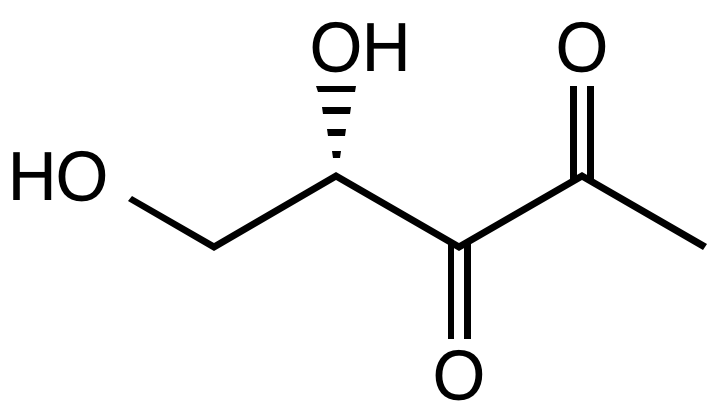

Names
- Preferred IUPAC name 4,5-Dihydroxypentane-2,3-dione
- Other names 1-Deoxypento-2,4-diulose; 1-Deoxypentosone; Dihydroxy-2,3-pentanedione; DPD

Identifiers
CAS Number	142937-55-1
3D model (JSmol)	Interactive image
ChEMBL	ChEMBL247773
ChemSpider	391652
PubChem CID	443434
UNII	KZE5WQK34F
CompTox Dashboard (EPA)	DTXSID801306744
- InChI: InChI=1S/C5H8O4/c1-3(7)5(9)4(8)2-6/h4,6,8H,2H2,1H3 Key: UYTRITJAZOPLCZ-UHFFFAOYSA-N
- SMILES: CC(=O)C(=O)C(CO)O

Properties
Chemical formula	C_{5}H_{8}O_{4}
Molar mass	132.115 g·mol^{−1}
Appearance	Colorless
- Except where otherwise noted, data are given for materials in their standard state (at 25 °C [77 °F], 100 kPa). Infobox references

4,5-Dihydroxy-2,3-pentanedione (DPD) is an organic compound that occurs naturally but exists as several related structures. The idealized formula for this species is CH_{3}C(O)C(O)CH(OH)CH_{2}OH, but it is known to exist as several other forms resulting from cyclization. It is not stable at room temperature as a pure material, which has further complicated its analysis. The (S)-stereoisomer occurs naturally. It is typically hydrated, i.e., one keto group has added water to give the geminal diol.

DPD is produced by degradation of S-adenosylhomocysteine by the action of the enzyme S-ribosylhomocysteinase. The compound probably does not exist as depicted above, but as an equilibrium mixture of three hydrates.

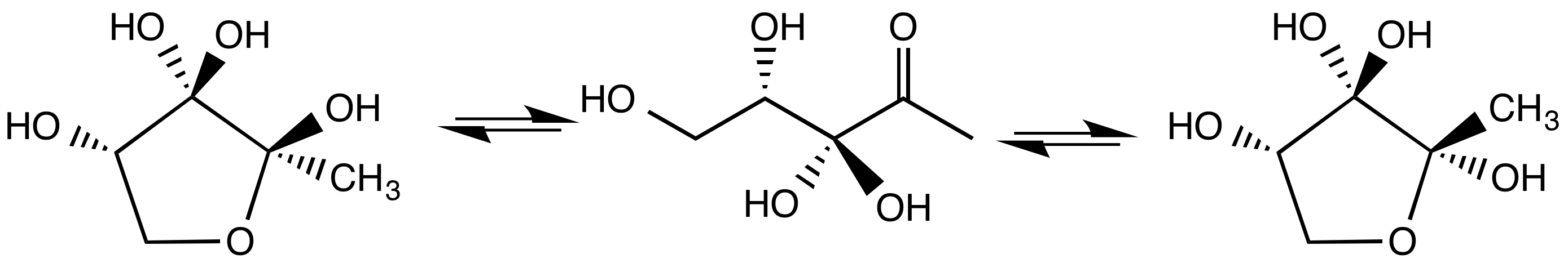
Hydrated derivatives of dihydroxypentanedione.

DPD reacts with boric acid to form a borate diester known as autoinducer-2 (AI-2). AI-2 is a signaling molecule used for bacterial quorum sensing. It is produced and recognized by many Gram-negative and Gram-positive bacteria. AI-2 is synthesized by the reaction of DPD with boric acid and is recognized by the two-component sensor kinase LuxPQ in Vibrionaceae.
