= S-ribosylhomocysteine lyase =

Identifiers
- EC no.: 4.4.1.21
- CAS no.: 37288-63-4

Databases
- IntEnz: IntEnz view
- BRENDA: BRENDA entry
- ExPASy: NiceZyme view
- KEGG: KEGG entry
- MetaCyc: metabolic pathway
- PRIAM: profile
- PDB structures: RCSB PDB PDBe PDBsum
- Gene Ontology: AmiGO / QuickGO
Search
- PMC: articles
- PubMed: articles
- NCBI: proteins

S-Ribosylhomocysteinase (LuxS)
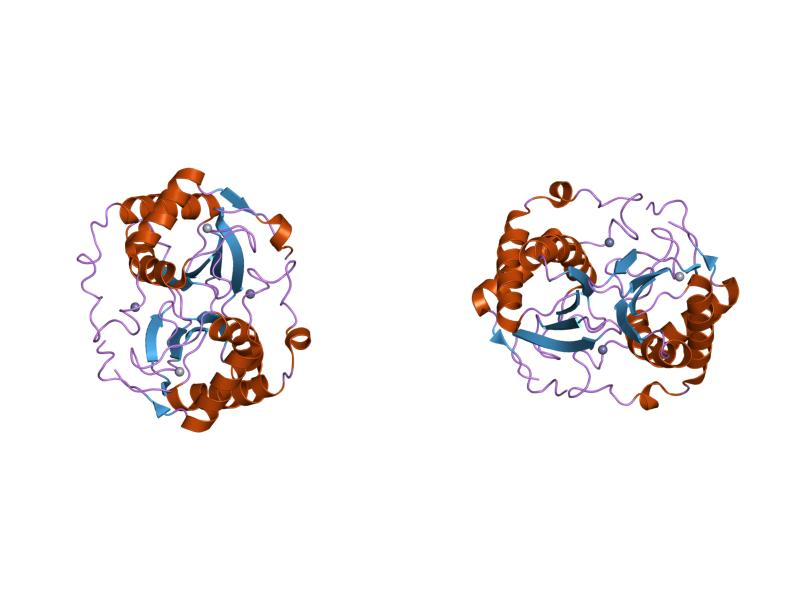
- crystal structure of autoinducer-2 production protein (luxs) from Haemophilus influenzae

Identifiers
- Symbol: LuxS
- Pfam: PF02664
- Pfam clan: CL0094
- InterPro: IPR003815
- SCOP2: 1inn / SCOPe / SUPFAM
Available protein structures:
- Pfam: structures / ECOD
- PDB: RCSB PDB; PDBe; PDBj
- PDBsum: structure summary

The enzyme S-ribosylhomocysteine lyase (EC 4.4.1.21) catalyzes the reaction

S-(5-deoxy-D-ribos-5-yl)-L-homocysteine = L-homocysteine + (4S)-4,5-dihydroxypentan-2,3-dione

== Nomenclature ==
This enzyme belongs to the family of lyases, specifically the class of carbon-sulfur lyases. The systematic name of this enzyme class is S-(5-deoxy-D-ribos-5-yl)-L-homocysteine L-homocysteine-lyase [(4S)-4,5-dihydroxypentan-2,3-dione-forming]. Other names in common use include S-ribosylhomocysteinase, and LuxS. This enzyme participates in methionine metabolism.

== Structure and function ==
LuxS is a homodimeric iron-dependent metalloenzyme containing two identical tetrahedral metal-binding sites similar to those found in peptidases and amidases. Furthermore, LuxS is involved in the synthesis of autoinducer AI-2 (autoinducer-2), which mediates quorum sensing in roughly half of bacterial species. AI-2, a furanosyl borate diester, is a small signaling molecule generated by bacteria. LuxS converts S-ribosylhomocysteine to homocysteine and 4,5-dihydroxy-2,3-pentanedione (DPD); DPD can then spontaneously cyclisize to active AI-2. AI-2 is a signalling molecule that is believed to act in cross-species communication by regulating niche-specific genes with diverse functions, such as toxin production, biofilm formation, sporulation, and virulence gene expression, in various bacteria, often in response to population density. The AI-2 formation pathway begins with S-adenosyl-L-homocysteine (AdoHcy), which is hydrolyzed to S-adenosyl-L-homocysteine (SRH) and adenine by S-adenosyl-L-homocysteine/5’-methylthioadenosine nucleosidase (SAHN or MTAN, EC 3.2.2.9) (8-10). LuxS cleaves S-ribosyl-homocysteine to form L-homocysteine (Hcy) and 4,5-dihydroxy-2,3-pentanedione (DPD), which can then spontaneously cyclisize to active AI-2 (11-15). An unequivocally AI-2 related behavior was found to be restricted primarily to bacteria bearing known AI-2 receptor genes. Thus, while it is certainly true that some bacteria can respond to AI-2, it is doubtful that it is always being produced for purposes of signaling.

== Clinical significance ==
LuxS influences iron uptake in pneumococcal species, which also affects biofilm formation. LuxS mutant D39luxS has reduced virulence when compared to wild type studies done on the intranasal channels of mice, and experiments have shown that this mutant also has significantly decreased biofilm formation capabilities.
