= Diffusible signal factor =

Diffusible signal factor (DSF) is found in several gram-negative bacteria and play a role in the formation of biofilms, motility, virulence, and antibiotic resistance. Xanthomonas campestris was the first bacteria known to have DSF. The synthesis of the DSF can be seen in RpfF and RpfB enzymes. An understanding of the DSF signaling mechanism could lead to further disease control.

== Function ==
Diffusible signal factor has been found to contribute to four major biological functions within certain species of bacteria. It is important in regulation of motility, virulence factor, antibiotic resistance, and most importantly biofilm formation. Bacteria are capable of forming a polymicrobial community in which they share resources and protect themselves from harm, this is known as a biofilm. Bacteria use diffusible signal factor to tell interspecies around them that a biofilm is beginning to form and begin synthesizing virulence factors. Diffusible signal factor uses quorum sensing to share information between interspecies as well as inter-kingdom species. Such example of inter-kingdom species are found when P. aeruginosa uses DSF to disperse its own biofilm as well as other species, such as Escherichia coli, Klebsiella pneumoniae, Proteus mirabilis, Streptococcus pyogenes, Bacillus subtilis, Staphylococcus aureus, and the yeast Candida albicans.

It is also found that DSF makes different species have a higher virulence when it is shared. This is found when Burkholderia cenocepacia and Stenotrophomonas maltophilia's diffusible signal factor is received by Pseudomonas aeruginosa which makes the bacteria more resistant to antibiotics in cystic fibrous airways. However, not all diffusible signal factors interaction are beneficial to bacteria. When gram positive bacteria, such as Bacillus species, receives diffusible signal factor from gram positive bacteria this can stop the endospore vegetation transition and cause the bacteria to die. Shared diffusible signal factor can also cause other species to become susceptible to antibiotics.

DSFs are a cis-unsaturated fatty acid. DSFs can also function through genes by activating or repressing gene expression in target cells. When a diffusible signaling factor binds to its receptor it can initiate a signaling cascade that ultimately leads to the activation of transcription factors. In X. campestris pv. campestris, which are found in xanthomonads, genes regulating enzyme syntheses was first discovered and used to further identify the functions of RpfF, RpfC, and RpfG. These factors can then promote or inhibit the expression of specific genes, depending on the nature of the signaling pathway and the cellular context.
