= Helix-turn-helix =

Structural motif capable of binding DNA

Identifiers
- Symbol: HTH
- Pfam clan: CL0123
- ECOD: 101.1

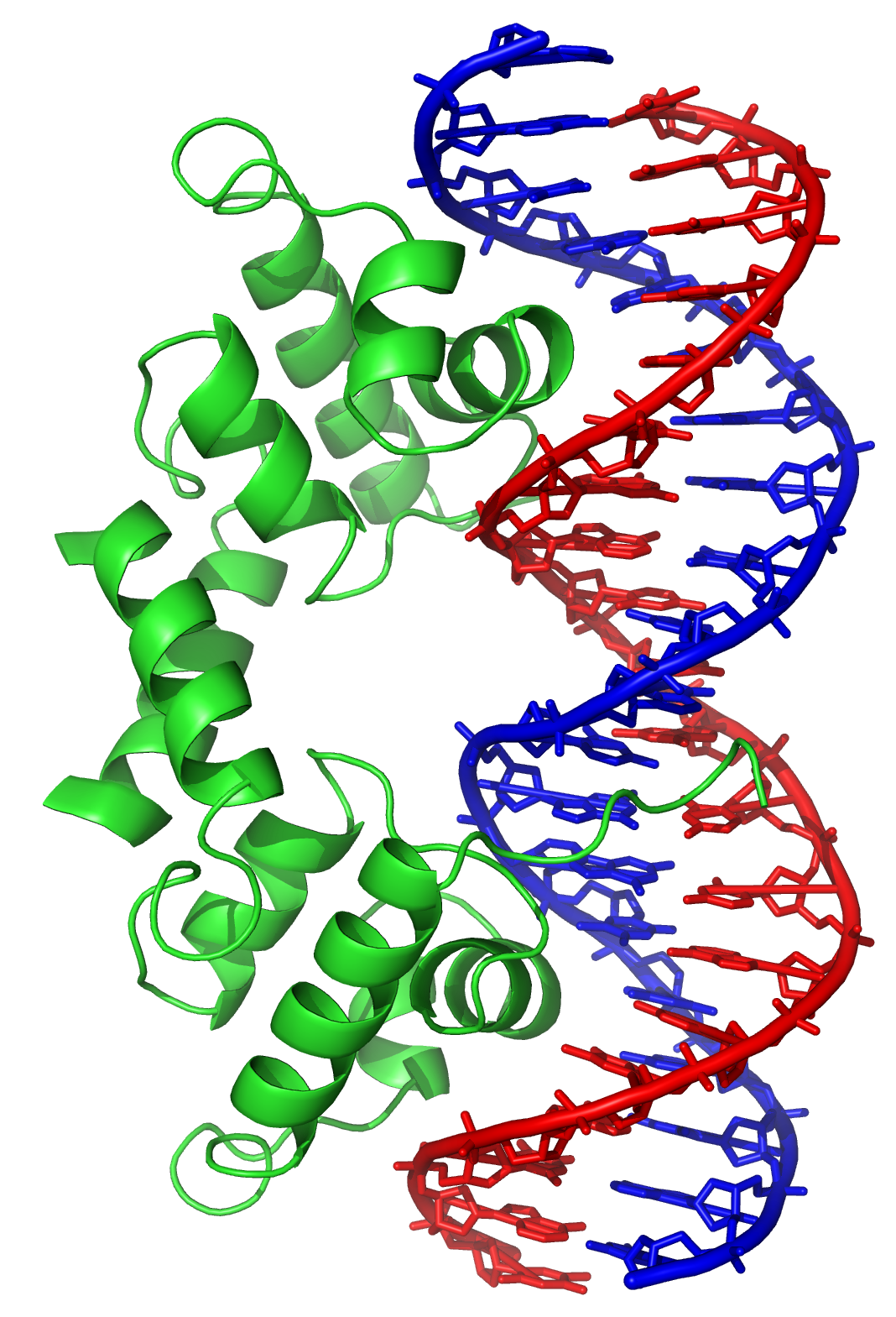
The λ repressor of bacteriophage lambda employs two helix-turn-helix motifs (left; green) to bind DNA (right; blue and red). The λ repressor protein in this image is a dimer.

The helix-turn-helix (HTH) is a major structural motif in proteins that functions as a DNA-binding domain (DBD). Each monomer incorporates two α helices, joined by a short strand of amino acids, that bind to the major groove of DNA. The HTH motif occurs in many proteins that regulate gene expression. It should not be confused with the helix–loop–helix motif.

== Discovery ==
The discovery of the helix-turn-helix motif was based on similarities between several genes encoding transcription regulatory proteins from bacteriophage lambda and Escherichia coli: Cro, CAP, and λ repressor, which were found to share a common 20–25 amino acid sequence that facilitates DNA recognition.

== Function ==
The helix-turn-helix motif is a DNA-binding motif. The recognition and binding to DNA by helix-turn-helix proteins is done by the two α helices, one occupying the N-terminal end of the motif, the other at the C-terminus. In most cases, such as in the Cro repressor, the second helix contributes most to DNA recognition, and hence it is often called the "recognition helix". It binds to the major groove of DNA through a series of hydrogen bonds and various Van der Waals interactions with exposed bases. The other α helix stabilizes the interaction between protein and DNA, but does not play a particularly strong role in its recognition. The recognition helix and its preceding helix always have the same relative orientation.

== Classification of helix-turn-helix motifs ==
Several attempts have been made to classify the helix-turn-helix motifs based on their structure and the spatial arrangement of their helices. Some of the main types are described below.

=== Di-helical ===
The di-helical helix-turn-helix motif is the simplest helix-turn-helix motif. A fragment of Engrailed homeodomain encompassing only the two helices and the turn was found to be an ultrafast independently folding protein domain.

=== Tri-helical ===
An example of this motif is found in the transcriptional activator Myb.

=== Tetra-helical ===
The tetra-helical helix-turn-helix motif has an additional C-terminal helix compared to the tri-helical motifs. These include the LuxR-type DNA-binding HTH domain found in bacterial transcription factors and the helix-turn-helix motif found in the TetR repressors. Multihelical versions with additional helices also occur.

=== Winged helix-turn-helix ===
The winged helix-turn-helix (wHTH) motif is formed by a 3-helical bundle and a 3- or 4-strand beta-sheet (wing). The topology of helices and strands in the wHTH motifs may vary. In the transcription factor ETS wHTH folds into a helix-turn-helix motif on a four-stranded anti-parallel beta-sheet scaffold arranged in the order α1-β1-β2-α2-α3-β3-β4 where the third helix is the DNA recognition helix.

=== Other modified helix-turn-helix motifs ===
Other derivatives of the helix-turn-helix motif include the DNA-binding domain found in MarR, a regulator of multiple antibiotic resistance, which forms a winged helix-turn-helix with an additional C-terminal alpha helix.

== See also ==
- DNA-binding domain
- DNA-binding protein
- Secondary structure
- Zinc finger
