= Milky seas effect =

Luminous phenomenon in the ocean

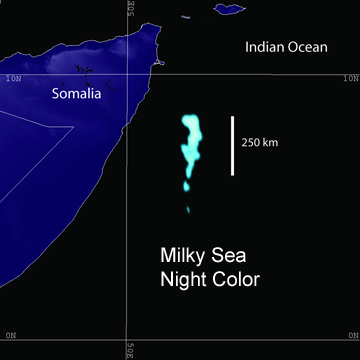
Milky sea effect off the coast of Somalia in the Indian Ocean

Milky seas, sometimes confused with mareel, are a luminous phenomenon in the ocean in which large areas of seawater (up to 100,000 km^{2} or 39,000 mi^{2}) appear to glow diffusely and continuously (in varying shades of blue). Such occurrences glow brightly enough at night to be visible from satellites orbiting Earth. Unlike flashing waves or red-tide luminescence caused by algae such as dinoflagellates, milky seas originate from luminous bacteria.

Mariners and other seafarers have reported that the ocean often emits a visible glow which extends for miles at night. In 2005, scientists announced that for the first time, they had obtained photographic evidence of this glow. In a follow-up study, they observed a glow that persisted for over 40 days.

== Etymology ==
Milky seas are named for the diffuse appearance of the light, since the individual bacteria are too small to make discernible flashes. In the novel Twenty Thousand Leagues Under the Seas, Jules Verne describes the ship as "sailing through a sea of milk."

In the Somali language it is called kaluunka iftiima. The term translates to glowing sea creatures or glowing fish as the word kaluun refers to any bio organism that lives in the sea. It is most commonly used to refer to fish.

Dutch sailors referred to milky seas as the winter sea due to how similar the phenomena looks to a snowy plain at night. Other accounts of milky seas in Dutch refer to the phenomenon as a melkzee which translates to "milky sea."

== Effect ==
Between 1915 and 1993, 235 sightings of milky seas were documented, most of which are concentrated in the northwestern Indian Ocean near to Somalia. The luminescent glow is concentrated on the surface of the ocean and does not mix evenly throughout the water column.

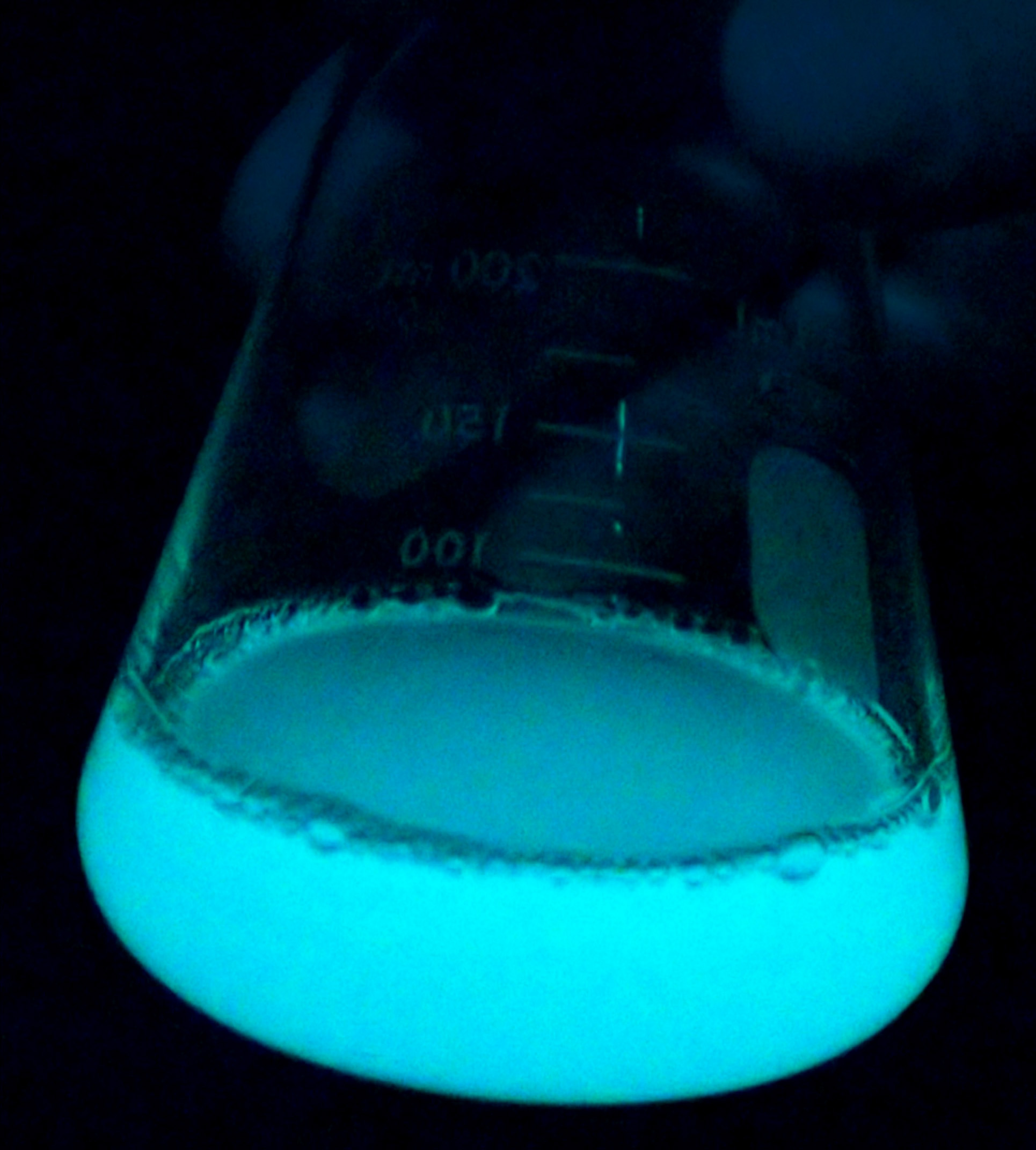
A culture of luminous bacteria, showing the diffuse uniform light that characterizes milky seas.

In 1985, a research vessel in the Arabian Sea took water samples during milky seas. Their conclusions were that the effect was caused by the bacterium Vibrio harveyi. In 2005, Steven Miller was able to match 1995 satellite images with a first-hand account of a merchant ship. U.S. Defense Meteorological Satellite Program showed the milky area to be approximately 15,400 km^{2} (5,900 mi^{2})—roughly the size of Connecticut. The luminescent field was observed to glow over three consecutive nights. In a later study using a newer Day-Night Band sensor, the team was able to observe several additional events, including one from 2019 which covered 100,000 km^{2} (39,000 mi^{2}) and persisted for over 40 nights.

While monochromatic photos make this effect appear white, Monterey Bay Aquarium Research Institute scientist Steven Haddock (an author of a milky seas effect study) has commented, "the light produced by the bacteria is actually blue, not white. It is white in the graphic because of the monochromatic sensor we used, and it can appear white to the eye because the rods in our eye (used for night vision) don't discriminate color."

Milky seas are a different phenomenon than "mareel," which is a term used for dinoflagellate-produced bioluminescent displays in Scotland. Dinoflagellates produce impressive bioluminescent bays, and they are responsible for the light visible in breaking waves, or glowing footprints on the beach. However, the two types of large-scale displays can be distinguished because the bacteria that produce milky seas glow continuously when they are at high concentrations and have sufficient oxygen whereas dinoflagellates flash when physically stimulated.

== History ==
English accounts of milky seas begin appearing not long after the formation of the East India Company. The journal of Captain William Keeling records an encounter with a milky sea near Cape Guardafui.

One of the earliest scientific works on milky seas was read by Captain Newland before the Royal Society in 1772. Captain Newland speculated that milky seas may be caused by an unknown animalcule, an archaic word for microscopic organism.

Scientific research into milky seas continued through the 19th and 20th centuries with researchers identifying that milky seas tend to occur in the Indian Ocean during the Monsoon of South Asia near Somalia, the island of Java in Indonesia, and in the Banda Sea. Descriptions of milky seas from the 1800s detail the phenomena being visible from the coasts of islands in the Banda Sea.

In the late 1800s Bernhard Fischer surmised based on his experiments that milky seas were likely caused by bioluminescent bacteria living in the ocean. A chance encounter between a research vessel and a milky sea in 1985 identified bioluminescent bacteria within the waters of a milky sea.

In the 21st century researchers showed that low-light imagers aboard satellites can view milky seas from space. Observed milky seas reaching sizes on the order of 100,000 km^{2} (39,000 sq mi) and potentially sustaining themselves for months at a time. Recent work has noted a potential connection between milky seas and the Indian Ocean Dipole.
