= N-Acyl homoserine lactone =

Class of chemical compounds

General chemical structure of an N-acyl homoserine lactone

N-Acyl homoserine lactones (Abbreviated as AHLs or N-AHLs) are a class of signaling molecules involved in bacterial quorum sensing, a means of communication between bacteria enabling behaviors based on population density.

The first AHL (N-3-(oxo-hexanoyl)-homoserine lactone) was found as the natural inducer of bioluminescence in the bacterium Vibrio fischeri. Quorum sensing by the means of AHLs contributes to regulate the transcription of specific genes and therefore expression of specific phenotypes, including growth, virulence, biofilm formation, bioluminescence, production of exopolysaccharide (EPS). Over 50 gram-negative bacteria species (including several pathogenic species) use AHLs as autoinducers and the means of their communication in quorum sensing. In one study, AHL was shown to interact with eukaryotic cells, and mitigate an immune response and facilitates infection. AHLs are one of the major groups of the autoinducer (AI) molecules which are found primarily in gram-negative proteobacteria but also in some Bacteroidetes, Cyanobacteria, and archaea. The other two major groups are oligopeptides AIs in gram-positive bacteria; and autoinducer-2 (AI-2), as a universal signal for interspecies communications.

== Formation ==
It arises by the reaction of acyl carrier proteins react with S-adenosylmethionine. The latter donates the equivalent of α-amino-γ-butyrolactone. Methylthioadenosine is a coproduct.

Homoserine lactones are also a product of the proteolytic reaction of cyanogen bromide (CNBr) with a methionine residue. This reaction is important for chemical sequencing of proteins.

=== Structure ===
AHLs have hydrophobic and hydrophilic sections. The hydrophilic section consists of the homoserine lactone ring and the amide group. The hydrophobic section has a strain-specific hydrocarbon chain with varieties in length and level of oxygenation with a 3-oxo group. The length of the acyl chain generally ranges from 4 to 18 carbons. The length of R-group side-chain variable. Chain lengths vary from 4 to 18 carbon atoms and in the substitution of a carbonyl at the third carbon. The hydrophilic sections form a hydrogen bonded network within the receptor binding site, while the hydrophobic sites contribute to diffusional and binding properties within the hydrophobic pocket. Studies have not yet demonstrated a correlation between the AHL synthase enzymes and AHL type. LuxI protein synthesizes an acylated homoserin-lactone molecule. The LuxI gene is highly conserved, which indicates that although diverse, there are a limited number of AHL-type signals that are produced by bacteria. However, in the AHL synthase enzyme family, the C-terminal region, which determines the type of substrates the synthetase can recognize and the subsequent acyl-chain length, is not conserved. Moreover, there is no evidence as of now that the distribution of AHL synthase and the species are correlated. Contrary to LuxI genes, the receptors of AHLs, LuxR protein and their genes, are highly variable among species.

== Signalling ==
=== Mechanism ===
Bacterial quorum signaling begins with N-AHL secretion into the environment.

In the process of quorum sensing, first the LuxI protein synthesizes an acylated homoserine lactone molecule which can pass through cell membrane along the gradient through diffusion to the environmental space. When the concentration of these autoinducers in the environment is lower than inside the cell, they will move down the gradient and will leave the cell, therefore, they will not attach to their receptor, LuxR, which is in the cytoplasm. When the population of bacteria reaches a threshold, and the concentration of the autoinducers in the environment is higher than inside the cell, they will move along the gradient into the cell and will attach to the receptor. Thus, the LuxR-AHL complex will be formed. This complex will bind to a 20 base pair (bp) section of DNA, called the lux box. This region is in or near the lux promoter region, which is located ~40 bp upstream of the regulated gene. Because LuxR is bound to the promoter, RNA polymerase is recruited to this promoter region and the gene expression is induced. Moreover, the LuxR-AHL complex will upregulate luxI transcription, which will increase the production of AHLs (positive feedback loop). The transcription of the target genes will be regulated, as gene expression of the microbial population will be coordinated. Several studies have been investigating on the potential AHLs effective in infection and resistance to antibiotics. The LuxR–LuxI system mediated by AHLs is the best screened QS system in multi-drug resistant bacteria species.

=== Quorum Quenching ===
As opposed to quorum sensing, quorum quenching, prevents bacterial communication and influences their gene expression. Targets of the quorum quenching are the signal molecules, the biosynthetic machinery of signal molecules, and the regulatory proteins that perceive these signal molecules with the AHL degradation via AHL degrading enzymes and limiting signal accumulation being the main mechanism. The AHLs are degraded by enzymes through three mechanisms: lactone hydrolysis, amide bond hydrolysis, and acyl chain modification. Lactone hydrolysis occurs when AHL lactonase hydrolyzes homoserine lactone rings. This process was first observed in Bacillus species. AHL acylases catalyze the complete and irreversible destruction of AHLs through the hydrolysis of amide bonds. AHL oxidase and reductase, first discovered in Rhodococcus erythropolis, catalyze a change in the chemical structure of signals, which affects AHL signal recognition and interferes with quorum sensing regulated processes. The second AHLase is a Bacillus megaterium P450 monooxygenase that oxidizes fatty acids and N-fatty acyl amino acids. Lactonases and acylases are the two pioneers of quorum quenching mechanisms. Lactonases break down the lactone bonds in autoinducers, making them unable to bind to target transcriptional regulators and thereby increasing disease resistance.

=== Impacts of AHLs on Plants ===
Plants have a critical role in shaping our world and their relationship with microorganisms is of significant importance. Over the long history of coevolution of plants and microbes, plants have evolved to respond to the symbiotic or pathogenic microbes in appropriate ways with an adapted gene expression profile such as cooperation with bacterial saprotrophs leading to an endophytic life or defense responses against pathogens. AHLs play an important role in the symbiosis of rhizobium and legumes which will result in the formation of nodules. Experiments have reported that application of AHLs activates the auxin-responsible GH3 promoter (upregulate auxin-related genes), and down-regulates the genes related to cytokinin (the change in the ratio between auxin and cytokinin can promote growth). Also, followed by applying AHL, the nodulation in roots has been enhanced. Moreover, the water and mineral flow through the plant was higher as stomata opening increased, and therefore the overall transpiration rate changed. Aside from AHL-mediated bacteria-plant beneficial interactions, QS-signaling AHL compounds were shown to function as important communication signal in tripartite symbiotic bacteria-fungus-plant interactions. The endophytic bacterium with AHL-autoinduction and produces a variety of long side-chain AHLs seems to assist the fungus to interact in a symbiotic manner with the colonized host plants. The fungus Serendipita indica, which was isolated from the rhizosphere of plants, is associated with stress tolerance and plant growth promotion. It was shown that this fungus harbors an endofungal bacterium, Rhizobium radiobacter F4, which genes of AHL-autoinduction. When R. radiobacter F4 was inoculated to Arabidopsis or wheat (Triticum aestivum), it conferred similar stimulation of growth and yield, as well as priming of the defense responses and increasing environmental fitness. Interestingly, when the AHL-compounds were depleted, root colonization, growth promotion and resistance-inducing activities diminished. These findings suggest that whenever the fungus S. indica is applied to support growth vigor of diverse plants, the endofungal AHL-producing R. radiobacter are colonizing the host plant and participate to steer the coordination of microbe-plant interaction.

=== AHLs and Nitrogen Cycle ===
Microbes are a key player in charge of the fate of nitrogen in soil and water. AHL-mediated quorum sensing has an important role in the nitrogen cycle. All nitrifying bacteria and some denitrifying bacteria use AHL as their signal molecules. AHLs influence the efficiency of and regulate the functions involved in nitrification and denitrification. Some bacterial species of ammonia-oxidizing bacteria, like Nitrosomonas europaea, Nitrosospira multiformis, Nitrosospira briensis, use C6- to C14- AHLs. Nitrite-oxidizing bacteria (NOB), such as Nitrobacter winogradskyi, Nitrobacter vulgaris, and Nitrospira moscoviensis, also use C8- or C10- AHLs. Candidatus Jettenia caeni with anaerobic ammonium oxidation (annamox) mode uses C6- and C8- AHLs. Moreover, Pseudomonas aeruginosa and Paracoccus denitrificans as denitrifying bacteria also use C4-HSL and C16-AHL, respectively. In some of the nitrifying and denitrifying bacteria like Nitrobacter hamburgensis AHLs were not found although putative AHL synthetase and receptor proteins were.

== See also ==
- Lactonase
