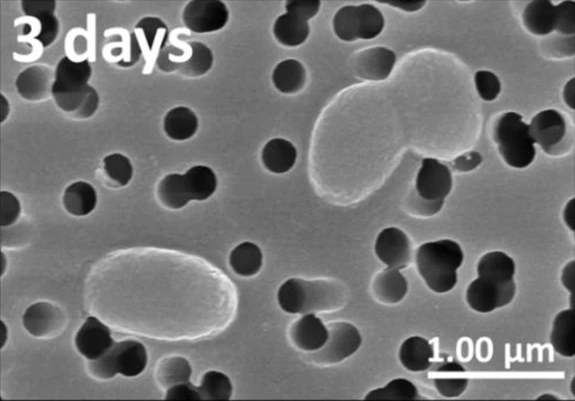

Scientific classification
- Domain: Bacteria
- Kingdom: Pseudomonadati
- Phylum: Pseudomonadota
- Class: Gammaproteobacteria
- Order: Vibrionales
- Family: Vibrionaceae
- Genus: Vibrio
- Species: V. harveyi

Binomial name
- Vibrio harveyi Johnson and Shunk 1936; Baumann et al. 1981

Synonyms
- Beneckea harveyi (Johnson and Shunk 1936) Reichelt and Baumann 1973; Achromobacter harveyi Johnson and Shunk 1936; Pseudomonas harveyi (Johnson and Shunk 1936) Breed 1948; Photobacterium harveyi (Johnson and Shunk 1936) Breed and Lessel 1954; Lucibacterium harveyi (Johnson and Shunk 1936) Hendrie et al. 1970; Vibrio carchariae Grimes et al. 1985; Vibrio trachuri Iwamoto et al. 1996

= Vibrio harveyi =

Species of bacterium

Vibrio harveyi is a Gram-negative, bioluminescent, marine bacterium in the genus Vibrio that was first discovered by Johnson and Shunk in their 1963 publication "An interesting new species of luminous bacteria". V. harveyi is rod-shaped, motile (via polar flagella), facultatively anaerobic, halophilic, and competent for both fermentative and respiratory metabolism. It is typically found in aquatic ecosystems — particularly in warmer tropical waters (optimum growth: 30° to 35 °C) — as a free-living bacterium. However, V. harveyi can also live commensally with other marine life, form biofilms on marine surfaces, and act as a pathogen in organisms like coral and oysters. This bacterium is tolerant to fluxes in environmental conditions, a characteristic attributed to its rapid adaptation caused by mutations and Horizontal Gene Transfer. This tolerance allows V. harveyi to thrive in environments affected by climate change.

Certain strains of V. harveyi can cause disease in marine life, such as luminous vibriosis — a disease that causes commercially farmed penaeid prawns to glow in the dark. The pathogenicity of these strains can be enhanced in environments affected by climate change, primarily due to the weakening of marine hosts. Despite its harmful effects, V. harveyi plays a beneficial role in nutrient cycling by using chitin — a building block of marine invertebrate exoskeletons — as a carbon source. It does so by breaking chitin down into simpler molecules that are used and eventually returned to the aquatic system to be taken up by other organisms. This species is also thought to be the cause of the milky seas effect, in which, a uniform blue glow is emitted from seawater during the night. Some glows can cover nearly 6,000 sq mi (16,000 km²).

== Genome & taxonomy ==
=== Phylogeny ===
==== Taxonomy classification ====
Vibrio harveyi belongs to the bacterial kingdom under the Pseudomonadota phylum and is classed as a Gammaproteobacteria. More specifically, it belongs to the Vibrionaceae family and therefore the Vibrio genus. It also belongs to the Harveyi clade alongside Vibrio campbellii, Vibrio natriegens, Vibrio alginolyticus, and Vibrio parahaemolyticus.

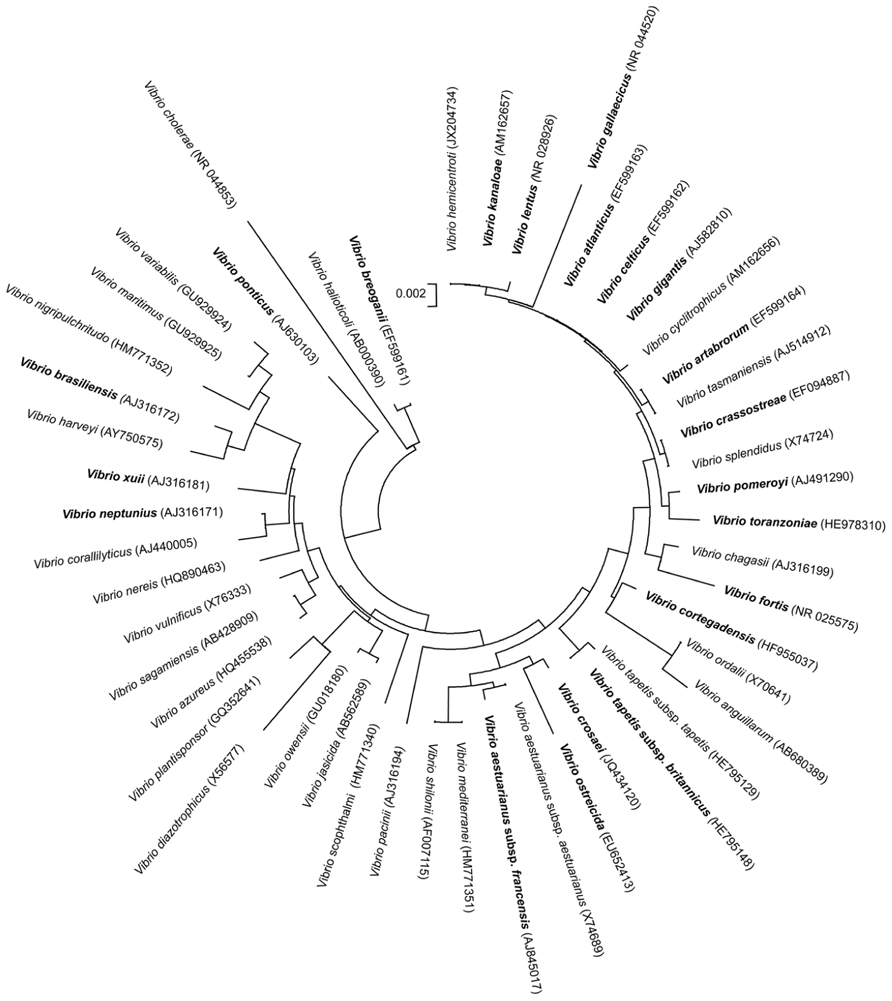
Phylogenetic tree of the genus Vibrio

==== Relations to other Vibrio species ====
Although closely related to V. campbellii — with a DNA similarity of 61% to 74% — V. harveyi has also been found to contain similar genes to other bacteria outside its clade such as Vibrio cholerae, specifically thought to have occurred through Horizontal Gene Transfer. This was hypothesized after ToxR, a regulator for the cholera toxin gene, was found to exist within all Vibrio species within the Harveyi clade.

=== Genome structure ===
The genomes of five different strains of V. harveyi — ATCC 33843, FDAARGOS_107, QT520, WXL345, and WXL538 — were sequences and analyzed, finding the following information:

==== Genome size ====
The genome size of the five different strains of V. harveyi ranges from 5.88 to 6.18 Mb in length.

==== G-C bases in DNA ====
Out of all the DNA sequenced in the five different strains of V. harveyi, the percent of G-C bases was found to be anywhere from 44.75% to 45.05%.

==== Large circular chromosome (Chr1) ====
This chromosome contains the genes that encode for cellular components that handle the maintenance of everyday functions, such as ribosomal proteins.

==== Small circular chromosome (Chr2) ====
This chromosome contains the genes that encode for more specialized functions such as antibiotic resistance, pathogenicity, and adaptation.

=== Plasmids ===
Several V. harveyi isolates were analyzed with long-read sequencing resulting in the identification of different kinds of plasmids existing within the isolates.

==== Plasmid use ====
Structure of Plasmids as Circular DNA, separate from the Bacteria's DNA

These plasmids act as storage for important genes V. harveyi can use to increase its pathogenicity, antibiotic-resistance, and adaptation. They also play a major role in Horizontal Gene Transfer, meaning that individuals of a strain are able to transfer genes and gain genes from individuals of another strain, by a process called conjugation. This exchange of traits from other bacteria allows V. harveyi to adapt rapidly as it does not have to solely wait for evolution or mutation to gain access to new traits like many other species.

==== Discovered effects of plasmids in V. harveyi ====
Two isolates of V. harveyi — Vh-14 and Vh-15 — were discovered to be completely (100%) lethal towards Barramundi fish due to the unique characteristics of their plasmids. Both strains possessed a large conjugative plasmid made up of ~105,412 base pairs that was found to carry major virulence genes such as Type III Secretion System genes. The lethality of these isolates is in part due to the size of their plasmids. The size allowed them to carry more genes specialized in pathogenicity, effectively increasing the pathogenic capabilities of the isolates.

== Virulence factors & pathogenicity ==
=== Virulence factors ===
==== Exotoxins ====
V. harveyi is able to produce a variety of exotoxins that can degrade host tissues and fluids, especially during the exponential growth phase of the bacteria. Some of these exotoxins include lipases, phospholipases, and hemolysins. V. harveyi also produces several types of proteases which break down peptides within the host. There is one cysteine protease that is the main driver of lethality in giant tiger prawns as it prevents the prawns' hemolymph from clotting.

Several types of chitinase enzymes like chitobiase are also produced by V. harveyi in order to expose host crustaceans to further degradation. V. harveyi that has grown on chitin will typically express more chitinase enzymes. The composition of the chitin subunits itself will influence the type of chitinases expressed as well.

==== Iron acquisition ====
V. harveyi is able to acquire iron by producing iron chelating agents and they are mostly used to acquire iron from the bodily fluids of vertebrate hosts. Specific strains of V. harveyi has also been noted to have iron transport proteins sitA, sitB, sitC, and sitD which have not been previously seen in any other Vibrio species.

==== Adherence ====
Strains of V. harveyi have been documented to have different pili genes such as, mshB and pilA. These pili are used to adhere to surfaces on hosts that might otherwise be difficult to attach to, like mucosa.

==== Biofilm formation ====
LuxR is a gene found in V. harveyi that plays a role in quorum sensing. This can allow V. harveyi to form biofilms that are resistant to certain antimicrobial compounds and coordinate the activation of virulence genes once enough bacteria have been established in the host organism.

=== Antimicrobial Resistance ===
Various strains of V. harveyi isolated from European sea bass have been shown to be resistant to the same anti-microbial compounds. This includes complete resistance against ampicillin, mild to complete resistance against novobiocin, and complete resistance against the compound O129 to which the genus Vibrio is typically susceptible. Conversely, the same strains of V. harveyi were susceptible to certain antibiotics including ceftazimide, chloramphenicol, enrofloxacin, florfenicol, gentamicin, meropenem, oxolinic acid, oxytetracycline, and sulfamethoxazol. Resistance and susceptibility tend to vary amongst strains since a strain of V. harveyi which causes disease in giant tiger prawns is resistant to chloramphenicol unlike the previous strains.

=== Endosymbiotic Relationships ===
Rarely, V. harveyi can be found within the cytoplasm of the parasitic protozoan Cryptocaryon irritans. Research has suggested that some V. harveyi infections in fish may be the result of an initial C. irritans infection, although the exact nature of the relationship between the two organisms is unclear. It has been hypothesized that V. harveyi might be beneficial to C. irritans by either improving C. irritans pathogenicity or by dysregulating the immune response of the host organism.

== Quorum sensing ==
Groups of V. harveyi bacteria communicate by quorum sensing to coordinate the production of bioluminescence and virulence factors. Quorum sensing was first studied in V. fischeri (now Aliivibrio fischeri), a marine bacterium that uses a synthase (LuxI) to produce a species-specific autoinducer (AI) that binds a cognate receptor (LuxR) that regulates changes in expression. Coined "LuxI/R" quorum sensing, these systems have been identified in many other species of Gram-negative bacteria. Despite its relatedness to A. fischeri, V. harveyi lacks a LuxI/R quorum-sensing system, and instead employs a hybrid quorum-sensing circuit, detecting its AI through a membrane-bound histidine kinase and using a phosphorelay to convert information about the population size to changes in gene expression. Since their identification in V. harveyi, such hybrid systems have been identified in many other bacterial species. Qrr RNA molecules are responsible for controlling regulator translation, repressing and promoting factors dependent on cell density. V. harveyi uses a second AI, termed autoinducer-2 or AI-2, which is unusual because it is made and detected by a variety of different bacteria, both Gram-negative and Gram-positive. Thus, V. harveyi has been instrumental to the understanding and appreciation of interspecies bacterial communication.

Previous research has characterized this quorum sensing (QS) system in V. harveyi as a "parallel circuit" due the system's architecture where multiple chemical signals are integrated to coordinate the production of bioluminescence. Other studies have underlined the coordination of this multi-channel signal transduction cascade with bacterial collective behaviors, such as virulence. Yet, this system appears to function with unique nuances when observed in vivo.

=== The three-channel sensory architecture ===
V. harveyi utilizes three distinct autoinducers (AIs) and three cognate membrane-bound receptors, all functioning in parallel, in order to channel information into a singular shared regulatory pathway:

==== System 1 (Intraspecies) ====
This system uses HAI-1 (Harveyi-Autoinducer 1), an acyl-homoserine lactone (AHL) produced by LuxM and detected by LuxN. This signal enables communication between V. harveyi members.

==== System 2 (Interspecies) ====
This system used AI-2 (Autoinducer 2), a furanosyl borate diester produced by LuxS and detected by the LuxPQ complex. This "universal signal" is both produced and detected by many different bacterial species, thus facilitating interspecies communication.

==== System 3 (Intrageneric) ====
This system uses CAI-1 (Cholerae-Autoinducer 1), produced by CqsA and detected by the CqsS sensor. This signal is shared among members of the Vibrio genus, thus enabling them to monitor the composition of the surrounding community.

=== Mechanisms: signal transduction & integration ===
While many bacteria use QS, V. harveyi is unique in how it processes these distinct signals, as it's done via a complex receptor phosphorelay system. This system operates differently depending on cell density:

==== Low cell density (LCD) ====
In the absence of AIs, the receptors (LuxN, LuxPQ, and CqsS) act as kinases, thus autophosphorylating and transferring a phosphate group via the shared LuxU phosphorelay protein to the LuxO response regulator. In turn, the phosphorylated LuxO activates the production of five small regulatory RNAs. With the help of the Hfq chaperone protein, these sRNAs destabilize the mRNA of the LuxR master transcriptional regulator. Thus preventing LuxR production and keeping bioluminescence inactivated.

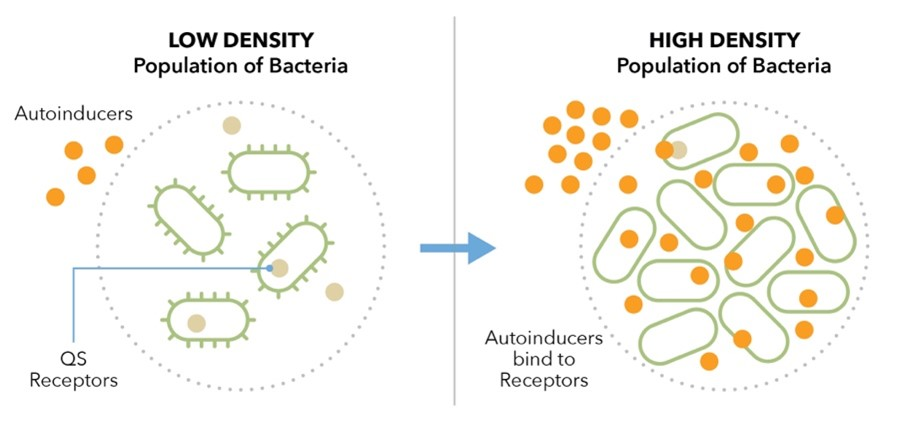
Quorum Sensing mechanism under different bacterial cell density conditions

==== High cell density (HCD) ====
On the other hand, when AIs reach a critical threshold and bind to their receptors, these switch from kinases to phosphatases. This results in LuxO dephosphorylation which stops sRNA production. Subsequently, the luxR mRNA is translated into the LuxR protein, which binds directly to the promoter of the luxCDABE operon to active bioluminescence.

=== Bioluminescence & the lux operon ===
V. harveyi has been defined as a primary member of the "luminous bacteria" group, and subsequently characterized by specific biochemical reactions enabling light emission.

For instance, the luciferase enzyme was found to be the responsible catalyst for bioluminescence. Light is only produced in V. harveyi when a reduced flavin mononucleotide (FMNH2) and long-chain aliphatic aldehyde are oxidized in the presence of O2. This oxidation reaction in turn releases energy as blue-green light, with a peak emission near 490 nm.

The luxCDABE genes found in the lux Operon encode this system. More specifically, luxA & luxB form the luciferase subunits while luxC, D, and E encode the fatty acid reductase complex responsible for regenerating the aldehyde substrate, ultimately enabling V. harveyi bioluminescence.

=== In vivo insights ===
The "parallel circuit" architecture described in V. harveyi, enabled it to act as a "coincidence detector" where the total concentration of LuxR, thus light intensity, is a result of the synergistic integration of all three signals.

==== Metabolic cost ====
Bioluminescence is energetically expensive, consuming significant amounts of oxygen and reducing power. However, the QS system serves as a powerful evolutionary "switch" by ensuring light is only produced when the population is large enough to be biologically functional, such as in symbiotic or pathogenic interactions.

==== Regulatory breath ====
Beyond light production, this system was also found to regulate other energy-expensive tasks such as metalloprotease production.

==== In vivo dominance ====
In vivo studies, specifically using brine shrimp, have also underlined that AI-2 & CAI-1 are the dominant signals driving QS (and virulence) during infection. Whereas HAI-1 has often been found to have little effect on pathogenicity.

==== Diagnostic tool ====
Bioluminescence also serves as a powerful way for researchers to monitor, in real-time, both when and where bacteria reach a quorum threshold within a host.

== Ecology & climate ==
The distribution and survival of V. harveyi are heavily influenced by specific environmental parameters, with recent research highlighting how fluctuating conditions in both natural and aquaculture settings drive the pathogen's prevalence and ability to colonize diverse marine niches.

=== Habitat preference & environmental conditions ===
V. harveyi has been shown to exhibit distinct spatial & temporal dynamics, primarily driven by factors such as water temperature, salinity, and depth.

==== Temporal & spatial dynamics ====
Longitudinal studies in aquaculture tanks have underlined that V. harveyi abundances are not uniform. They have been shown to fluctuate significantly over time and depth - for instance, in water tanks that are 4m deep, high concentrations of the bacteria are found in deep water layers where organic matter accumulation has occurred.

==== Biofilm vs water column ====
V. harveyi seems to also show a strong affinity for surface layers, notably characterized by frequent biofilm colonization. Even though Vibrionaceae are generally abundant in the water column, V. harveyi have specifically demonstrated a high prevalence in biofilms within fish farming facilities - which suggests these structures may be acting as environmental reservoirs for these bacteria, ultimately enabling them to persist despite changes in water conditions.

==== Predictive parameters ====
Seasonal dynamics are largely predictable using specific water quality metrics. For instance, high water temperature and distinct salinity ranges appear to be the strongest predictors for V. harveyi growth. Most notably, peak abundance seems to occur during the warmer summer and autumn months.

=== Adaptation ===
V. harveyi's ability to adapt to varying environmental stressors appears to be central to its success as a marine pathogen, particularly in regards to the combined impact of temperature and pH.

==== Temperature & pH ====
V. harveyi bacteria seem to exhibit a robust capacity for adaptation across a diverse range of environmental conditions. For instance, while water temperature seems to remain a primary driver of growth, its impact is significantly modulated by pH. Most notably, V. harveyi show optimal fitness at specific temperature-pH combinations, even though their ability to maintain cellular homeostasis remains challenged when both parameters shift simultaneously toward extremes.

==== Metabolic flexibility ====
Under such fluctuating conditions, V. harveyi are capable of adjusting their metabolic rate and protein expression. For instance, statistical investigations seem to indicate that these physiological shifts enable V. harveyi to remain competitive under intense aquaculture environments, despite rapid and significant variability in dissolved oxygen concentrations and nutrient availability.

=== Climate change ===
Recent epidemiological traits of V. harveyi have identified a strong link between global climate change and the expansion of the pathogen's geographic range, and subsequent virulence.

==== Warming oceans ====
The steady increase in global sea surface temperatures has been directly associated with the increased frequency of V. harveyi outbreaks. Due to the thermophilic nature of these bacteria, warming waters appear to provide a larger "thermal window" for their growth, thus enabling them to persist and reach QS thresholds in regions that had previously been too cold.

==== Epidemiological shifts ====
Subsequently, climate change has been altering the epidemiology of V. harveyi infections by creating ideal "bloom conditions". For instance, extreme weather events that alter coastal salinity, such as droughts or heavy rainfall, combined with the global rise in sea surface temperatures, seem to facilitate the spread of V. harveyi into new latitudes that had previously been unsuitable for their growth. This has led to an increased risk of vibriosis in both wild marine ecosystems as well as commercial fisheries.

== Impact & management ==
=== Aquaculture and marine organisms diseases ===
Many studies show that V. harveyi is associated with multiple diseases in wild and farmed species with species living in warm water environments becoming more vulnerable. The symptoms are diverse and in some cases can be so severe that they could lead to mass mortality.

==== Fish ====
The most prevalent disease caused by V. harveyi in the fish group is the eye disease which can cause blindness if left untreated. This disease has infected multiple fish species across multiple geographic regions, including Common snook (Centropomus undecimalis) in the USA, Milkfish (Chanos chanos) in the Philippines, and Short sunfish (Mola mola) in Spain. External, visible physical damage, such as nodules on operculum, scale drop, skin ulcers, and tail rot are documented in several studies as attributed with V. harveyi infection. Furthermore, V. harveyi has also reported to cause several internal damages in fish, such as muscle necrosis, gastro-enteritis vasculitis, necrotizing enteritis, meningitis, encephalitis, kidney necrosis and liver damage.

==== Invertebrates ====
===== Crustaceans (prawn, lobster) =====
In crustaceans, V. harveyi is known for its Luminous vibriosis, causing mass mortality in some prawn species, including black tiger prawn (Penaeus monodon), banana prawn (Penaeus merguiensis), and fresh water prawn (Macrobrachium rosenbergii), and in rock lobster (Jasus verreauxi). Infected prawns usually exhibit luminescence if they are in larval panaeid stage. While in infected adult prawns, key visible symptoms such as brown or black spots emerging on the shell, color changes in body surface and gills, absence of food in the midgut, opaque and folded base tail. Moreover, in species like kuruma prawn (Penaeus japonicus), brown tiger prawn (Penacaeus esculentus) and spiny lobster (Panulirus homarus), V. harveyi can also cause septicemia.

===== Mollusks (abalone, oyster) =====
V. harveyi is reported to cause mortality in several mollusk species such as pearl oyster (Pinctada maxima) and Japanese abalone (Halio discus hannai). In pearl oysters, diseased individuals also exhibit tissue lesions. Japanese abalone usually have white spots on their feet if they are infected by V. harveyi.

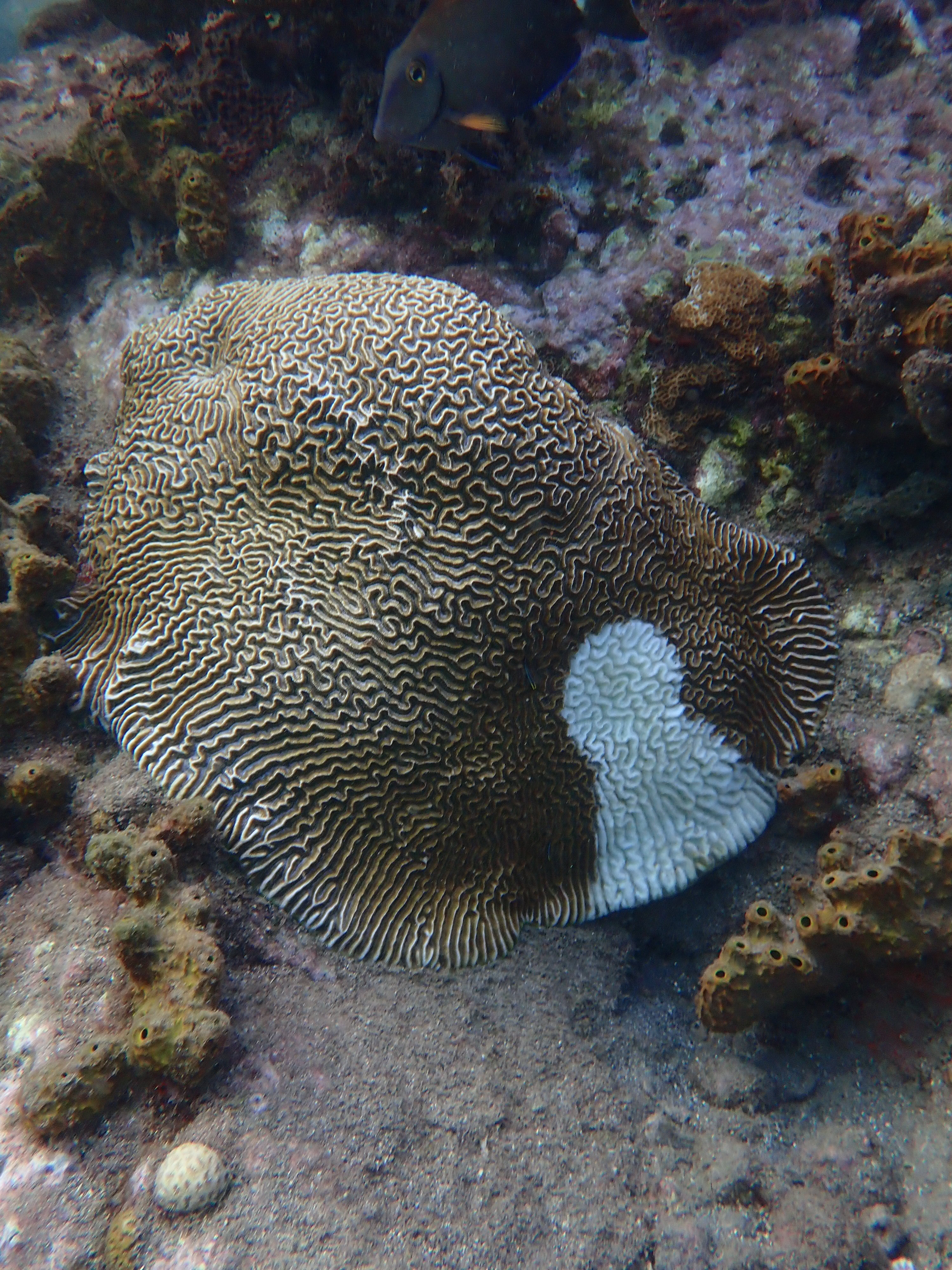
Tissue loss appearing as a white spots or also known as White Syndrome as a results of V. harveyi infection in stony coral.

===== Echinoderms (sea cucumber) =====
It has also been documented that V. harveyi is associated with skin ulceration disease in juvenile sea cucumbers (Holothuria scabra). Infected sea cucumbers were reported to be fatal after developing rapidly spread white spots on their bodies.

===== Corals =====
Similarly, research indicated that V. harveyi is one of the pathogens causing tissue loss that create white spots in tropical stony corals also known as White Syndrome. White Syndrome includes multiple diseases such as 'White Band', 'White Plague', and 'Shut Down Reaction'.

=== Aquaculture-economic impact ===
Numerous aquaculture losses, particularly in farmed prawns, have been reported mainly due to mass mortality associated with Luminous vibriosis disease caused by V. harveyi. Factors such as higher amounts of organic matter on the aquaculture pond and aerosol transmission were suggested as causes of Luminous vibriosis in aquaculture. Additionally, the infection spread is reported to be relatively short, especially when cultured with other Vibrio species, resulting in approximately 10 days of 29% losses in farmed juvenile hybrid grouper (E. polyphekadion x E. fuscoguttatus) creating significant economic impacts. A more recent study mentions that V. harveyi has caused substantial economic loss, including 35% loss of aquacultured black rockfish (Sebastes schegeli) due to skin ulcer in Nuanhuangcheng Island.

=== Prevention and control ===
Given the widespread impacts of V. harveyi on marine and aquaculture organisms, several control alternatives have been explored.

==== Biofloc technology ====
A study found that glycerol-grown biofloc can increase the survival of the V. harveyi-infected larval of gnotobiotic brine shrimp (Artemia franciscana) from Luminous vibriosis by reducing V. harveyi's quorum sensing.

==== Vaccines ====
Various vaccines have been developed and largely marketed to control the shrimp and fish disease associated with V. harveyi. This includes whole-cell vaccines in which injection into barramundi fish (Lates calcarifer) has succeeded in making this species produce antibodies. Subunit vaccines also achieved a relative percentage of survival (RPS) of 61.5% in an experiment using sea bass (Latolabrax japonicus). Additionally, a live recombinant vaccine called OMP VhhP2 was also able to produce 92.3% RPS when injected in Japanese flounder (Paralichthys olivaceus). Lastly, a DNA vaccine also has been developed and results in a wider range of RPSs.

==== Bacteriophages therapy ====
Several studies reported that lytic bacteriophage therapy, such as using Myoviridae and their combination with Siphoviridae, has been able to control Luminous vibriosis in farmed shrimp. A study also shows that using lytic bacteriophage isolated from V. harveyi infected prawn can be used for phage therapy for pathogenic bacteria infections in aquaculture species.
