= Autoinducer =

Signaling molecule enabling detection and response to cell-population density

A signaling molecule involved in bacterial quorum sensing. The concentration of autoinducers increases with bacterial cell density, and high concentrations of these molecules can trigger group behaviors such as bioluminescence and the formation of biofilms.

In biology, an autoinducer is a signaling molecule that enables detection and response to changes in the population density of bacterial cells. Synthesized when a bacterium reproduces, autoinducers pass outside the bacterium and into the surrounding medium. They are a key component of the phenomenon of quorum sensing: as the density of quorum-sensing bacterial cells increases, so does the concentration of the autoinducer. A bacterium's detection of an autoinducer above some minimum threshold triggers altered gene expression.

Performed by both Gram-negative and Gram-positive bacteria, detection of autoinducers allow them to sense one another and to regulate a wide variety of physiological activities, including symbiosis, virulence, motility, production of antibiotics, and formation of biofilms.

Autoinducers take a number of different forms depending on the species of bacteria, but their effect is in many cases similar. They allow bacteria to communicate both within and between species, and thus to mount coordinated responses to their environments in a manner that is comparable to behavior and signaling in higher organisms. Not surprisingly, it has been suggested that quorum sensing may have been an important evolutionary milestone that ultimately gave rise to multicellular life forms.

== Discovery ==
The term autoinduction was first coined in 1970, when it was observed that the bioluminescent marine bacterium Vibrio fischeri produced a luminescent enzyme (luciferase) only when cultures had reached a threshold population density. At low cell concentrations, V. fischeri did not express the luciferase gene. However, during the cultures’ exponential growth phase, the luciferase gene was rapidly activated. This phenomenon was called autoinduction because it involved a molecule (the autoinducer) produced by the bacteria themselves that accumulated in the growth medium and induced the synthesis of components of the luminescence system. Subsequent research revealed that the actual autoinducer used by V. fischeri is an acylated homoserine lactone (AHL) signaling molecule.

== Mechanism ==
In the most simplified quorum sensing systems, bacteria only need two components to make use of autoinducers. They need a way to produce a signal and a way to respond to that signal. These cellular processes are often tightly coordinated and involve changes in gene expression. The production of autoinducers generally increases as bacterial cell densities increase. Most signals are produced intracellularly and are subsequently secreted in the extracellular environment. Detection of autoinducers often involves diffusion back into cells and binding to specific receptors. Usually, binding of autoinducers to receptors does not occur until a threshold concentration of autoinducers is achieved. Once this has occurred, bound receptors alter gene expression either directly or indirectly. Some receptors are transcription factors themselves, while others relay signals to downstream transcription factors. In many cases, autoinducers participate in forward feedback loops, whereby a small initial concentration of an autoinducer amplifies the production of that same chemical signal to much higher levels.

== Classes ==
=== Acylated homoserine lactones ===
Primarily produced by Gram-negative bacteria, acylated homoserine lactones (AHLs) are a class of small neutral lipid molecules composed of a homoserine lactone ring with an acyl chain. AHLs produced by different species of Gram-negative bacteria vary in the length and composition of the acyl side chain, which often contains 4 to 18 carbon atoms. AHLs are synthesized by AHL syntheses. They diffuse in and out of cells by both passive transport and active transport mechanisms. Receptors for AHLs include a number of transcriptional regulators called "R proteins," which function as DNA binding transcription factors or sensor kinases.

=== Peptides ===
Gram-positive bacteria that participate in quorum sensing typically use secreted oligopeptides as autoinducers. Peptide autoinducers usually result from posttranslational modification of a larger precursor molecule. In many Gram-positive bacteria, secretion of peptides requires specialized export mechanisms. For example, some peptide autoinducers are secreted by ATP-binding cassette transporters that couple proteolytic processing and cellular export. Following secretion, peptide autoinducers accumulate in extracellular environments. Once a threshold level of signal is reached, a histidine sensor kinase protein of a two-component regulatory system detects it and a signal is relayed into the cell. As with AHLs, the signal ultimately ends up altering gene expression. Unlike some AHLs, however, most oligopeptides do not act as transcription factors themselves.

=== Furanosyl borate diester ===
The free-living bioluminescent marine bacterium, Vibrio harveyi, uses another signaling molecule in addition to an acylated homoserine lactone. This molecule, termed Autoinducer-2 (or AI-2), is a furanosyl borate diester. AI-2, which is also produced and used by a number of Gram-negative and Gram-positive bacteria, is believed to be an evolutionary link between the two major types of quorum sensing circuits.

== In gram-negative bacteria ==
As mentioned, Gram-negative bacteria primarily use acylated homoserine lactones (AHLs) as autoinducer molecules. The minimum quorum sensing circuit in Gram-negative bacteria consists of a protein that synthesizes an AHL and a second, different protein that detects it and causes a change in gene expression. First identified in V. fischeri, these two such proteins are LuxI and LuxR, respectively. Other Gram-negative bacteria use LuxI-like and LuxR-like proteins (homologs), suggesting a high degree of evolutionary conservation. However, among Gram-negatives, the LuxI/LuxI-type circuit has been modified in different species. Described in more detail below, these modifications reflect bacterial adaptations to grow and respond to particular niche environments.

=== Vibrio fischeri: bioluminescence ===
Ecologically, V. fischeri is known to have symbiotic associations with a number of eukaryotic hosts, including the Hawaiian Bobtail Squid (Euprymna scolopes). In this relationship, the squid host maintains the bacteria in specialized light organs. The host provides a safe, nutrient rich environment for the bacteria and in turn, the bacteria provide light. Although bioluminescence can be used for mating and other purposes, in E. scolopes it is used for counter illumination to avoid predation.

The autoinducer molecule used by V. fischeri is N-(3-oxohexanoyl)-homoserine lactone. This molecule is produced in the cytoplasm by the LuxI synthase enzyme and is secreted through the cell membrane into the extracellular environment. As is true of most autoinducers, the environmental concentration of N-(3-oxohexanoyl)-homoserine lactone is the same as the intracellular concentration within each cell. N-(3-oxohexanoyl)-homoserine lactone eventually diffuses back into cells where it is recognized by LuxR once a threshold concentration (~10 μg/ml) has been reached. LuxR binds the autoinducer and directly activates transcription of the luxICDABE operon. This results in an exponential increase in both the production of autoinducer and in bioluminescence. LuxR bound by autoinducer also inhibits the expression of luxR, which is thought to provide a negative feedback compensatory mechanism to tightly control levels of the bioluminescence genes.

=== Pseudomonas aeruginosa: virulence and antibiotic production ===
P. aeruginosa is an opportunistic human pathogen associated with cystic fibrosis. In P. aeruginosa infections, quorum sensing is critical for biofilm formation and pathogenicity. P. aeruginosa contains two pairs of LuxI/LuxR homologs, LasI/LasR and RhlI, RhlR. LasI and RhlI are synthase enzymes that catalyze the synthesis of N-(3-oxododecanoyl)-homoserine lactone and N-(butyryl)-homoserine lactone, respectively. The LasI/LasR and the RhlI/RhlR circuits function in tandem to regulate the expression of a number of virulence genes. At a threshold concentration, LasR binds N-(3-oxododecanoyl)-homoserine lactone. Together this bound complex promotes the expression of virulence factors that are responsible for early stages of the infection process.

LasR bound by its autoinducer also activates the expression of the RhlI/RhlR system in P. aeruginosa. This causes the expression of RhlR which then binds its autoinducer, N-(butryl)-homoserine lactone. In turn, autoinducer-bound RhlR activates a second class of genes involved in later stages of infection, including genes needed for antibiotic production. Presumably, antibiotic production by P. aeruginosa is used to prevent opportunistic infections by other bacterial species. N-(3-oxododecanoyl)-homoserine lactone prevents binding between N-(butryl)-homoserine lactone and its cognate regulator, RhlR. It is believed that this control mechanism allows P. aeruginosa to initiate the quorum-sensing cascades sequentially and in the appropriate order so that a proper infection cycle can ensue.

=== Other gram-negative autoinducers ===
- P. aeruginosa also uses 2-heptyl-3-hydroxy-4-quinolone (PQS) for quorum sensing. This molecule is noteworthy because it does not belong to the homoserine lactone class of autoinducers. PQS is believed to provide an additional regulatory link between the Las and Rhl circuits involved in virulence and infection.
- Agrobacterium tumefaciens is a plant pathogen that induces tumors on susceptible hosts. Infection by A. tumefaciens involves the transfer of an oncogenic plasmid from the bacterium to the host cell nucleus, while quorum sensing controls the conjugal transfer of plasmids between bacteria. Conjugation, on the other hand, requires the HSL autoinducer, N-(3-oxooctanoyl)-homoserine lactone.
- Erwinia carotovora is another plant pathogen that causes soft-rot disease. These bacteria secrete cellulases and pectinases, which are enzymes that degrade plant cell walls. ExpI/ExpR are LuxI/LuxR homologs in E. carotovora believed to control secretion of these enzymes only when a high enough local cell density is achieved. The autoinducer involved in quorum sensing in E. carotovora is N-(3-oxohexanoyl)-L-homoserine lactone.

== In gram-positive bacteria ==
Whereas Gram-negative bacteria primarily use acylated homoserine lactones, Gram-positive bacteria generally use oligopeptides as autoinducers for quorum sensing. These molecules are often synthesized as larger polypeptides that are cleaved post-translationally to produce "processed" peptides. Unlike AHLs that can freely diffuse across cell membranes, peptide autoinducers usually require specialized transport mechanisms (often ABC transporters). Additionally, they do not freely diffuse back into cells, so bacteria that use them must have mechanisms to detect them in their extracellular environments. Most Gram-positive bacteria use a two-component signaling mechanism in quorum sensing. Secreted peptide autoinducers accumulate as a function of cell density. Once a quorum level of autoinducer is achieved, its interaction with a sensor kinase at the cell membrane initiates a series of phosphorylation events that culminate in the phosphorylation of a regulator protein intracellularly. This regulator protein subsequently functions as a transcription factor and alters gene expression. Similar to Gram-negative bacteria, the autoinduction and quorum sensing system in Gram-positive bacteria is conserved, but again, individual species have tailored specific aspects for surviving and communicating in unique niche environments.

=== Streptococcus pneumoniae: competence ===
S. pneumoniae is human pathogenic bacterium in which the process of genetic transformation was first described in the 1930s. In order for a bacterium to take up exogenous DNA from its surroundings, it must become competent. In S. pneumoniae, a number of complex events must occur to achieve a competent state, but it is believed that quorum sensing plays a role. Competence stimulating peptide (CSP) is a 17-amino acid peptide autoinducer required for competency and subsequent genetic transformation. CSP is produced by proteolytic cleavage of a 41-amino acid precursor peptide (ComC); is secreted by an ABC transporter (ComAB); and is detected by a sensor kinase protein (ComD) once it has reached a threshold concentration. Detection is followed by autophosphorylation of ComD, which in turn, phosphorylates ComE. ComE is a response regulator responsible for activating transcription of comX, the product of which is required to activate transcription of a number of other genes involved in the development of competence.

=== Bacillus subtilis: competence & sporulation ===
B. subtilis is a soil-dwelling microbe that uses quorum sensing to regulate two different biological processes: competence and sporulation. During stationary growth phase when B. subtilis are at high cell density, approximately 10% of the cells in a population are induced to become competent. It is believed that this subpopulation becomes competent to take up DNA that could potentially be used for the repair of damaged (mutated) chromosomes. ComX (also known as competence factor) is a 10-amino acid peptide that is processed from a 55-amino acid peptide precursor. Like most autoinducers, ComX is secreted and accumulates as a function of cell density. Once a threshold extracellular level is achieved, ComX is detected by a two-component ComP/ComA sensor kinase/response regulator pair. Phosphorylation of ComA activates the expression of comS gene, ComS inhibits the degradation of ComK, and finally ComK activates the expression of a number of genes required for competence.

Sporulation, on the other hand, is a physiological response of B. subtilis to depletion of nutrients within a particular environment. It is also regulated by extracellular signaling. When B. subtilis populations sense waning conditions, they respond by undergoing asymmetric cell division. This ultimately produces spores that are adapted for dispersal and survival in unfavorable conditions. Sporulation in B. subtilis is mediated by CSF (sporulation factor), a pentapeptide cleaved from the precursor peptide PhrC. CSF is secreted into the extracellular environment and is taken back up into cells via the ABC transporter Opp where it acts intracellularly. While low internal concentrations of CSF contribute to competence, high concentrations induce sporulation. CSF inhibits a phosphatase, RabB, which increases the activity of Spo0A, favoring a switch in commitment from competence to the sporulation pathway
