= Autoinducer-2 =

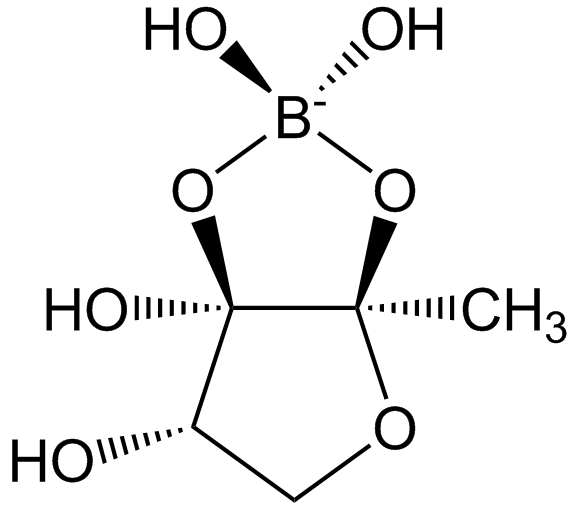
- Autoinducer-2

Names
- Preferred IUPAC name (3aS,6S,6aR)-2,2,6,6a-Tetrahydroxy-3a-methyltetrahydro-2H-furo[2,3-d][1,3,2]dioxaborol-2-uide
- Other names Dihydroxy[(2S,3R,4S)-2-methyldihydro-

Identifiers
3D model (JSmol)	Interactive image
Abbreviations	AI-2
ChEBI	CHEBI:40646
ChEMBL	ChEMBL1230903
ChemSpider	393894
KEGG	C16421
PubChem CID	446576
CompTox Dashboard (EPA)	DTXSID201027132
- InChI: InChI=1S/C5H10BO7/c1-4-5(8,3(7)2-11-4)13-6(9,10)12-4/h3,7-10H,2H2,1H3/q-1/t3-,4+,5+/m0/s1 Key: ACKRRKSNOOISSG-VPENINKCSA-N; InChI=1/C5H10BO7/c1-4-5(8,3(7)2-11-4)13-6(9,10)12-4/h3,7-10H,2H2,1H3/q-1/t3-,4+,5+/m0/s1 Key: ACKRRKSNOOISSG-VPENINKCBL
- SMILES: O[C@@H]1[C@]2(O[B-](O[C@]2(OC1)C)(O)O)O

Properties
Chemical formula	C_{5}H_{10}BO_{7}
Molar mass	192.940
- Except where otherwise noted, data are given for materials in their standard state (at 25 °C [77 °F], 100 kPa). verify (what is ?) Infobox references

Autoinducer-2 (AI-2) is a furanosyl borate diester or tetrahydroxy furan (species dependent) that—as the name suggests—is an autoinducer, a member of a family of signaling molecules used in quorum sensing. AI-2 is one of only a few known biomolecules incorporating boron. First identified in the marine bacterium Vibrio harveyi, AI-2 is produced and recognized by many Gram-negative and Gram-positive bacteria. AI-2 arises by the reaction of 4,5-dihydroxy-2,3-pentanedione, which is produced enzymatically, with boric acid and is recognized by the two-component sensor kinase LuxPQ in Vibrionaceae.

AI-2 is actively transported by the Lsr ABC-type transporter into the cell in Enterobacteriaceae and few other bacterial taxa such as Pasteurella, Photorhabdus, Haemophilus, and Bacillus, where it is phosphorylated by LsrK. Then, Phospho-AI-2 binds the transcriptional repressor protein, LsrR, which subsequently is released from the promoter/operator region of the lsr operon – and transcription of the lsr genes is initiated. AI-2 signalling is also regulated by glucose and cAMP/CRP via the lsr operon. In the presence of glucose, low levels of cAMP/CRP result in almost no lsr operon (lsrABCDFG) expression. Without glucose, cAMP-CRP is needed to stimulate the lsr expression, while LsrR represses its expression in the absence of the inducer, phospho-AI-2. As AI-2 accumulates, more AI-2 is taken in via LsrABCD, phosphorylated via LsrK, and the lsr transcription is de-repressed, enabling even more AI-2 uptake.

Doubts have been expressed regarding AI-2's status as a universal signal. Although the luxS gene, which encodes the protein responsible for AI-2 production is widespread, the latter has mainly a primary metabolic role in the recycling of S-adenosyl-L-methionine, with AI-2 being a by-product of that process. An unequivocally AI-2 related behavior was found to be restricted primarily to organisms bearing known AI-2 receptor genes. Thus, while it is certainly true that some bacteria respond to AI-2, it is doubtful that it is always being produced for purposes of signaling.

== Mimicry by host cells ==
It has been found that in response to bacteria or to disruption of the tight junction, mammalian epithelial cells synthesize an AI-2 mimic that triggers quorum sensing and may play an important role in enlisting gut microbes that are known to assist in epithelial healing. In reporting these findings, the researchers write that their results “suggest that crosskingdom communication occurs between eukaryotic cells and bacteria via the AI-2 bacterial quorum-sensing system.”
