= Quorum sensing =

Biological ability to detect and respond to cell population density

In biology, quorum sensing or quorum signaling (QS) is the process of cell-to-cell communication that allows bacteria to detect and respond to cell population density by gene regulation, typically as a means of acclimating to environmental disadvantages.

Quorum sensing is a type of cellular signaling, and can be more specifically considered a type of paracrine signaling. However, it also contains traits of autocrine signaling: a cell produces both an autoinducer molecule and the receptor for the autoinducer. As one example, quorum sensing enables bacteria to restrict the expression of specific genes to the high cell densities at which the resulting phenotypes will be most beneficial, especially for phenotypes that would be ineffective at low cell densities and therefore too energetically costly to express.

Many species of bacteria use quorum sensing to coordinate gene expression according to the density of their local population. In a similar fashion, some social insects use quorum sensing to determine where to nest. Quorum sensing in pathogenic bacteria activates host immune signaling and prolongs host survival, by limiting the bacterial intake of nutrients, such as tryptophan, which further is converted to serotonin. As such, quorum sensing allows a commensal interaction between host and pathogenic bacteria. Quorum sensing may also be useful for cancer cell communications.

In addition to its function in biological systems, quorum sensing has several useful applications for computing and robotics. In general, quorum sensing can function as a decision-making process in any decentralized system in which the components have: (a) a means of assessing the number of other components they interact with and (b) a standard response once a threshold of the number of components is detected.

== Discovery ==
The first observations of an autoinducer-controlled phenotype in bacteria were reported in 1970, by Kenneth Nealson, Terry Platt, and J. Woodland Hastings, who observed what they described as a conditioning of the medium in which they had grown the bioluminescent marine bacterium Aliivibrio fischeri. These bacteria did not synthesize luciferase—and therefore did not luminesce—in freshly inoculated culture but only after the bacterial population had increased significantly.

In a series of publications from 1998 to 2001, Bonnie Bassler showed that quorum sensing is not just an isolated mechanism in Aliivibrio fischeri, but is used ubiquitously across bacteria to communicate. This advance demonstrated that bacteria are capable of carrying out complex, collective behaviors.

== Etymology ==
Because Nealson, Platt, and Hastings attributed the conditioning of the growth medium to the growing population of cells itself, they referred to the phenomenon as autoinduction.

In 1994, after study of the phenomenon had expanded into several additional bacteria, Stephen Winans did not believe the word autoinduction fully characterized the true process so, in a review article coauthored with W. Claiborne Fuqua and E. Peter Greenberg, he introduced the term quorum sensing. Its use also avoided confusion between the terms autoinduction and autoregulation. The new term was not stumbled onto, but rather created through trial and error. Among the alternatives that Winans had created and considered were gridlockins, communiolins, and quoromones.

== Bacteria ==
Quorum sensing of gram-negative cell

Gram-positive bacteria quorum sensing

Some of the best-known examples of quorum sensing come from studies of bacteria. Bacteria use quorum sensing to regulate certain phenotype expressions, which in turn, coordinate their behaviors. Some common phenotypes include biofilm formation, virulence factor expression, and motility. Certain bacteria are able to use quorum sensing to regulate bioluminescence, nitrogen fixation and sporulation.

The quorum-sensing function is based on the local density of the bacterial population in the immediate environment. It can occur within a single bacterial species, as well as between diverse species. Both gram-positive and gram-negative bacteria use quorum sensing, but there are some major differences in their mechanisms.

=== Mechanism ===
For the bacteria to use quorum sensing constitutively, they must possess three abilities: secretion of a signaling molecule, secretion of an autoinducer (to detect the change in concentration of signaling molecules), and regulation of gene transcription as a response. This process is highly dependent on the diffusion mechanism of the signaling molecules. QS signaling molecules are usually secreted at a low level by individual bacteria. At low cell density, the molecules may just diffuse away. At high cell density, the local concentration of signaling molecules may exceed its threshold level, and trigger changes in gene expression.

==== Gram-positive bacteria ====
Gram-positive bacteria use autoinducing peptides (AIP) as their autoinducers.

When gram-positive bacteria detect high concentration of AIPs in their environment, that happens by way of AIPs binding to a receptor to activate a kinase. The kinase phosphorylates a transcription factor, which regulates gene transcription. This is called a two-component system.

Another possible mechanism is that AIP is transported into the cytosol, and binds directly to a transcription factor to initiate or inhibit transcription.

==== Gram-negative bacteria ====
Gram-negative bacteria produce N-acyl homoserine lactones (AHL) as their signaling molecule. Usually AHLs do not need additional processing, and bind directly to transcription factors to regulate gene expression.

Some gram-negative bacteria may use two-component systems as well.

=== Examples ===
==== Aliivibrio fischeri ====
The bioluminescent bacterium Aliivibrio fischeri is the first organism in which QS was observed. It lives as a mutualistic symbiont in the photophore (or light-producing organ) of the Hawaiian bobtail squid. When A. fischeri cells are free-living (or planktonic), the autoinducer is at low concentration, and, thus, cells do not show luminescence. However, when the population reaches the threshold in the photophore (about 10^{11} cells/ml), transcription of luciferase is induced, leading to bioluminescence. In A. fischeri, bioluminescence is regulated by AHLs (N-acyl-homoserine lactones) which is a product of the LuxI gene whose transcription is regulated by the LuxR activator. LuxR works only when AHLs binds to the LuxR.

==== Curvibacter sp. ====
Curvibacter sp. is a gram-negative curved rod-formed bacterium which is the main colonizer of the epithelial cell surfaces of the early branching metazoan Hydra vulgaris. Sequencing the complete genome uncovered a circular chromosome (4.37 Mb), a plasmid (16.5 kb), and two operons coding each for an AHL (N-acyl-homoserine lactone) synthase (curI1 and curI2) and an AHL receptor (curR1 and curR2). Moreover, a study showed that these host associated Curvibacter bacteria produce a broad spectrum of AHL, explaining the presence of those operons. As mentioned before, AHL are the quorum sensing molecules of gram-negative bacteria, which means Curvibacter has a quorum sensing activity.

Even though their function in host-microbe interaction is largely unknown, Curvibacter quorum-sensing signals are relevant for host-microbe interactions. Indeed, due to the oxidoreductase activity of Hydra, there is a modification of AHL signalling molecules (3-oxo-homoserine lactone into 3-hydroxy-homoserine lactone) which leads to a different host-microbe interaction. On one hand, a phenotypic switch of the colonizer Curvibacter takes place. The most likely explanation is that the binding of 3-oxo-HSL and 3-hydroxy-HSL causes different conformational changes in the AHL receptors curR1 and curR2. As a result, there is a different DNA-binding motif affinity and thereby different target genes are activated. On the other hand, this switch modifies its ability to colonize the epithelial cell surfaces of Hydra vulgaris. Indeed, one explanation is that with a 3-oxo-HSL quorum-sensing signal, there is an up-regulation of flagellar assembly. Yet, flagellin, the main protein component of flagella, can act as an immunomodulator and activate the innate immune response in Hydra. Therefore, bacteria have less chance to evade the immune system and to colonize host tissues. Another explanation is that 3-hydroxy-HSL induces carbon metabolism and fatty acid degradation genes in Hydra. This allows the bacterial metabolism to adjust itself to the host growth conditions, which is essential for the colonization of the ectodermal mucus layer of Hydrae.

==== Enterococcus faecalis ====
Enterococcus faecalis is an opportunistic, gram-positive bacteria that forms biofilm in glass. This process is also known as forming a biofilm in vitro. The presence of (Esp), a certain cell surface protein, aids the formation of a biofilm by E. faecalis.

The ability of E. faecalis to form biofilms contributes to its capacity to survive in extreme environments, and facilitates its involvement in persistent bacterial infection, particularly in the case of multi-drug resistant strains. Biofilm formation in E. faecalis is associated with DNA release, and such release has emerged as a fundamental aspect of biofilm formation. Conjugative plasmid DNA transfer in E. faecalis is enhanced by the release of peptide sex pheromones.

==== Escherichia coli ====
In the gram-negative bacterium Escherichia coli, cell division may be partially regulated by AI-2-mediated quorum sensing. This species uses AI-2, which is produced and processed by the lsr operon. Part of it encodes an ABC transporter, which imports AI-2 into the cells during the early stationary (latent) phase of growth. AI-2 is then phosphorylated by the LsrK kinase, and the newly produced phospho-AI-2 can be either internalized or used to suppress LsrR, a repressor of the lsr operon (thereby activating the operon). Transcription of the lsr operon is also thought to be inhibited by dihydroxyacetone phosphate (DHAP) through its competitive binding to LsrR. Glyceraldehyde 3-phosphate has also been shown to inhibit the lsr operon through cAMP-CAPK-mediated inhibition. This explains why, when grown with glucose, E. coli will lose the ability to internalize AI-2 (because of catabolite repression). When grown normally, AI-2 presence is transient.

E. coli and Salmonella enterica do not produce AHL signals commonly found in other gram-negative bacteria. However, they have a receptor that detects AHLs from other bacteria and change their gene expression in accordance with the presence of other "quorate" populations of gram-negative bacteria. AHL quorum sensing regulates a wide range of genes through cell density. Other species of bacteria produce AHLs that Escherichia and Salmonella can detect. E. coli and Salmonella produce a receptor like protein (SdiA) allowing the amino acid sequence that is similar to AHL show AHLs can be found in the bovine rumen and E. coli responds to AHLs taken out of the bovine rumen. Most animals do not have AHL in their gastrointestinal tracts.

==== Salmonella enterica ====
Salmonella encodes a LuxR homolog, SdiA, but does not encode an AHL synthase. SdiA detects AHLs produced by other species of bacteria including Aeromonas hydrophila, Hafnia alvei, and Yersinia enterocolitica. When AHL is detected, SdiA regulates the rck operon on the Salmonella virulence plasmid (pefI-srgD-srgA-srgB-rck-srgC) and a single gene horizontal acquisition in the chromosome srgE. Salmonella does not detect AHL when passing through the gastrointestinal tracts of several animal species, suggesting that the normal microbiota does not produce AHLs. However, SdiA does become activated when Salmonella transits through turtles colonized with Aeromonas hydrophila or mice infected with Yersinia enterocolitica. Therefore, Salmonella appears to use SdiA to detect the AHL production of other pathogens rather than the normal gut flora.

==== Myxococcus xanthus ====
Myxococcus is a genus of gram-negative bacterium in the Myxococcacae family. Myxococcus xanthus specifically, a bacillus myxobacteria species within Myxococcae, grows in the upper layers of soil. This bacterium is known for its unique utilization of quorum sensing practices to hunt.

The bacterium uniquely survives not on sugars, but lipids created by the degradation of macromolecules lysed by the species. It hunts and feeds through a density-regulated method of predation that is "the regulation of gene expression in response to cell density." The pilus propelled microorganism moves with the use of both S- and A- (or gliding) motility, which provide transportation across a dynamic range of different surfaces. M. xanthus's A-motility is most effective in the presence of a single or low number of cells, allowing the bacteria to glide in high agar concentrations. The S-motility, or social motility, is controlled by the process of quorum sensing and is only effective when cells are within one cell length of a neighbor. Although the precise specifics of M. xanthus's communication methods for quorum sensing are not well understood, the bacteria mediate the process by using both C-signal and A-factor. The A-factor molecule, produced by M. xanthus, must reach a set concentration to initiate aggregation for hunting. The C-signal concentration, on the other hand, plays a role in fruiting body production.

The species is known for its ability to use quorum sensing to hunt in special packs with thousands of individual cells, lending to M. xanthus's name "the wolf packs." M. xanthus is inclined to behave in a multicellular fashion. In the presence of many cells, it uses these "wolf packs" to form "highly structured biofilms that include tentacle-like packs of surface-gliding cell groups, synchronized rippling waves of oscillating cells and massive spore-filled aggregates that protrude upwards from the substratum to form fruiting bodies." On the fringes of this film, individual cells can be observed "gliding across the surface, but the majority of cells are observed in large tendril-shaped groups" using S-motility.

==== Staphylococcus aureus ====
Staphylococcus aureus is a type of pathogen that causes infection to the skin and soft tissue and can lead to a variety of more severe diseases such as osteomyelitis, pneumonia, and endocarditis. S. aureus uses biofilms in order to increase its chances of survival by becoming resistant to antibiotics. Biofilms help S. aureus become up to 1500 times more resistant to antibiofilm agents, which try to break down biofilms formed by S. aureus.

==== Streptococcus pneumoniae ====
Each year Streptococcus pneumoniae kills more than a million people, even though vaccines are available. A complex quorum sensing system has evolved in S. pneumoniae that regulates bacteriocin production. This system also enables entry into the competent state essential for natural genetic transformation. In naturally competent S. pneumoniae the competent state is not a constitutive property. However competence can be induced by a peptide pheromone by means of a quorum-sensing mechanism. When the competent state is induced, this causes release of DNA from a sub-fraction of the S. pneumoniae population, probably by cell lysis. Then most of the S. pneumoniae cells that have been induced to competence become recipients and take up the DNA released by the donors. Thus it appears that natural transformation in S. pneumoniae is a natural adaptive process for promoting genetic recombination, a process that resembles sexual reproduction in higher organisms.

==== Pseudomonas aeruginosa ====
The environmental bacterium and opportunistic pathogen Pseudomonas aeruginosa uses quorum sensing to coordinate the formation of biofilm, swarming motility, exopolysaccharide production, virulence, and cell aggregation. These bacteria can grow within a host without harming it until they reach a threshold concentration. Then they become aggressive, developing to the point at which their numbers are sufficient to overcome the host's immune system, and form a biofilm, leading to disease within the host as the biofilm is a protective layer encasing the bacterial population. The relative ease of growth, handling, and genetic manipulation of P. aeruginosa has lent much research effort to the quorum sensing circuits of this relatively common bacterium. Quorum sensing in P. aeruginosa typically encompasses two complete AHL synthase-receptor circuits, LasI-LasR and RhlI-RhlR, as well as the orphan receptor-regulator QscR, which is also activated by the LasI-generated signal. Together, the multiple AHL quorum sensing circuits of P. aeruginosa influence regulation of hundreds of genes.

Another form of gene regulation that allows the bacteria to rapidly adapt to surrounding changes is through environmental signaling. Recent studies have discovered that anaerobiosis can significantly impact the major regulatory circuit of quorum sensing. This important link between quorum sensing and anaerobiosis has a significant impact on the production of virulence factors of this organism. There is hope among some humans that the therapeutic enzymatic degradation of the signaling molecules will be possible when treating illness caused by biofilms, and prevent the formation of such biofilms and possibly weaken established biofilms. Disrupting the signaling process in this way is called quorum sensing inhibition.

==== Acinetobacter sp. ====
It has recently been found that Acinetobacter sp. also show quorum sensing activity. This bacterium, an emerging pathogen, produces AHLs. Acinetobacter sp. shows both quorum sensing and quorum quenching activity. It produces AHLs and can also degrade the AHL molecules.

==== Aeromonas sp. ====
This bacterium was previously considered a fish pathogen, but it has recently emerged as a human pathogen. Aeromonas sp. have been isolated from various infected sites from patients (bile, blood, peritoneal fluid, pus, stool and urine). All isolates produced the two principal AHLs, N-butanoylhomoserine lactone (C4-HSL) and N-hexanoyl homoserine lactone (C6-HSL). It has been documented that Aeromonas sobria has produced C6-HSL and two additional AHLs with N-acyl side chain longer than C6.

==== Yersinia ====
The YenR and YenI proteins produced by the gammaproteobacterium Yersinia enterocolitica are similar to Aliivibrio fischeri LuxR and LuxI. YenR activates the expression of a small non-coding RNA, YenS. YenS inhibits YenI expression and acylhomoserine lactone production. YenR/YenI/YenS are involved in the control of swimming and swarming motility.

==== Vibrio cholerae ====
V. cholerae is a bacterial pathogen that causes cholera, a disease associated with severe contagious diarrhea that affects millions of people worldwide. V. cholerae is capable of strong communication between cells, and this process is referred to as quorum-sensing. In the small intestine, the absence of oxygen and exposure to host-produced bile salts, influence V. cholerae quorum sensing function and thus its pathogenicity. Quorum sensing appears to contribute to natural genetic transformation, a process that involves the uptake of V. cholerae extracellular DNA by (competent) V. cholerae cells.

=== Molecules involved ===
Three-dimensional structures of proteins involved in quorum sensing were first published in 2001, when the crystal structures of three LuxS orthologs were determined by X-ray crystallography. In 2002, the crystal structure of the receptor LuxP of Vibrio harveyi with its inducer AI-2 (which is one of the few biomolecules containing boron) bound to it was also determined. Many bacterial species, including E. coli, an enteric bacterium and model organism for gram-negative bacteria, produce AI-2. A comparative genomic and phylogenetic analysis of 138 genomes of bacteria, archaea, and eukaryotes found that "the LuxS enzyme required for AI-2 synthesis is widespread in bacteria, while the periplasmic binding protein LuxP is present only in Vibrio strains," leading to the conclusion that either "other organisms may use components different from the AI-2 signal transduction system of Vibrio strains to sense the signal of AI-2 or they do not have such a quorum sensing system at all." Vibrio species utilize Qrr RNAs, small non-coding RNAs, that are activated by these autoinducers to target cell density master regulators. Farnesol is used by the fungus Candida albicans as a quorum sensing molecule that inhibits filamentation.

A database of quorum-sensing peptides is available under the name Quorumpeps.

Certain bacteria can produce enzymes called lactonases that can target and inactivate AHLs. Researchers have developed novel molecules which block the signalling receptors of bacteria ("Quorum quenching"). mBTL is a compound that has been shown to inhibit quorum sensing and decrease the amount of cell death by a significant amount. Additionally, researchers are also examining the role of natural compounds (such as caffeine) as potential quorum sensing inhibitors. Research in this area has been promising and could lead to the development of natural compounds as effective therapeutics.

=== Evolution ===
==== Sequence analysis ====
The majority of quorum sensing systems that fall under the "two-gene" (an autoinducer synthase coupled with a receptor molecule) paradigm as defined by the Vibrio fischeri system occur in the gram-negative Pseudomonadota. A comparison between the Pseudomonadota phylogeny as generated by 16S ribosomal RNA sequences and phylogenies of LuxI-, LuxR-, or LuxS-homologs shows a notably high level of global similarity. Overall, the quorum sensing genes seem to have diverged along with the Pseudomonadota phylum as a whole. This indicates that these quorum sensing systems are quite ancient, and arose very early in the Pseudomonadota lineage.

LuxI and LuxR have coevolved through a long history of horizontal gene transfer (HGT) events. An early study reconciling their gene trees with the rRNA tree suggested frequent HGT events for both LuxI and LuxR, indicating that they are horizontally transferred together and coevolve due to their functional dependency. Similarly, in QS systems in bacteria associated with Populus deltoides, the gene trees for luxI and luxR show high topological similarity, indicating coevolution of cognate pairs. In addition to horizontal transfer of complete LuxI/LuxR-type QS systems, many Proteobacteria genomes exhibit an excess of LuxR genes or cases with only LuxR but not LuxI, acquired from different sources via HGT. Due to the frequent transfer of functional pairs of homologs (i.e., LuxI/LuxR-type systems from multiple independent sources), it is possible that the regulatory hierarchy formed by the LuxI/LuxR and RhlR-RhlI systems is a result of sequential integration of circuits obtained from different sources, due to interactions between multiple homologs. Interestingly, LuxI genes have likely undergone horizontal gene transfer from Proteobacteria to other lineages, as they have been detected in Nitrospira lineage II.

In quorum sensing genes of Gammaproteobacteria, which includes Pseudomonas aeruginosa and Escherichia coli, the LuxI/LuxR genes form a functional pair, with LuxI as the auto-inducer synthase and LuxR as the receptor. Gammaproteobacteria are unique in possessing quorum sensing genes, which, although functionally similar to the LuxI/LuxR genes, have a markedly divergent sequence. This family of quorum-sensing homologs may have arisen in the Gammaproteobacteria ancestor, although the cause of their extreme sequence divergence yet maintenance of functional similarity has yet to be explained. In addition, species that employ multiple discrete quorum sensing systems are almost all members of the Gammaproteobacteria, and evidence of horizontal transfer of quorum sensing genes is most evident in this class.

==== Interaction of quorum-sensing molecules with mammalian cells and its medical applications ====
Next to the potential antimicrobial functionality, quorum-sensing derived molecules, especially the peptides, are being investigated for their use in other therapeutic domains as well, including immunology, central nervous system disorders and oncology. Quorum-sensing peptides have been demonstrated to interact with cancer cells, as well as to permeate the blood–brain barrier reaching the brain parenchyma.

=== Role of quorum sensing in biofilm development ===
Quorum sensing (QS) is used by bacteria to form biofilms. Quorum sensing is used by bacteria to form biofilms because the process determines if the minimum number of bacteria necessary for biofilm formation are present. The criteria to form a biofilm is dependent on a certain density of bacteria rather than a certain number of bacteria being present. When aggregated in high enough densities, some bacteria may form biofilms to protect themselves from biotic or abiotic threats. Quorum sensing is used by both Gram-positive and Gram-negative bacteria because it aids cellular reproduction. Once in a biofilm, bacteria can communicate with other bacteria of the same species. Bacteria can also communicate with other species of bacteria. This communication is enabled through autoinducers used by the bacteria.

Additionally, certain responses can be generated by the host organism in response to the certain bacterial autoinducers. Despite the fact that specific bacterial quorum sensing systems are different, for example the target genes, signal relay mechanisms, and chemical signals used between bacteria, the ability to coordinate gene expression for a specific species of bacteria remains the same. This ability alludes to the larger idea that bacteria have potential to become a multicellular bacterial body.

Secondly, biofilms may also serve to transport nutrients into the microbial community or transport toxins out by means of channels that permeate the extracellular polymeric matrix (like cellulose) that holds the cells together. Finally, biofilms are an ideal environment for horizontal gene transfer through either conjugation or environmental DNA (eDNA) that exists in the biofilm matrix.

The process of biofilm development is often triggered by environmental signals, and bacteria are proven to require flagella to successfully approach a surface, adhere to it, and form the biofilm. As cells either replicate or aggregate in a location, the concentration of autoinducers outside of the cells increases until a critical mass threshold is reached. At this point, it is energetically unfavorable for intracellular autoinducers to leave the cell and they bind to receptors and trigger a signaling cascade to initiate gene expression and begin secreting an extracellular polysaccharide to encase themselves inside.

One modern method of preventing biofilm development without the use of antibiotics is with anti-QS substances, such (naringenin, taxifolin, etc.) that can be utilized as alternative form of therapy against bacterial virulence.

== Archaea ==
=== Examples ===
==== Methanosaeta harundinacea 6Ac ====
Methanosaeta harundinacea 6Ac, a methanogenic archaeon, produces carboxylated acyl homoserine lactone compounds that facilitate the transition from growth as short cells to growth as filaments.

== Viruses ==
A mechanism involving arbitrium has recently been described in bacteriophages infecting several Bacillus species. The viruses communicate with each other to ascertain their own density compared to potential hosts. They use this information to decide whether to enter a lytic or lysogenic life-cycle. This decision is crucial as it affects their replication strategy and potential to spread within the host population, optimizing their survival and proliferation under varying environmental conditions. This communication mechanism enables a coordinated infection strategy, significantly enhancing the efficiency of phage proliferation. By synchronizing their life cycles, bacteriophages can maximize their impact on the host population, potentially leading to more effective control of bacterial densities.

== Plants ==
QS is important to plant-pathogen interactions, and their study has also contributed to the QS field more generally. The first X-ray crystallography results for some of the key proteins were those of Pantoea stewartii subsp. stewartii in maize/corn and Agrobacterium tumefaciens, a crop pathogen with a wider range of hosts. These interactions are facilitated by quorum-sensing molecules and play a major role in maintaining the pathogenicity of bacteria towards other hosts, such as humans. This mechanism can be understood by looking at the effects of N-Acyl homoserine lactone (AHL), one of the quorum sensing-signaling molecules in gram-negative bacteria, on plants. The model organism used is Arabidopsis thaliana. Further insights reveal that AHLs influence plant immune responses and can alter plant hormone levels, thereby affecting plant growth and susceptibility to infection. Understanding these dynamics is crucial for developing innovative strategies to combat plant diseases and improve agricultural productivity. Researchers have also noted that certain plants can degrade these signaling molecules, potentially as a defensive strategy to disrupt bacterial communication. This interplay between bacterial signaling and plant responses suggests a complex co-evolutionary relationship that could be exploited to enhance crop resistance to bacterial pathogens.

The role of AHLs having long carbon-chains (C12, C14), which have an unknown receptor mechanism, is less well understood than AHLs having short carbon-chains (C4, C6, C8), which are perceived by the G protein-coupled receptor. A phenomenon called "AHL priming", which is a dependent signalling pathway, enhanced our knowledge of long-chain AHLs. The role of quorum-sensing molecules was better explained according to three categories: host physiology–based impact of quorum sensing molecules; ecological effects; and cellular signaling. Calcium signalling and calmodulin have a large role in short-chain AHLs' response in Arabidopsis. Research was also conducted on barley and the crop called yam bean (Pachyrhizus erosus) that reveals the AHLs determining the detoxification enzymes called GST were found less in yam bean.

Quorum sensing-based regulatory systems are necessary to plant-disease-causing bacteria. Looking towards developing new strategies based on plant-associated microbiomes, the aim of further study is to improve the quantity and quality of the food supply. Further research into this inter-kingdom communication also enhances the possibility of learning about quorum sensing in humans. This exploration could open new avenues for managing microbial communities in agricultural settings, potentially leading to the development of more sustainable farming practices that leverage natural microbial processes to boost crop resilience and productivity.

== Social insects ==
Social insect colonies are an excellent example of a decentralized system, because no individual is in charge of directing or making decisions for the colony. Several groups of social insects have been shown to use quorum sensing in a process that resembles collective decision-making.

=== Examples ===
==== Ants ====
Colonies of the ant Temnothorax albipennis nest in small crevices between rocks. When the rocks shift and the nest is broken up, these ants must quickly choose a new nest to move into. During the first phase of the decision-making process, a small portion of the workers leave the destroyed nest and search for new crevices. When one of these scout ants finds a potential nest, she assesses the quality of the crevice based on a variety of factors including the size of the interior, the number of openings (based on light level), and the presence or absence of dead ants. The worker then returns to the destroyed nest, where she waits for a short period before recruiting other workers to follow her to the nest that she has found, using a process called tandem running. The waiting period is inversely related to the quality of the site; for instance, a worker that has found a poor site will wait longer than a worker that encountered a good site. As the new recruits visit the potential nest site and make their own assessment of its quality, the number of ants visiting the crevice increases. During this stage, ants may be visiting many different potential nests. However, because of the differences in the waiting period, the number of ants in the best nest will tend to increase at the greatest rate. Eventually, the ants in this nest will sense that the rate at which they encounter other ants has exceeded a particular threshold, indicating that the quorum number has been reached. Once the ants sense a quorum, they return to the destroyed nest and begin rapidly carrying the brood, queen, and fellow workers to the new nest. Scouts that are still tandem-running to other potential sites are also recruited to the new nest, and the entire colony moves. Thus, although no single worker may have visited and compared all of the available options, quorum sensing enables the colony as a whole to quickly make good decisions about where to move.

==== Honey bees ====
Honey bees (Apis mellifera) also use quorum sensing to make decisions about new nest sites. Large colonies reproduce through a process called swarming, in which the queen leaves the hive with a portion of the workers to form a new nest elsewhere. After leaving the nest, the workers form a swarm that hangs from a branch or overhanging structure. This swarm persists during the decision-making phase until a new nest site is chosen.

The quorum sensing process in honey bees is similar to the method used by Temnothorax ants in several ways. A small portion of the workers leave the swarm to search out new nest sites, and each worker assesses the quality of the cavity it finds. The worker then returns to the swarm and recruits other workers to her cavity using the honey bee waggle dance. However, instead of using a time delay, the number of dance repetitions the worker performs is dependent on the quality of the site. Workers that found poor nests stop dancing sooner, and can, therefore, be recruited to the better sites. Once the visitors to a new site sense that a quorum number (usually 10–20 bees) has been reached, they return to the swarm and begin using a new recruitment method called piping. This vibration signal causes the swarm to take off and fly to the new nest location. In an experimental test, this decision-making process enabled honey bee swarms to choose the best nest site in four out of five trials.

== Fish ==
Quorum sensing can function as a collective decision-making process in fish schools. A quorum response has been defined as "a steep increase in the probability of group members performing a given behaviour once a threshold minimum number of their group mates already performing that behaviour is exceeded". A recent investigation showed that small groups of fish used consensus decision-making when deciding which fish model to follow. The fish did this by a simple quorum rule such that individuals watched the decisions of others before making their own decisions. This technique generally resulted in the 'correct' decision but occasionally cascaded into the 'incorrect' decision. In addition, as the group size increased, the fish made more accurate decisions in following the more attractive fish model. Consensus decision-making, a form of collective intelligence, thus effectively uses information from multiple sources to generally reach the correct conclusion. Such behaviour has also been demonstrated in the shoaling behaviour of threespine sticklebacks.

== Quorum quenching ==
Quorum quenching is the process of preventing quorum sensing by disrupting signalling. This is achieved by inactivating signalling enzymes, by introducing molecules that mimic signalling molecules and block their receptors, by degrading signalling molecules themselves, or by a modification of the quorum sensing signals due to an enzyme activity.

=== Inhibition ===
Closantel and triclosan are known inhibitors of quorum sensing enzymes. Closantel induces aggregation of the histidine kinase sensor in two-component signalling. The latter disrupts the synthesis of a class of signalling molecules known as N-acyl homoserine lactones (AHLs) by blocking the enoyl-acyl carrier protein (ACP) reductase.

=== Mimicry ===
Two groups of well-known mimicking molecules include halogenated furanones, which mimic AHL molecules, and synthetic Al peptides (AIPs), which mimic naturally occurring AIPs. These groups inhibit receptors from binding substrate or decrease the concentration of receptors in the cell. Furanones have also been found to act on AHL-dependant transcriptional activity, whereby the half life of the autoinducer-binding LuxR protein is significantly shortened.

=== Degradation ===
Recently, a well-studied quorum quenching bacterial strain (KM1S) was isolated and its AHL degradation kinetics were studied using rapid resolution liquid chromatography (RRLC). RRLC efficiently separates components of a mixture to a high degree of sensitivity, based on their affinities for different liquid phases. It was found that the genome of this strain encoded an inactivation enzyme with distinct motifs targeting the degradation of AHLs.

=== Modifications ===
As mentioned before, N-acyl-homoserine lactones (AHL) are the quorum sensing signaling molecules of the gram-negative bacteria. However, these molecules may have different functional groups on their acyl chain, and also a different length of acyl chain. Therefore, there exist many different AHL signaling molecules, for example, 3-oxododecanoyl-L-homoserine lactone (3OC12-HSL) or 3-hydroxydodecanoyl-L-homoserine lactone (3OHC12-HSL). The modification of those quorum sensing (QS) signaling molecules is another sort of quorum quenching. This can be carried out by an oxidoreductase activity. As an example, we will discuss the interaction between a host, Hydra vulgaris, and the main colonizer of its epithelial cell surfaces, Curvibacter spp. Those bacteria produce 3-oxo-HSL quorum sensing molecules. However, the oxidoreductase activity of the polyp Hydra is able to modify the 3-oxo-HSL into their 3-hydroxy-HSL counterparts. We can characterize this as quorum quenching since there is an interference with quorum sensing molecules. In this case, the outcomes differ from simple QS inactivation: the host modification results in a phenotypic switch of Curvibacter, which modifies its ability to colonize the epithelial cell surfaces of H. vulgaris.

=== Applications ===
Applications of quorum quenching that have been exploited by humans include the use of AHL-degrading bacteria in aquacultures to limit the spread of diseases in aquatic populations of fish, mollusks and crustaceans. This technique has also been translated to agriculture, to restrict the spread of pathogenic bacteria that use quorum sensing in plants. Anti-biofouling is another process that exploits quorum quenching bacteria to mediate the dissociation of unwanted biofilms aggregating on wet surfaces, such as medical devices, transportation infrastructure and water systems. Quorum quenching is recently studied for the control of fouling and emerging contaminants in electro membrane bioreactors (eMBRs) for the advanced treatment of wastewater. Extracts of several traditional medicinal herbs display quorum quenching activity, and have potential antibacterial applications.

== Synthetic biology ==
Quorum sensing has been engineered using synthetic biological circuits in different systems. Examples include rewiring the AHL components to toxic genes to control population size in bacteria; and constructing an auxin-based system to control population density in mammalian cells. Synthetic quorum sensing circuits have been proposed to enable applications like controlling biofilms or enabling drug delivery. Quorum sensing based genetic circuits have been used to convert AI-2 signals to AI-1 and then subsequently use the AI-1 signal to alter bacterial growth rate, thereby changing the composition of a consortium.

Advancements continue to be made in the field of synthetic biology, especially in the study of endocrine and paracrine signaling mechanisms and the numerous ways in which bacteria record domestic and foreign cell numbers. The modulation of gene expression in response to oscillations in cell population density is possible through the QS techniques regulating bacterial communication natural and artificial cultures. Additionally, intra- and inter-species cell-to-cell communication occurs and is regulated by quorum sensing systems. There is also an increasing amount of data that demonstrates that autoinducer signals elicit specific responses from eukaryotic hosts.

== Computing and robotics ==
Quorum sensing can be a useful tool for improving the function of self-organizing networks such as the SECOAS (Self-Organizing Collegiate Sensor) environmental monitoring system. In this system, individual nodes sense that there is a population of other nodes with similar data to report. The population then nominates just one node to report the data, resulting in power savings. Ad hoc wireless networks can also benefit from quorum sensing, by allowing the system to detect and respond to network conditions.

Quorum sensing can also be used to coordinate the behavior of autonomous robot swarms. Using a process similar to that used by Temnothorax ants, robots can make rapid group decisions without the direction of a controller.

Despite recent advancements, the true nature of these back-and-forth conversations remains a mystery, and further rigorous research targeting inter- and intra- species communication is still necessary to maximize knowledge of quorum sensing and its potential to improve research and treatments of cancer and bacterial diseases. The code to understanding these complex bacterial languages is to decipher the impact of the words.

== See also ==
- Cell signaling
- Collective behavior
- Diffusible signal factor
- Interspecies quorum sensing
- Microbial intelligence
- Pheromone
- Signal transduction
- Swarm intelligence
