= Paper marbling =

Method of aqueous surface design

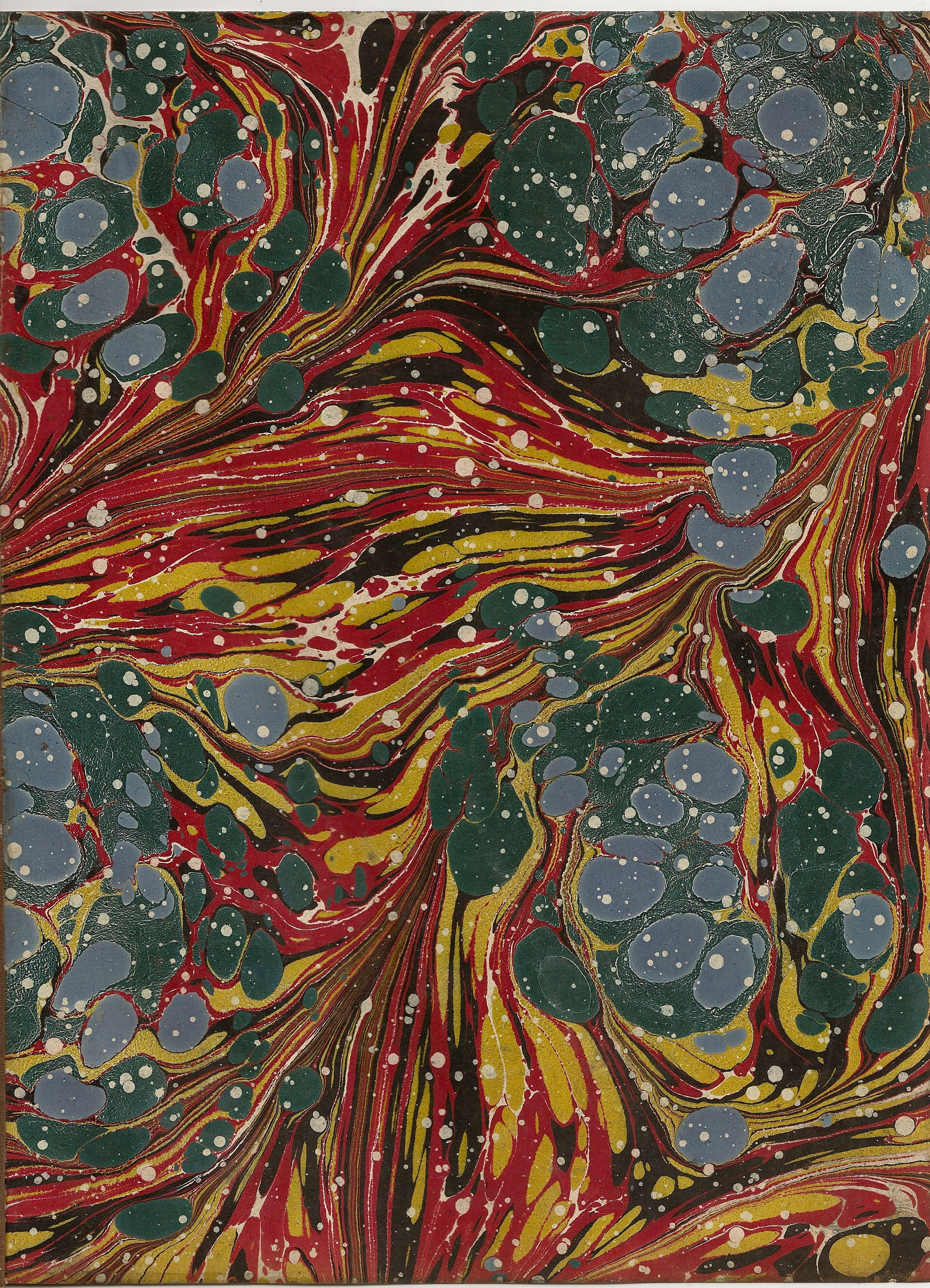
Endpaper from a book published in Scotland in 1842. Encyclopædia Britannica, 7th edition

Paper marbling is a method of aqueous surface design, which can produce patterns similar to smooth marble or other kinds of stone. The patterns are the result of color floated on either plain water or a viscous solution known as size, and then carefully transferred to an absorbent surface, such as paper or fabric. Through several centuries, people have applied marbled materials to a variety of surfaces. It is often employed as a writing surface for calligraphy and in bookbinding for book covers and endpapers, and it appears in stationery such as file folders. Part of its appeal is that each print is a unique monotype.

== Procedure ==
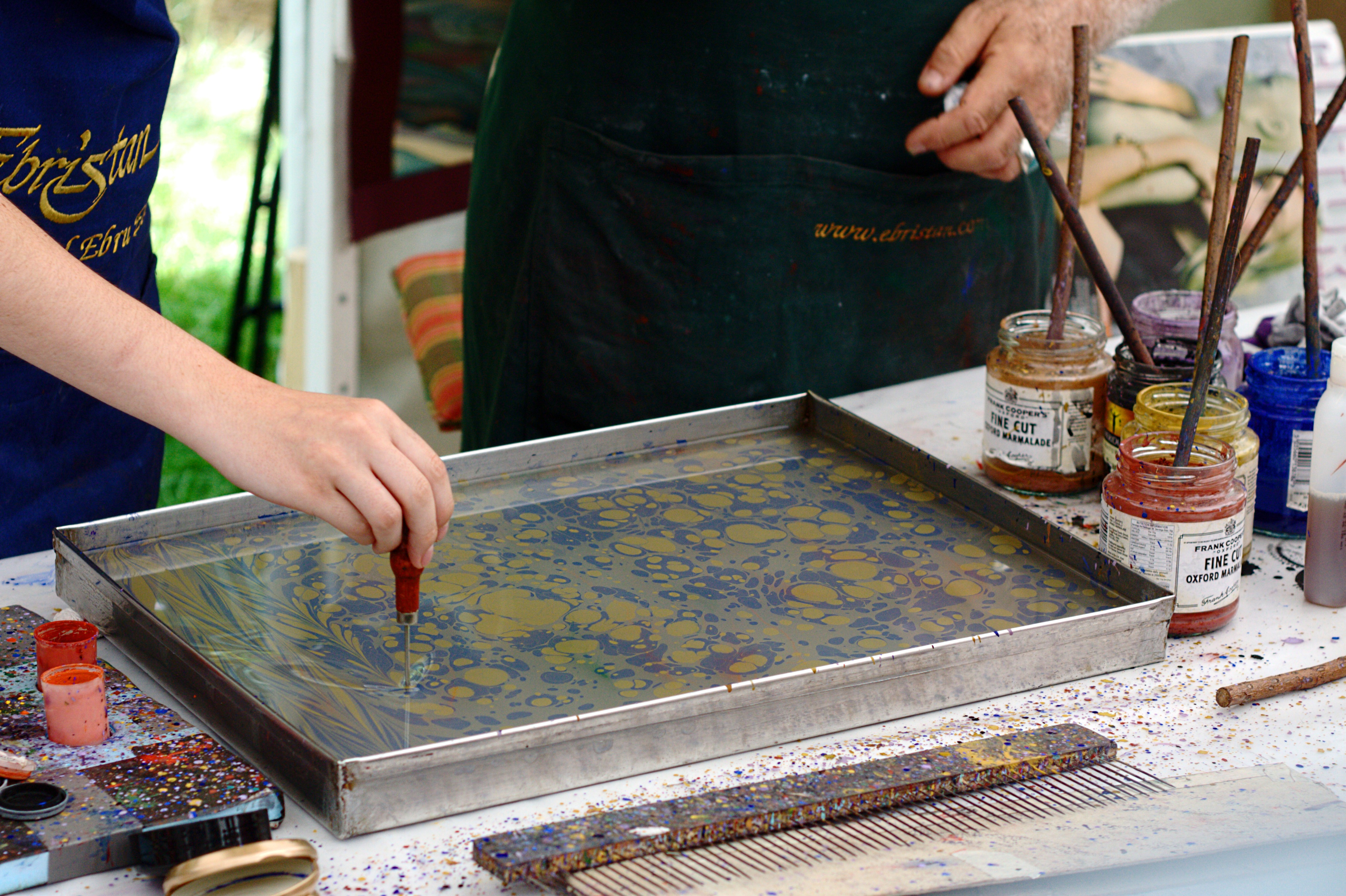
Water-based paints in a tank of carrageenan size being prepared for marbling.

There are several methods for making marbled papers. A shallow tray is filled with water, and various kinds of ink or paint colors are carefully applied to the surface with an ink brush. Various additives or surfactant chemicals are used to help float the colors. A drop of "negative" color made of plain water with the addition of surfactant is used to drive the drop of color into a ring. The process is repeated until the surface of the water is covered with concentric rings. The floating colors are then carefully manipulated either by blowing on them directly or through a straw, fanning the colors, or carefully using a human hair to stir the colors.

In the 19th century, the Kyoto-based Japanese suminagashi master Tokutaro Yagi developed an alternative method that employed a split piece of bamboo to gently stir the colors, resulting in concentric spiral designs. A sheet of washi paper is then carefully laid onto the water surface to capture the floating design. The paper, which is often made of kozo (paper mulberry), must be unsized and strong enough to withstand being immersed in water without tearing.

Another method of marbling more familiar to Europeans and Americans is made on the surface of a viscous mucilage, known as size or sizing in English. While this method is often referred to as "Turkish marbling" in English and called ebru in modern Turkish, ethnic Turkic peoples were not the only practitioners of the art, as Persian, Tajiks, and people of Indian origin also made these papers. The use of the term Turkish by Europeans is most likely due to both the fact that many first encountered the art in Istanbul, as well as essentialist references to all Muslims as Turks, much as Europeans were referred to as Firengi in Turkish and Persian, which literally means Frankish.

Historic forms of marbling used both organic and inorganic pigments mixed with water for colors, and sizes were traditionally made from gum tragacanth (Astragalus spp.), gum karaya, guar gum, fenugreek (Trigonella foenum-graecum), fleabane, linseed, and psyllium. Since the late 19th century, a boiled extract of the carrageenan-rich alga known as Irish moss (Chondrus crispus), has been employed for sizing. Today, many marblers use powdered carrageenan extracted from various seaweeds. Another plant-derived mucilage is made from sodium alginate. In recent years, a synthetic size made from hydroxypropyl methylcellulose, a common ingredient in instant wallpaper paste, is often used as a size for floating acrylic and oil paints.

In the size-based method, colors made from pigments are mixed with a surfactant such as ox gall. Sometimes, oil or turpentine may be added to a color, to achieve special effects. The colors are then spattered or dropped onto the size, one color after another until there is a dense pattern of several colors. Straw from the broom corn was used to make a kind of whisk for sprinkling the paint, or horsehair to create a kind of drop-brush. Each successive layer of pigment spreads slightly less than the last, and the colors may require additional surfactant to float and uniformly expand. Once the colors are laid down, various tools and implements such as rakes, combs, and styluses are often used in a series of movements to create more intricate designs.

Cobb paper or cloth is often mordanted beforehand with aluminium sulfate (alum) and gently laid onto the floating colors (although methods such as Turkish ebru and Japanese suminagashi do not require mordanting). The colors are thereby transferred and adhered to the surface of the paper or material. The paper or material is then carefully lifted off the size and hung up to dry. Some marblers gently drag the paper over a rod to draw off the excess size. If necessary, excess bleeding colors and sizing can be rinsed off, and then the paper or fabric is allowed to dry. After the print is made, any color residues remaining on the size are carefully skimmed off of the surface, in order to clear it before starting a new pattern.

Contemporary marblers employ a variety of modern materials, some in place of or in combination with the more traditional ones. A wide variety of colors are used today in place of the historic pigment colors. Plastic broom straw can be used instead of broom corn, as well as bamboo sticks, plastic pipettes, and eye droppers to drop the colors on the surface of the size. Ox gall is still commonly used as a surfactant for watercolors and gouache, but synthetic surfactants are used in conjunction with acrylic, PVA, and oil-based paints.

== History in East Asia ==
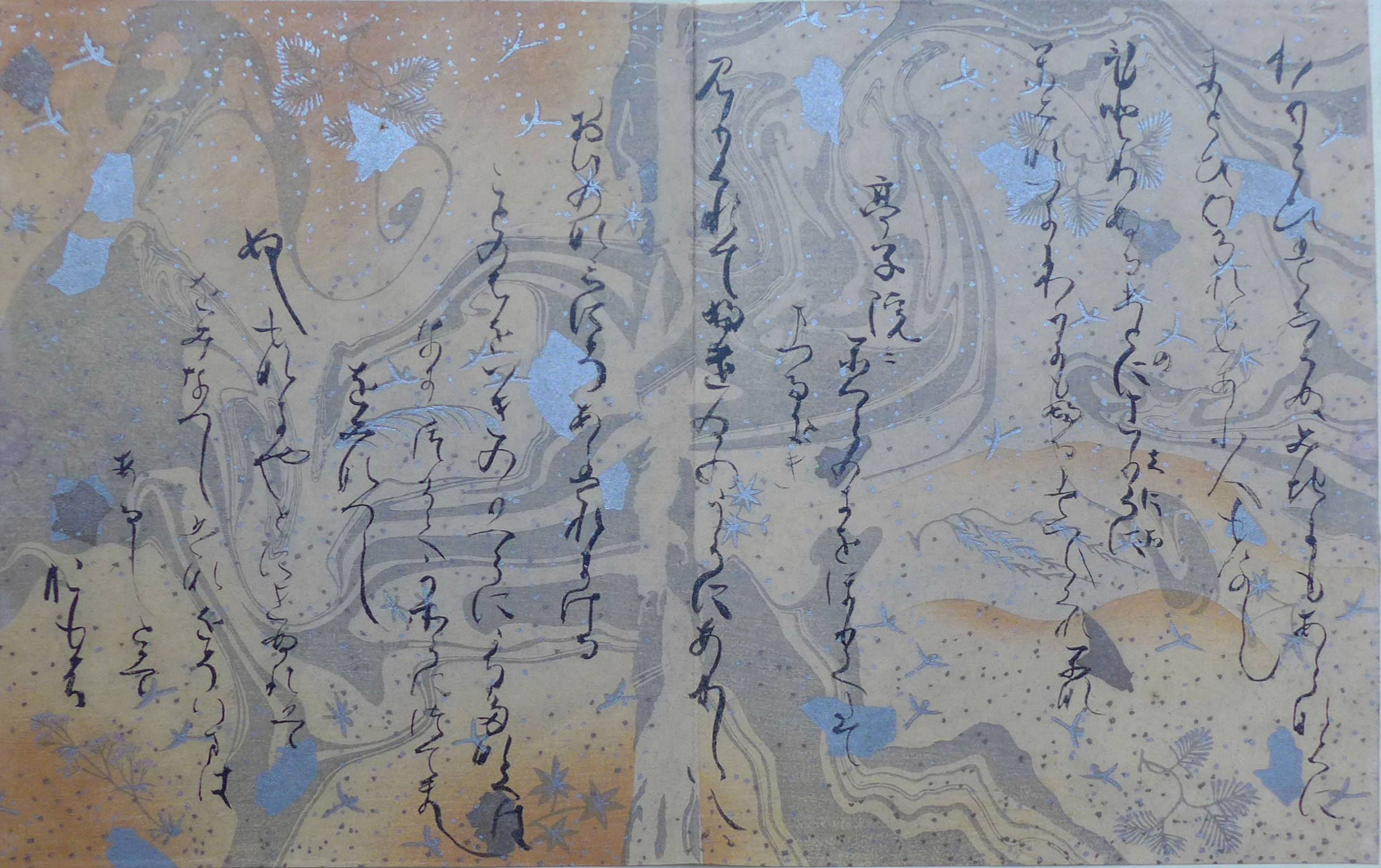
Two pages of waka poems by Ōshikōchi Mitsune (859?–925?). 20 cm height, 32 cm wide. Silver, Gold, Color, and ink on suminagashi paper. From a copy of the Sanjurokunin Kashu or "Thirty-Six Immortal Poets" kept in the Hongan-ji Temple, Kyoto. This multi-volume manuscript, which contains the oldest examples of marbled paper known today, was presented to the Emperor Shirakawa on his sixtieth birthday in 1112 CE (Narita, 14 and Chambers, 13–16).

An intriguing reference which some think may be a form of marbling is found in a compilation completed in 986 CE entitled Four Treasures of the Scholar's Study (文房四譜; pinyin: Wén Fáng Sì Pǔ) or edited by the 10th century scholar-official Su Yijian (958–996 CE). This compilation contains information on inkstick, inkstone, ink brush, and paper in China, which are collectively called the four treasures of the study. The text mentions a kind of decorative paper called liúshā jiān (流沙箋) meaning 'drifting-sand' or 'flowing-sand notepaper' that was made in what is now the region of Sichuan (Su 4: 7a–8a).

This paper was made by dragging a piece of paper through a fermented flour paste mixed with various colors, creating a free and irregular design. A second type was made with a paste prepared from honey locust pods, mixed with croton oil, and thinned with water. Presumably, both black and colored inks were employed. Ginger, possibly in the form of an oil or extract, was used to disperse the colors, or “scatter” them, according to the interpretation given by T.H. Tsien. The colors were said to gather together when a hair-brush was beaten over the design, as dandruff particles was applied to the design by beating a hairbrush over top. The finished designs, which were thought to resemble human figures, clouds, or flying birds, were then transferred to the surface of a sheet of paper. An example of paper decorated with floating ink has never been found in China. Whether or not the above methods employed floating colors remains to be determined (Tsien 94–5).

Su Yijian was an Imperial scholar-official and served as the chief of the Hanlin Academy from about 985–993 CE. He compiled the work from a wide variety of earlier sources and was familiar with the subject, given his profession. It is uncertain how personally acquainted he was with the various methods for making decorative papers that he compiled. He most likely reported information given to him, without having a full understanding of the methods used. His original sources may have predated him by several centuries. Not only is it necessary to identify the original source to attribute a firm date for the information, but also the account remains uncorroborated due to a lack of any surviving physical evidence of marbling in Chinese manuscripts.

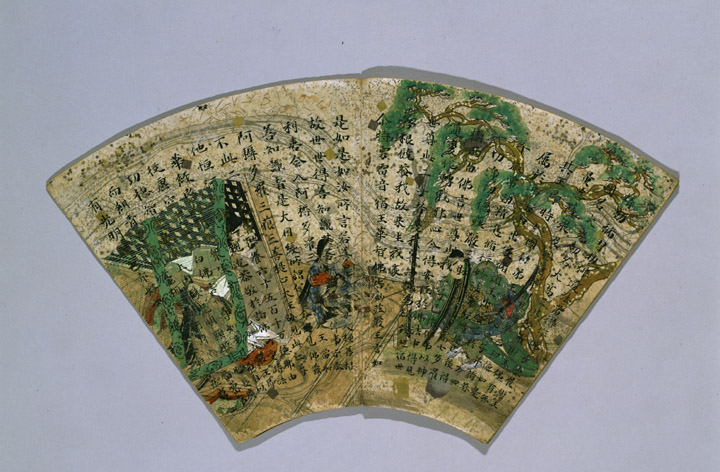
An example of suminagashi paper used as an element in traditional ink wash painting. From the National Treasure Fan-shaped album of the Hokekyō Sutra (Lotus Sutra), Heian period 12th c. CE, currently kept in the Shitennō-ji Temple in Osaka

In contrast, suminagashi (墨流し), which means 'floating ink' in Japanese, appears to be the earliest form of marbling during the 12th-century Sanjuurokuninshuu (三十六人集), located in Nishihonganji (西本願寺), Kyoto. Author Einen Miura states that the oldest reference to suminagashi papers are in the waka poems of Shigeharu (825–880 CE), a son of the famed Heian-era poet Narihira (Muira 14) in the Kokin Wakashū, but the verse has not been identified and even if found, it may be spurious. Various claims have been made regarding the origins of suminagashi. Some think that may have derived from an early form of ink divination (encromancy). Another theory is that the process may have derived from a form of popular entertainment at the time, in which a freshly painted Sumi painting was immersed into water, and the ink slowly dispersed from the paper and rose to the surface, forming curious designs, but no physical evidence supporting these allegations has ever been identified.

According to legend, Jizemon Hiroba is credited as the inventor of suminagashi. It is said that he felt divinely inspired to make suminagashi paper after he offered spiritual devotions at the Kasuga Shrine in Nara Prefecture. He then wandered the country looking for the best water with which to make his papers. He arrived in Echizen, Fukui Prefecture where he found the water especially conducive to making suminagashi. He settled there, and his family carried on with the tradition to this day. The Hiroba family claims to have made this form of marbled paper since 1151 CE for 55 generations (Narita, 14).

== History in the Islamic world ==
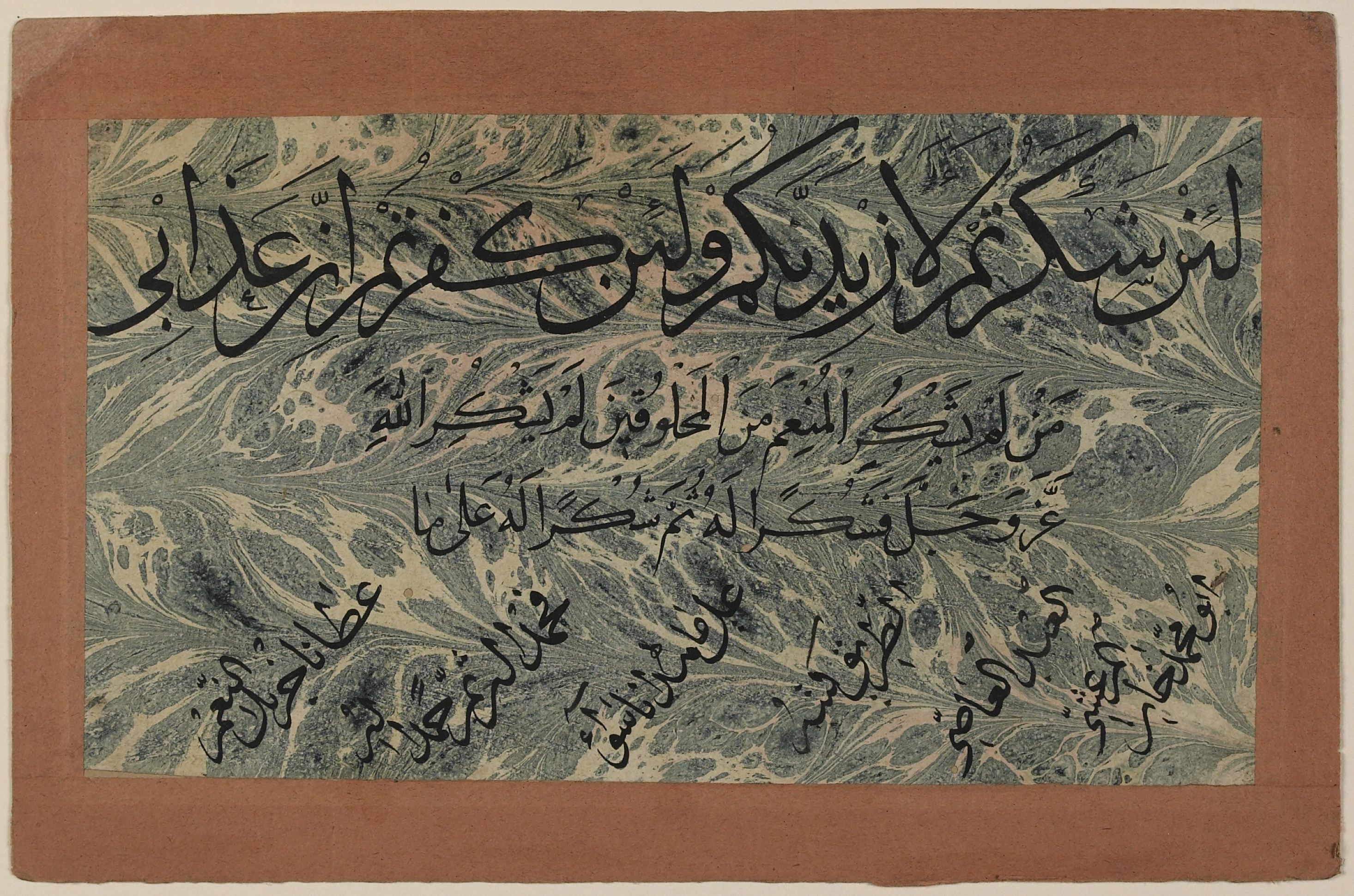
This calligraphic panel features a verse from the Qur'an (14:7), and is typical of compositions written upon marbled paper produced after the 16th century in Central Asia, Iran, India, and Turkey.

The method of floating colors on the surface of mucilaginous sizing is thought to have emerged in the regions of Greater Iran and Central Asia by the late 15th century. It may have first appeared during the end of the Timurid dynasty, whose final capital was in the city of Herat, located in Afghanistan today. Other sources suggest it emerged during the subsequent Shaybanid dynasty, in the cities of Samarqand or Bukhara, in what is now modern Uzbekistan. Whether or not this method was somehow related to earlier Chinese or Japanese methods mentioned above has never been concretely proven. Several Persian historical accounts refer to (كاغذ ابرى) kāghaẕ-e abrī, often shortened to abrī (ابرى). Annemarie Schimmel translated this term as 'clouded paper' in English. While Sami Frashëri claimed in his Kamus-ı Türki, that the term was "more properly derived from the Chagatai word ebre" (ابره); however, he did not reference any source to support this assertion. In contrast, most historical Persian, Turkish, and Urdu texts refer to the paper as abrī alone. Today in Turkey, the art is commonly known as ebru, a cognate of the term abrī first documented in the 19th century. In Iran, many now employ a variant term, abr-o-bâd (ابرو باد), meaning 'cloud and wind' for a modern method made with oil colors.

The art first emerged and evolved during the long 16th century in Persia and Transoxiana then spread to the Ottoman Turkey, as well as Mughal and the Deccan Sultanates in India. Within these regions, various methods emerged in which colors were made to float on the surface of a bath of viscous liquid mucilage or size, made from various plants including fenugreek seed, onion, gum tragacanth (astragalus) and salep (the roots of Orchis mascula), among others.

Lady Carrying a Peacock. Marbled paper work made in Bijapur, c. 1660. Free Library of Philadelphia

A pair of leaves purported to be the earliest examples of this paper, preserved in the Kronos collection, bears rudimentary droplet-motifs. One of the sheets bears an accession notation on the reverse stating "note: these rare abris ..." (یادداشت این ابریهای نادره ...) and adds that it was "among the gifts from Iran" to the royal library of Ghiyath Shah, the ruler of the Malwa Sultanate, dated Hijri year 1 Dhu al-Hijjah 901/11 August 1496 of the Common Era.

"Emaciated Horse and Rider". An example of the 17th century miniature paintings made using a collage of marbled papers in the Deccan Sultanates

Approximately a century later, a technically advanced approach using finely prepared mineral and organic pigments and combs to manipulate the floating colors resulted in comparatively elaborate, intricate, and mesmerizing overall designs. Both literary and physical evidence suggests that before 1600, a Safavid-era émigré to India named Muḥammad Ṭāhir developed many of these innovations. Later that century, Indian marblers combined the abri technique with stencil and resist masking methods to create miniature paintings, attributed to the Deccan sultanates and especially the city of Bijapur in particular, during the Adil Shahi dynasty in the 17th century.

The earliest examples of Ottoman marbled paper may be the margins attached to a cut paper découpage manuscript of the Hâlnâma (حالنامه) by the poet Arifi (popularly known as the Gû-yi Çevgân ['Ball and Polo-stick']) completed by Mehmed bin Gazanfer in 1539–40. Recipes ascribed to one early master by the name of Shebek, appear posthumously in the earliest, anonymously compiled Ottoman miscellany on the art known as the Tertîb-i Risâle-'i Ebrî (ترتیبِ رسالۀ ابری, 'An Arrangement of a Treatise on Ebrî'), dated on the basis of internal evidence to after 1615. Many in Turkey attribute another famous 18th-century master Hatip Mehmed Efendi (died 1773) with developing motif and perhaps early floral designs and refer to them as "Hatip" designs.

The current Turkish tradition of ebru dates to the mid-19th century, with a series of masters associated with a branch of the Naqshbandi Sufi order based at what is known as the Özbekler Tekkesi (Lodge of the Uzbeks), located in Sultantepe, near Üsküdar. The founder of this line, Sadık Effendi (died 1846) allegedly first learned the art in Bukhara and brought it to Istanbul, then taught it to his sons Edhem and Salıh. Based upon this later practice, many Turkish marblers assert that Sufis practiced the art for centuries; however, little evidence supports this claim. Sadık's son Edhem Effendi (died 1904) manufactured papers as a kind of cottage industry for the tekke, to supply Istanbul's burgeoning printing industry with the paper, purportedly tied into bundles and sold by weight. Many of his papers feature neftli designs made with turpentine, analogous to what English-speaking marblers refer to as the stormont pattern.

The premier student of Edhem Efendi, Necmeddin Okyay (1885–1976), first taught the art at the Fine Arts Academy in Istanbul. He famously innovated elaborate floral designs, in addition to yazılı ebru, a method of writing traditional calligraphy using a gum arabic resist masking applied before marbling the sheet. Okyay's premier student, Mustafa Düzgünman (1920–1990), taught many contemporary marblers in Turkey today. He codified the traditional repertoire of patterns, to which he only added a floral daisy design, after the manner of his teacher.

== History in Europe ==
In the 17th century, European travelers to the Middle East collected examples of these papers and bound them into album amicorum, which literally means "album of friends" in Latin, and is a forerunner of the modern autograph album. Eventually, the technique for making the papers reached Europe, where they became a popular covering material not only for book covers and end-papers, but also for lining chests, drawers, and bookshelves. By the late 17th century, Europeans also started to marble the edges of books.

The methods of marbling attracted the curiosity of intellectuals, philosophers, and scientists. Gerhard ter Brugghen published the earliest European technical account, written in Dutch, in his Verlichtery kunst-boeck in Amsterdam in 1616, while the first German account was written by Daniel Schwenter, published posthumously in his Delicæ Physico-Mathematicæ in 1671 (Benson, "Curious Colors", 284; Wolfe, 16). Athanasius Kircher published a Latin account in Ars Magna Lucis et Umbræ in Rome in 1646, widely disseminated knowledge of the art throughout Europe. Denis Diderot and Jean le Rond d'Alembert published a thorough overview of the art with illustrations of marblers at work together with images of the tools of the trade in their Encyclopédie.

Elena Laura Jakobi is responsible for a conceptual history study of the terms and variants used to describe marbled paper between 1550 and 1800. The genesis, development, and differentiation of the terms are documented in German, Dutch, French, Italian, and Latin using 109 written sources.

In 1695, the Bank of England employed partially marbled papers banknotes for several weeks until it discovered that William Chaloner had successfully forged similar notes (Benson, "Curious Colors", 289–294). Nevertheless, the Bank continued to issue partially marbled cheques until the 1810s (Benson, "Curious Colors", 301–302). In 1731, English marbler Samuel Pope obtained a patent for security marbling, claiming that he invented the process, then sued his competitors for infringement; however, those he accused exposed him for patent fraud (Benson, "Curious Colors", 294–301). Benjamin Franklin obtained English marbled security papers employed for printing Continental Congress $20 banknote in 1775, as well as promissory notes to support the American Revolutionary War, threepence notes issued during the Copper Panic of 1789, as well as his own personal cheques (Benson, "Curious Colors", 302–307).

== Nineteenth century ==
After English marbler Charles Woolnough published his The Art of Marbling (1853), the art production increased in the 19th century. In it, he describes how he adapted a method of marbling onto book cloth, which he exhibited at the Crystal Palace Exhibition in 1851. (Wolfe, 79) Josef Halfer, a bookbinder of German origin, who lived in Budakeszi, Hungary, conducted extensive experiments and devised further innovations, chiefly by adapting Chondrus crispus for sizing, which superseded Woolnough's methods in Europe and the US.

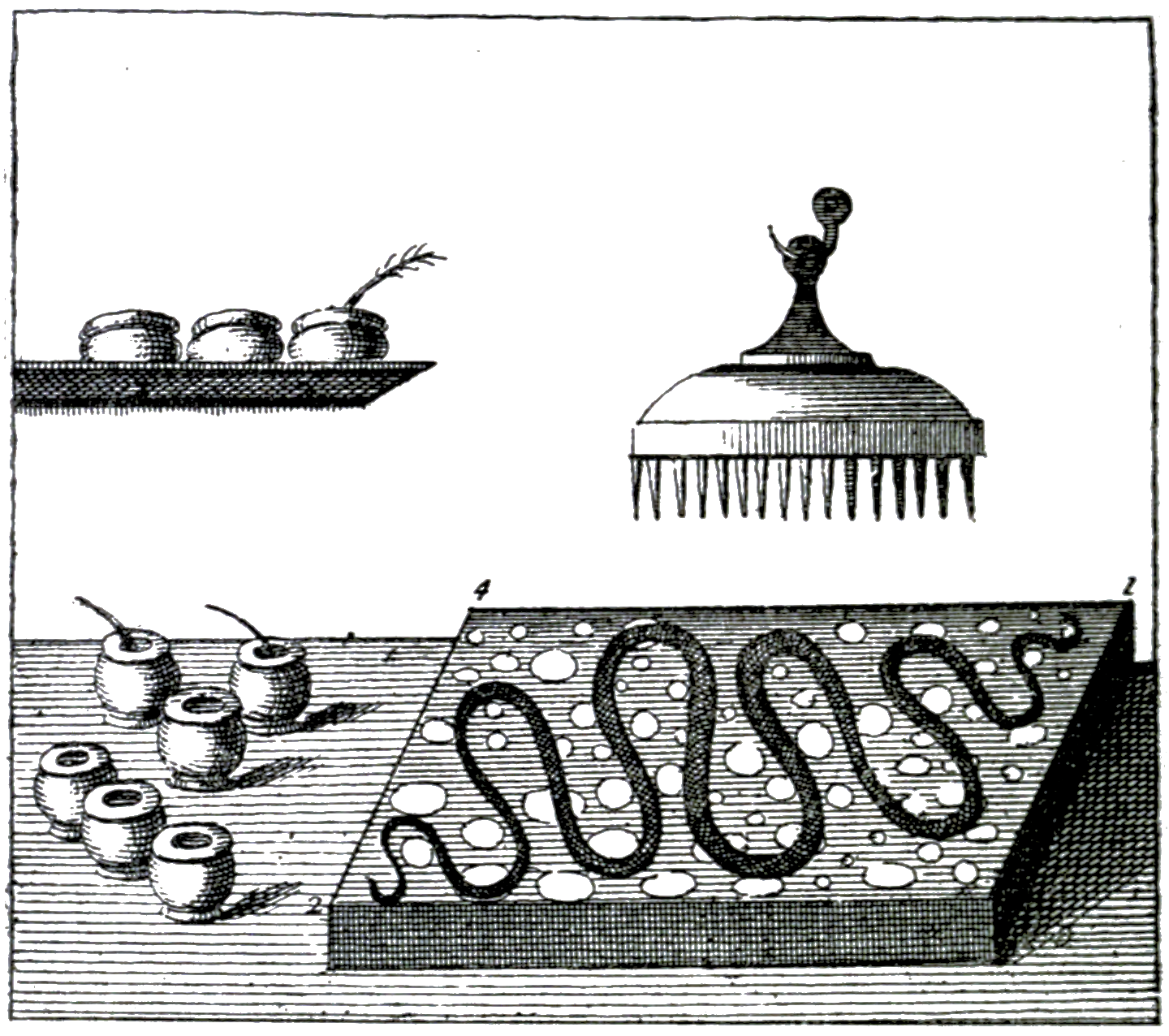
Marbling tray and tools from School of Arts (1750)

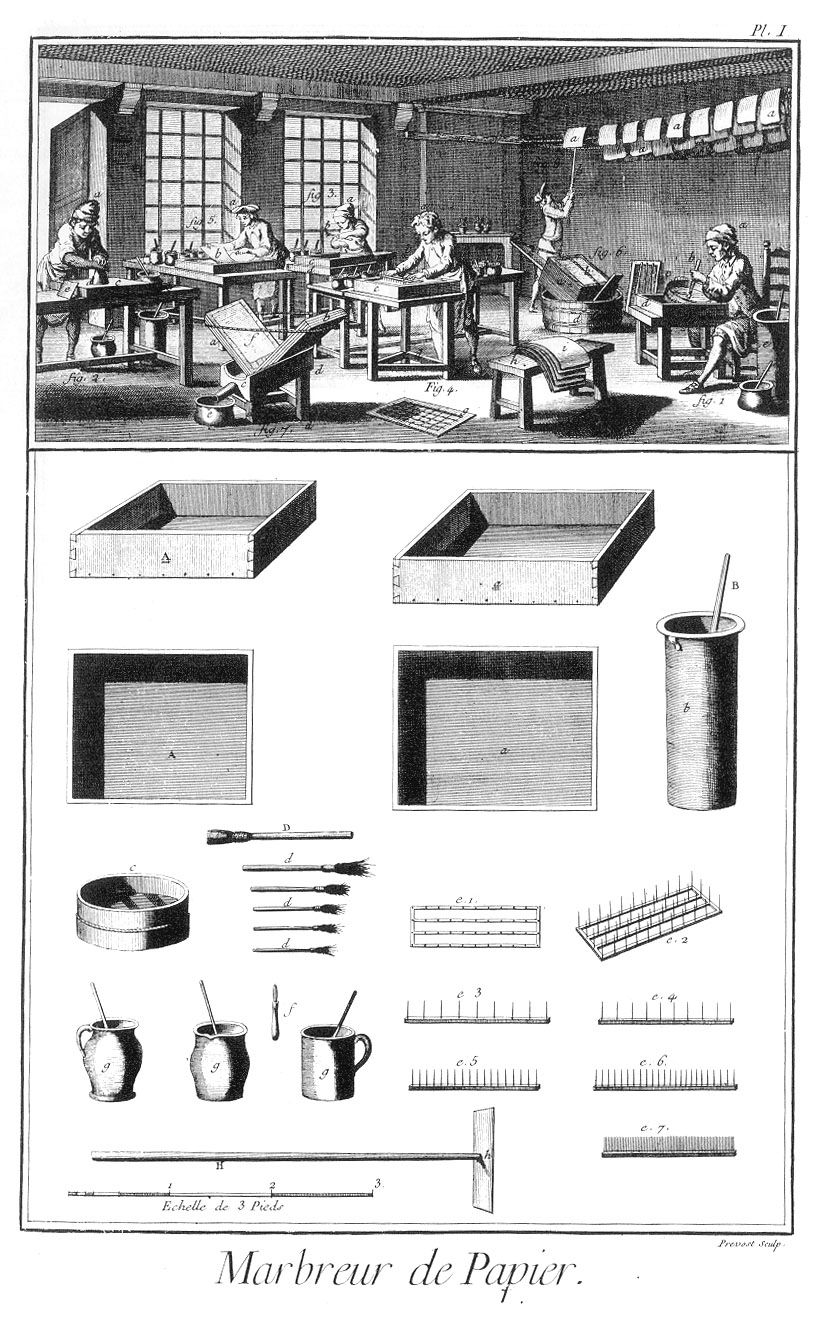
Marblers at work, from l'Encyclopedie of Diderot and d'Alembert

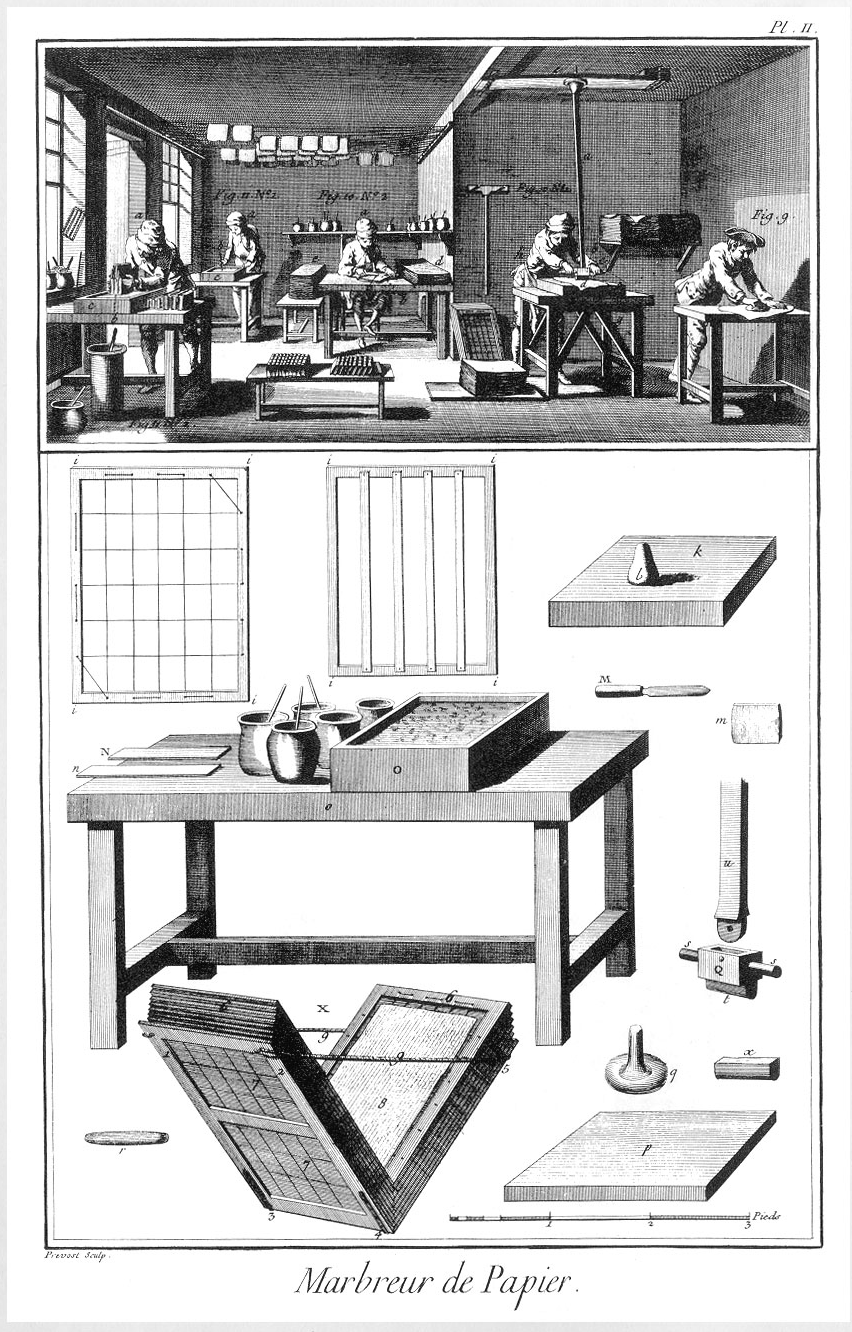
An edge marbler and paper finisher with related equipment, from l'Encyclopedie

== In the 21st century ==
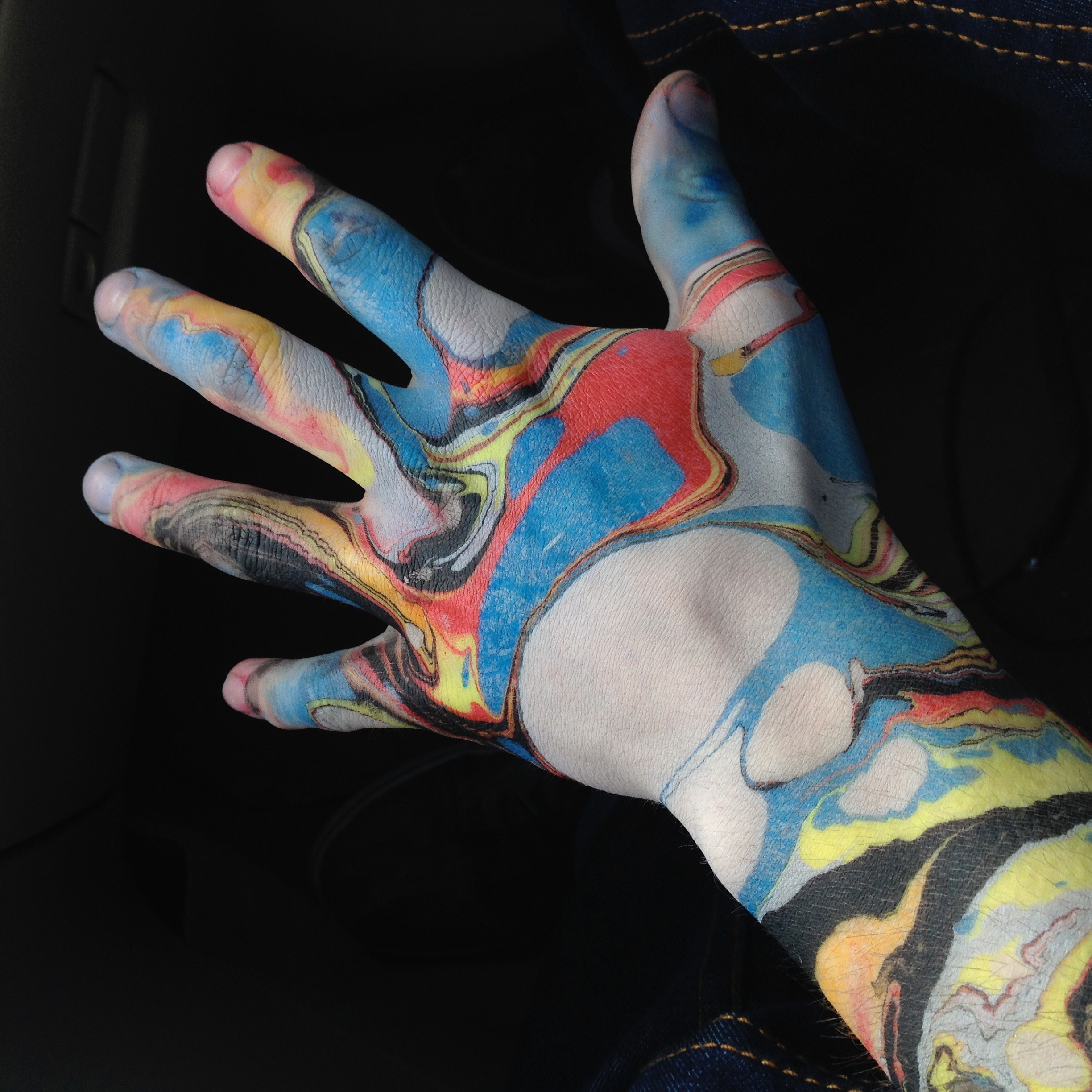
A body marbled hand

Marblers still make marbled paper and fabric, even applying the technique to three-dimensional surfaces. Aside from continued traditional applications, artists now explore using the method as a kind of painting technique, and as an element in collage. In recent decades, international symposia and museum exhibitions featured the art. A marbling journal Ink & Gall sponsored the first International Marblers' Gathering held in Santa Fe, New Mexico, in 1989.

Contemporary designers also employ marbled motifs in graphic design and print design as decorative backgrounds.

Another adaptation called body marbling has emerged at public events and festivals, applied with non-toxic, water-based neon or ultraviolet reactive paints.

== Examples ==
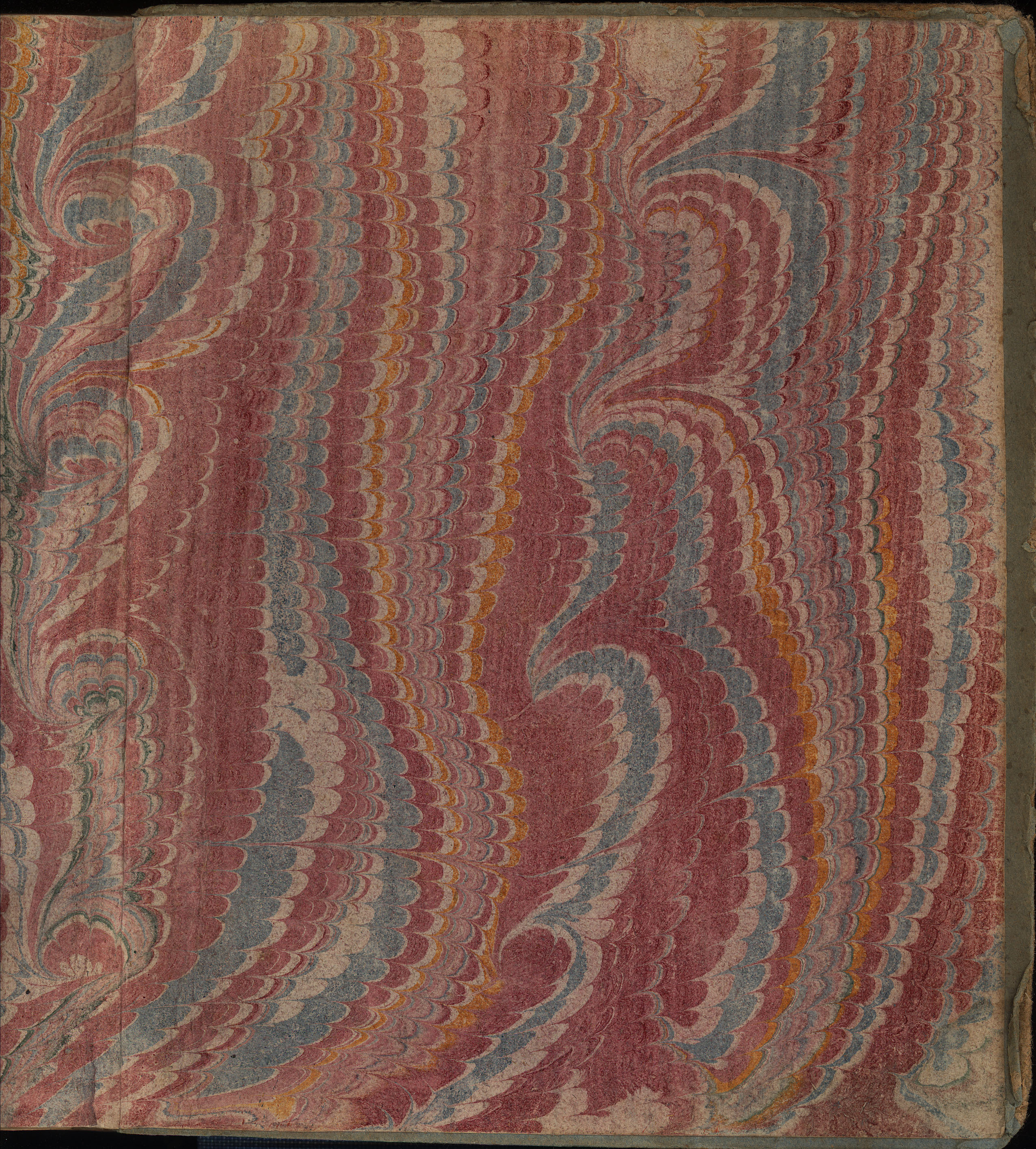
Marbled endpaper from a book bound in the Netherlands or Germany between 1720 and 1770

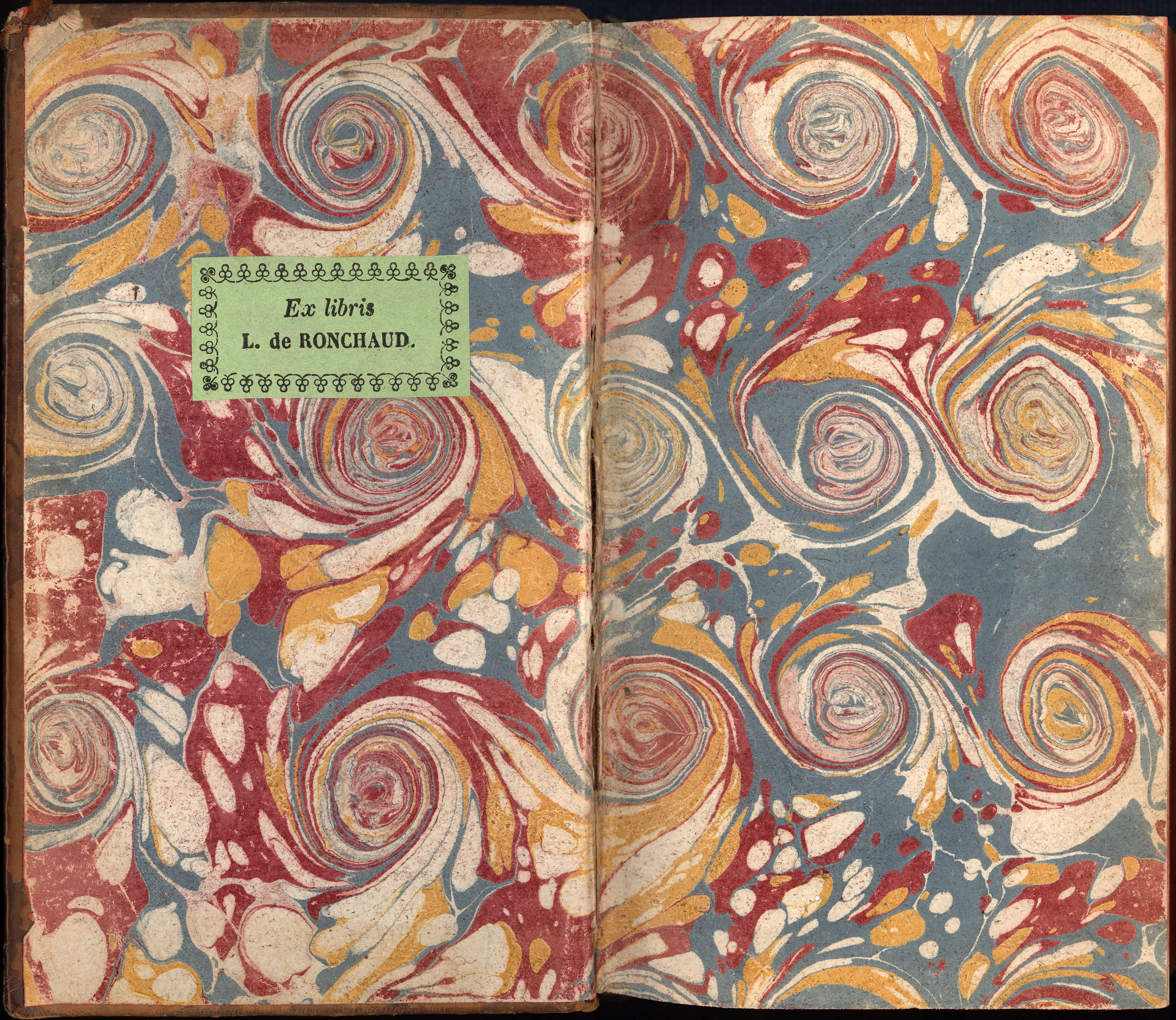
Marbled endpaper from a book bound in France around 1735

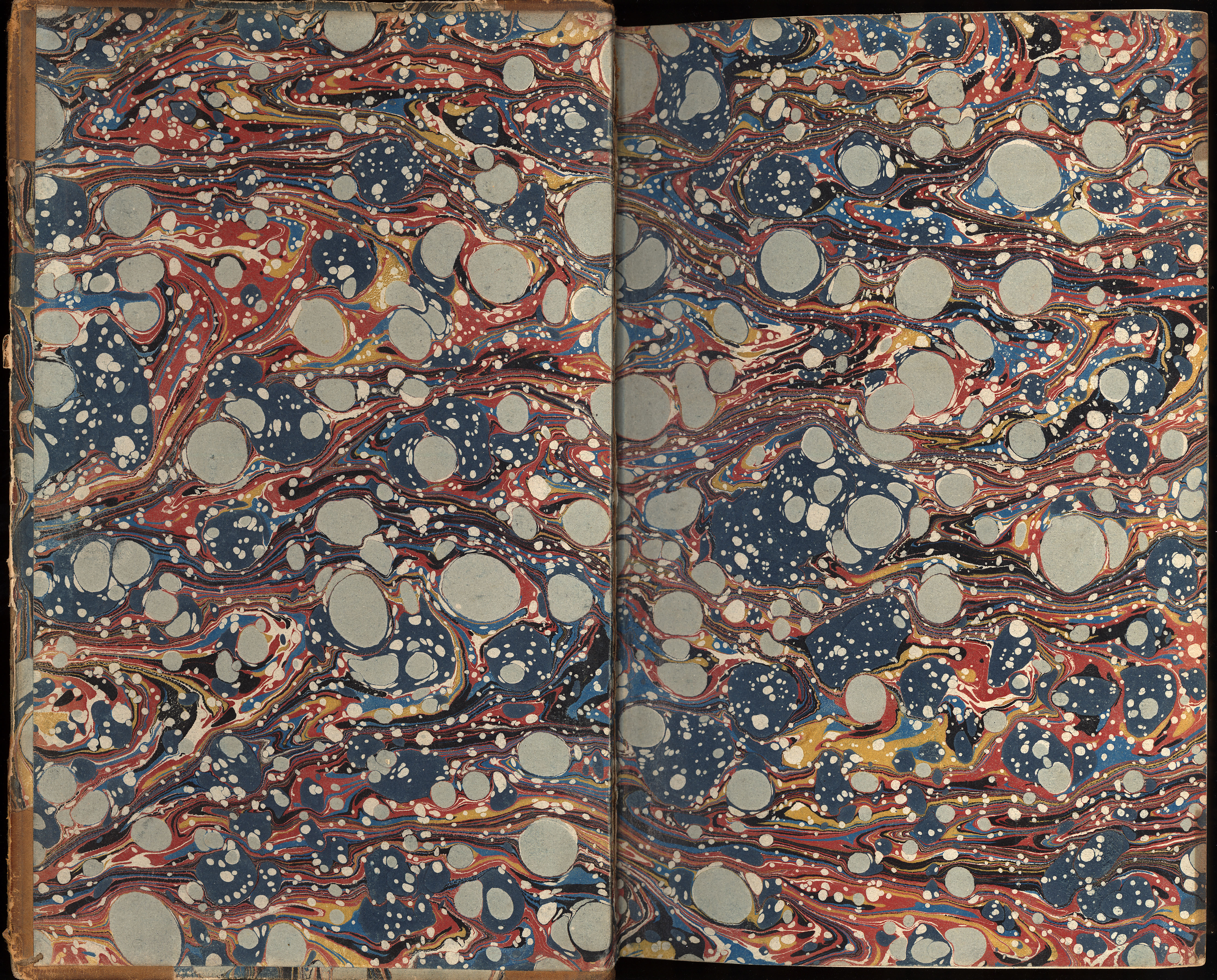
Paper marbling from a book bound in England around 1830

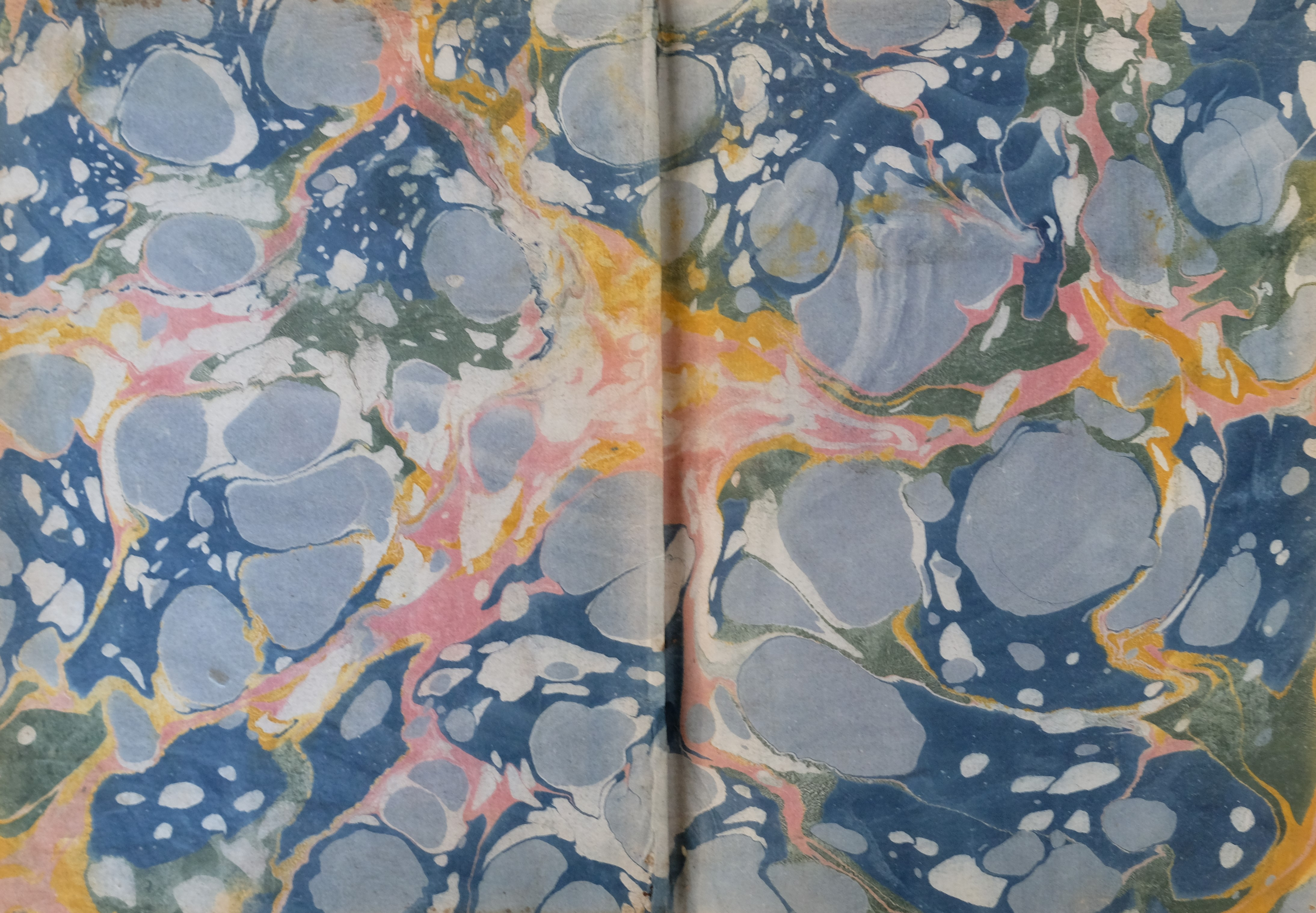
Paper marbling in a 1718 copy of Opere di Galileo Galilei

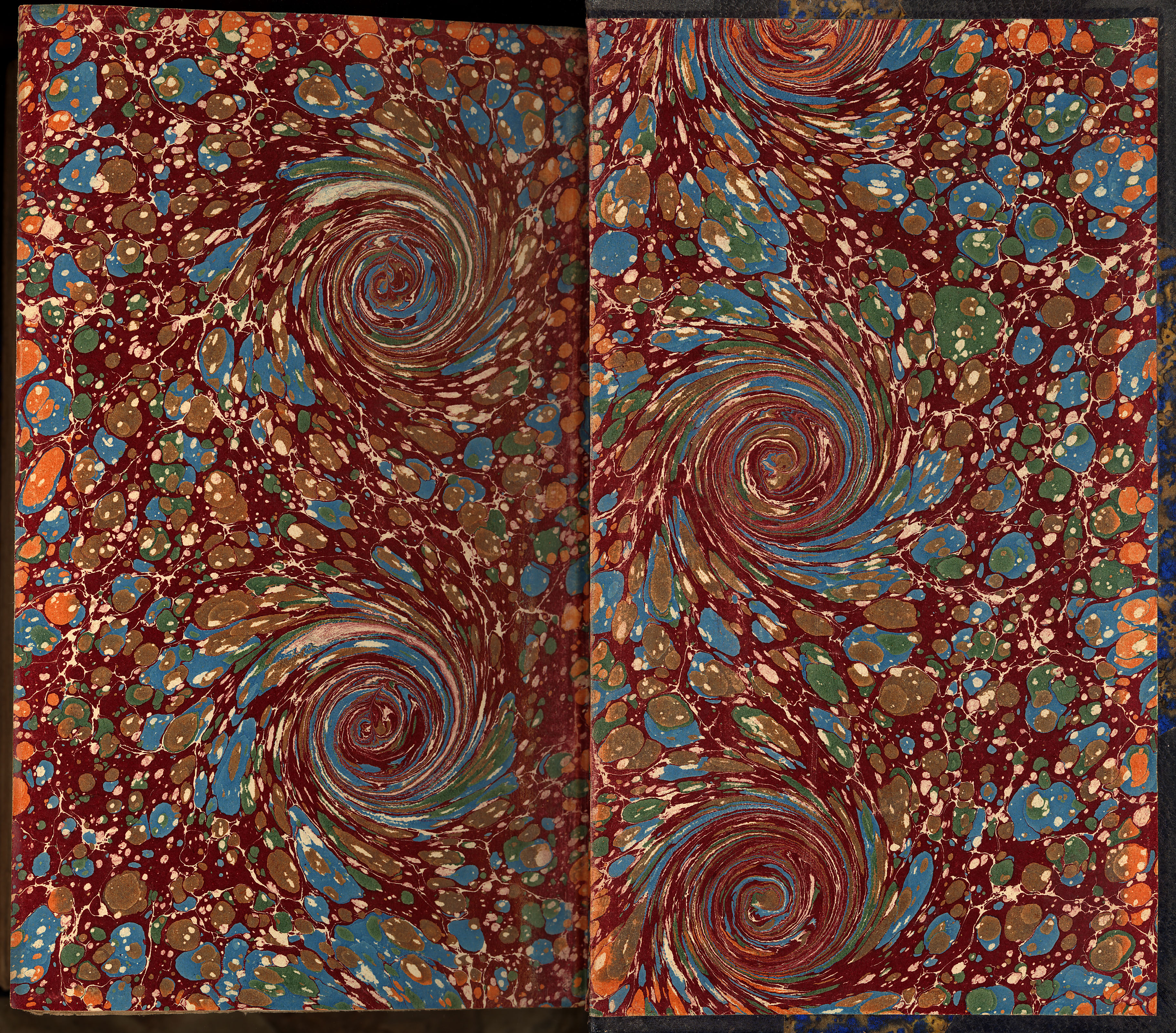
Marbled endpaper from a book bound in France around 1880

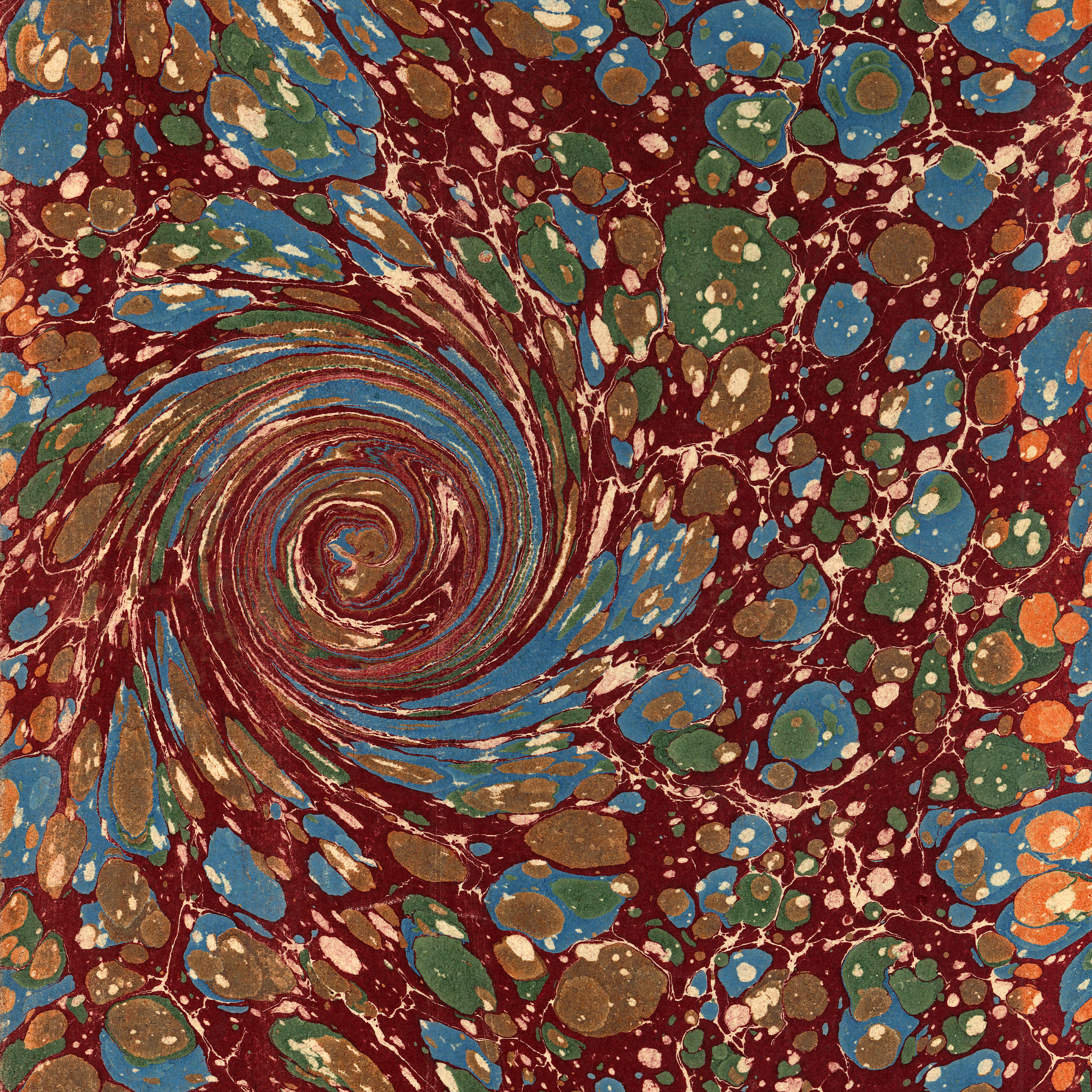
Marbled endpaper from a book bound in France around 1880 (detail)

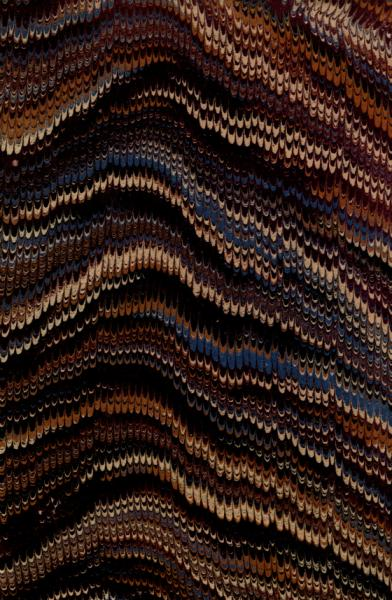
A combed marbled pattern from the front flyleaf of a binding of The Playmate: A Pleasant Companion for Spare Hours by Joseph Cundall, Printed by Barclay, 1847.

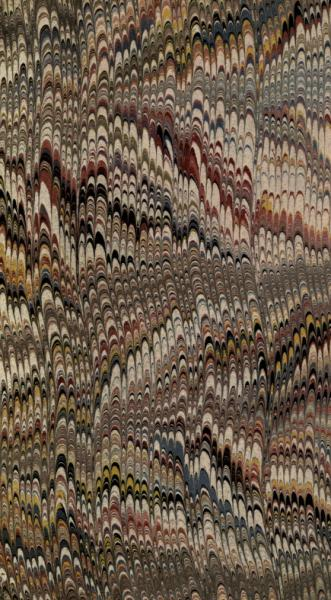
Combed marbled paper, from the front flyleaf of a binding of Oriental Fragments by Maria Hack, printed in London for Harvey and Dartman, 1828

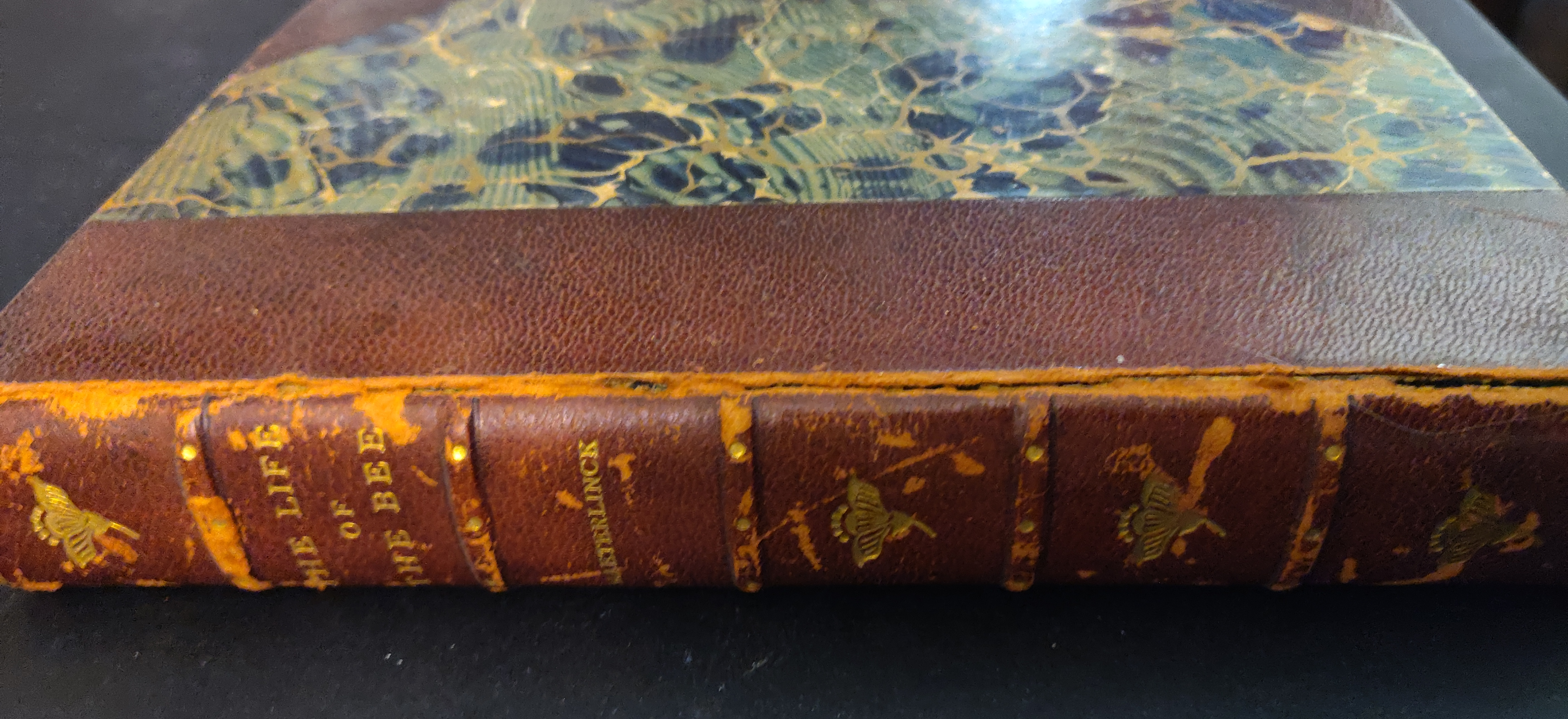
1912 edition of Dodd, Mead and Company's The Life of the Bee by Maurice Maeterlinck

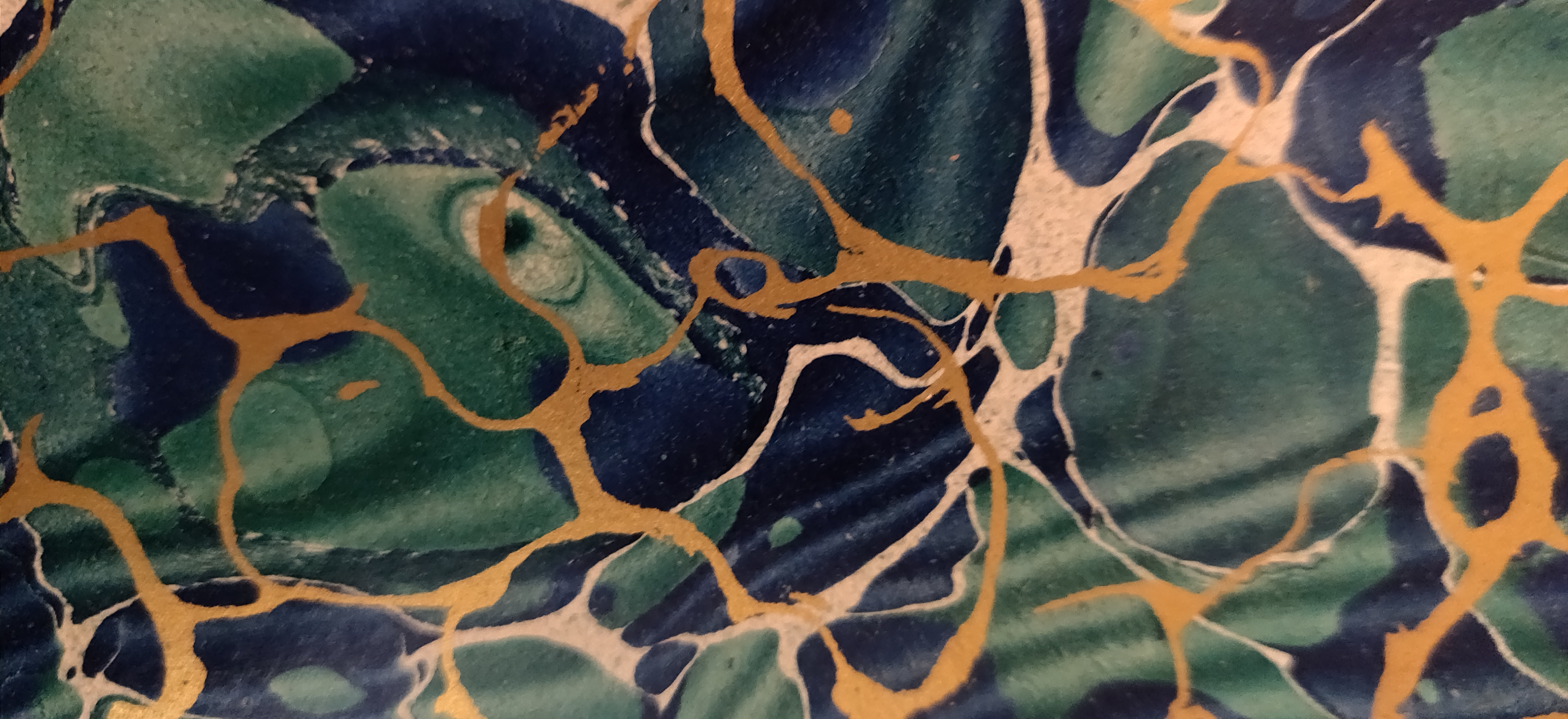
Frontispiece detail of The Life of the Bee

== See also ==
- Marbleizing
- Paste paper
- Water transfer printing
