= Brad Lawrence =

American entrepreneur

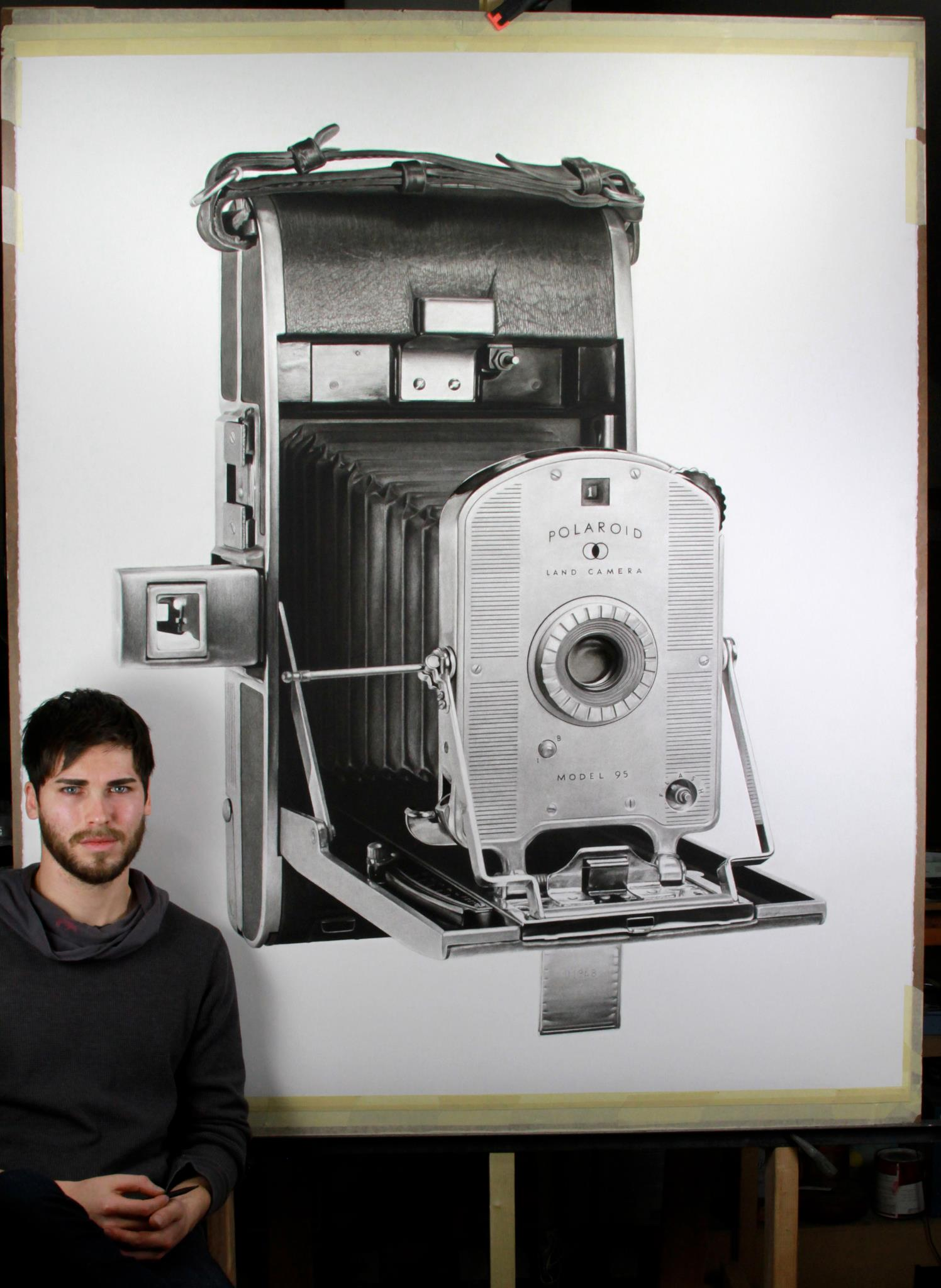
Lawrence posing in front of one of his finished hyperrealism charcoal pieces.

Brad Lawrence (born October 22, 1989, Michigan) is an American entrepreneur and artist. He is the founder of the psychedelic art company Black Light Visuals. In 2011, Lawrence graduated from College for Creative Studies in Detroit with a Bachelor of Fine Arts degree. In college, Lawrence specialized in hyperrealism charcoal drawings, but when he developed tendonitis he switched to hydro-dipping.

== College for Creative Studies ==
Born in Michigan on October 22, 1989, Lawrence developed an interest in art, and later received a scholarship from College for Creative Studies (CCS) in Detroit. During Lawrence's enrollment at CCS, he focused on his drawing experience, and also studied abroad in Ireland. The aftermath of his experience in Ireland is what eventually inspired him to experiment with black light art. While at school he wrote, "After spending four months doing charcoals, I craved the reintroduction of color to my work. My dad had been screen printing ultra-violet tapestries for decades, but I had not previously embraced the media in my own work."

== Black Light Visuals ==
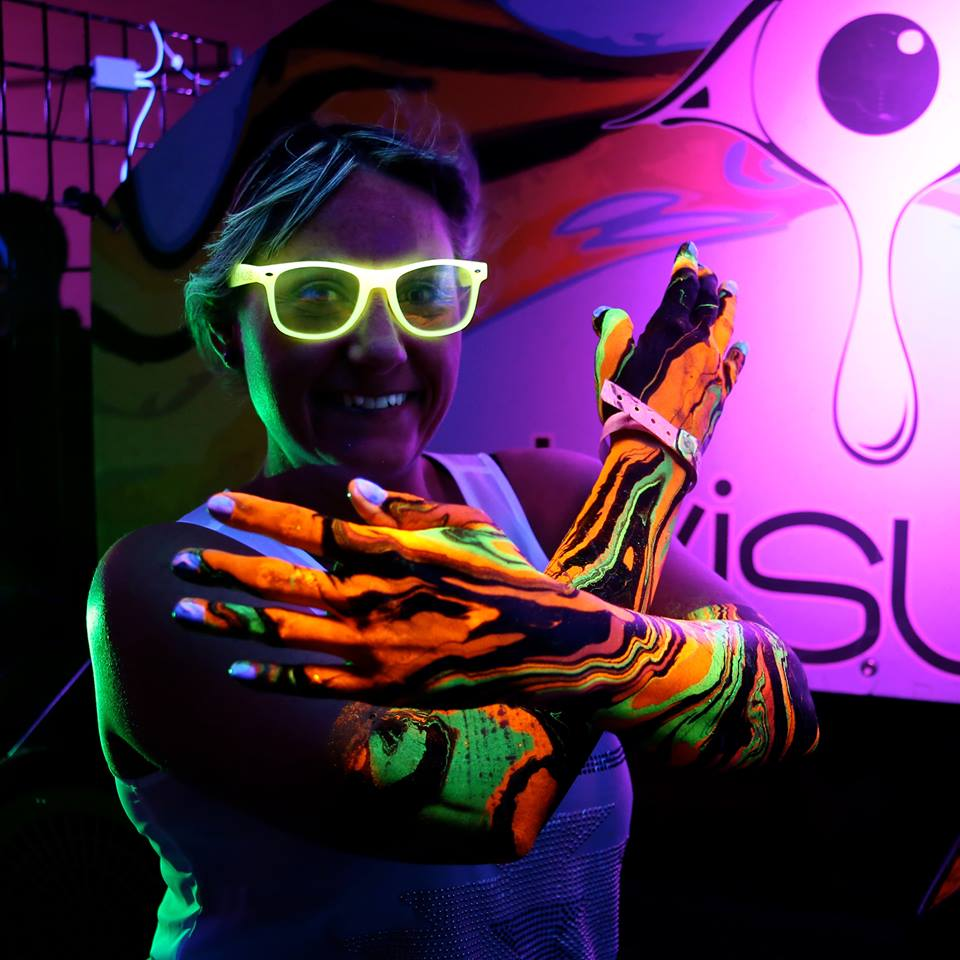
A woman poses for a photo at a BLVisuals body painting installation.

Black Light Visuals markets itself through EDM festivals. The company specializes in a process called body marbling: a painting technique that applies droplets of paint to a fluid surface. This allows the colors to expand and contract naturally on the fluid. The colors can also be manipulated into different designs by pulling a needle or other thin object vertically through the surface. Lawrence's process differs from many traditional marbling styles, and uses only materials and compounds that are safe on skin and clothing. The varying tensions between each color keep the different hues separated, and the result is a swirling, psychedelic painting that they transfer on to clothing or skin.
