= Ox gall =

Bile from the gallbladder of a cow

Ox gall (also spaced oxgall) is bile, also known as "gall", is a liver secretion obtained from cows, it is an ingredient in bile soap and mixed with alcohol and used as the wetting agent in paper marbling, engraving, lithography, and watercolor painting. It is a greenish-brown liquid mixture containing cholesterol, lecithin, taurocholic acid, and glycocholic acid.

In the 18th century it was discovered that ox gall had degreasing properties and was effective at removing protein based stains.
