= Body marbling =

Painting process used on human skin

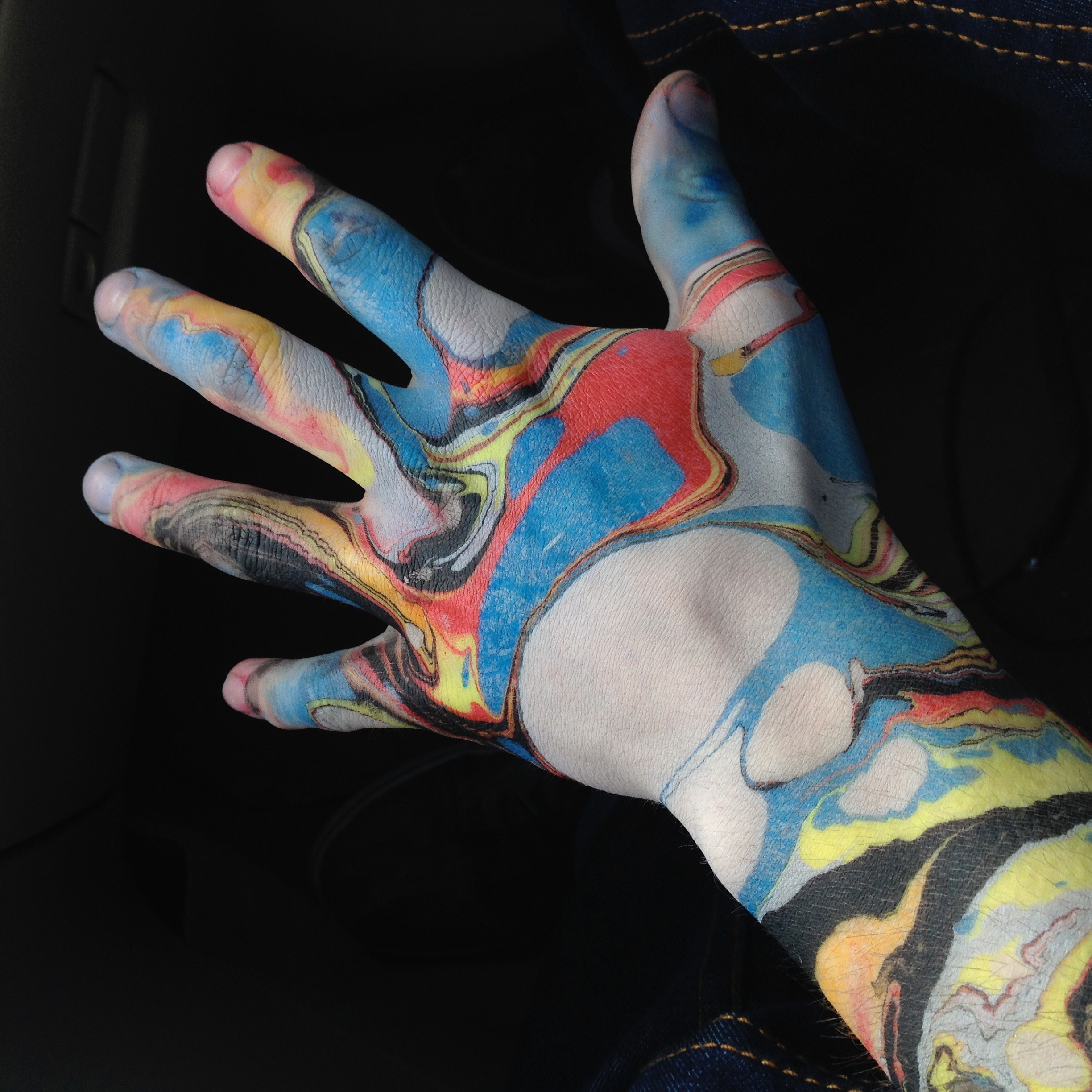
Body marbling on hand

Body marbling is a painting process similar to paper marbling, in which paint is floated on water and transferred to a person's skin. Unlike the traditional oil-based technique for paper, neon or ultraviolet reactive colours are typically used, and the paint is water-based and non-toxic. The term "body marbling" was coined in 2011 by Brad Lawrence of Black Light Visuals. (Note: The phrase "Body Marbling" is a trade mark registered by BLVISUALS on 15 August 2017.) Body marbling has become popular at festivals.

== Painting process ==
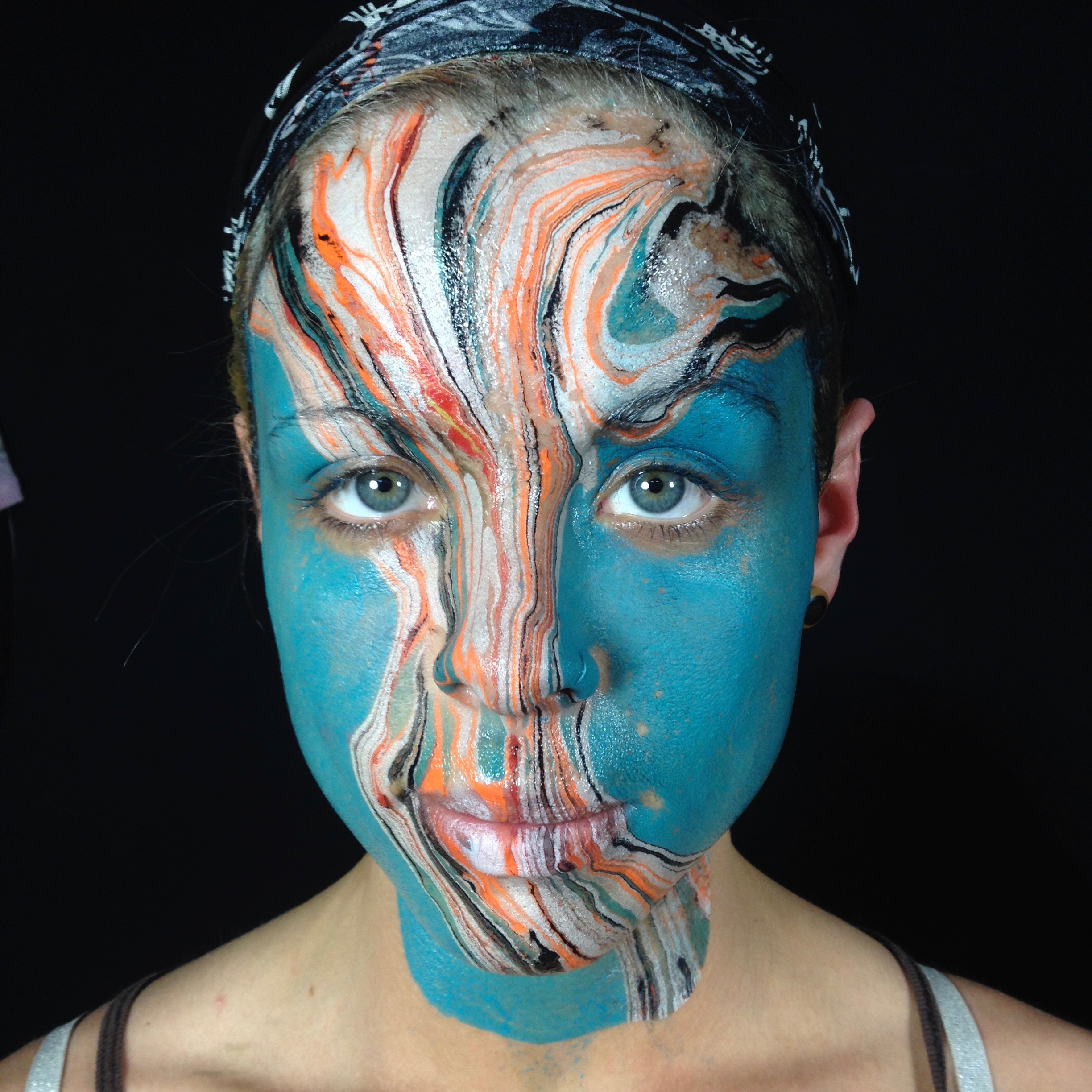
BLVisuals face painting. Taken October 2013

The skin is bathed in a salt water solution which allows the paint to adhere. The desired pattern is created by adding drops of paint to the water surface, and transferred to the skin by dipping. The water for painting is mixed with a thickening agent such as guar gum. The skin is then dipped in a rinse bath and allowed to dry. The painting is temporary and can be removed by washing.

== See also ==
- Body painting
