= Hatip Mehmed Efendi =

Ottoman paper marbling artist

- Died: 1773; Sirkeci, Istanbul, Ottoman Empire
- Other names: Khatib; Khatib of Hagia Sophia
- Occupations: Paper marbling artist (ebru); khatib of Hagia Sophia
- Known for: Improving the consistency of ebru size; strengthening colours and patterns

Hatip Mehmed Efendi (died 1773) was an Ottoman paper marbling artist noted for improving the consistency of the size enabling stronger colours and patterns.

He served as the khatib (the individual who delivers the khutbah) of Hagia Sophia, therefore was known as khatib or khatib of Hagia Sophia.

He died during a fire at his house in Sirkeci while attempting to save his works.
