= History of childhood =

The history of childhood has been a topic of interest in social history since the highly influential book Centuries of Childhood, published by French historian Philippe Ariès in 1960. He argued "childhood" as a concept was created by modern society. Ariès studied paintings, gravestones, furniture, and school records. He found before the 17th-century, children were represented as mini-adults.

Other scholars have emphasized how medieval and early modern child rearing was not indifferent, negligent, nor brutal. The historian Stephen Wilson argues that in the context of pre-industrial poverty and high infant mortality (with a third or more of the babies dying), actual child-rearing practices represented appropriate behavior in the circumstances. He points to extensive parental care during sickness, and to grief at death, sacrifices by parents to maximize child welfare, and a wide cult of childhood in religious practice.

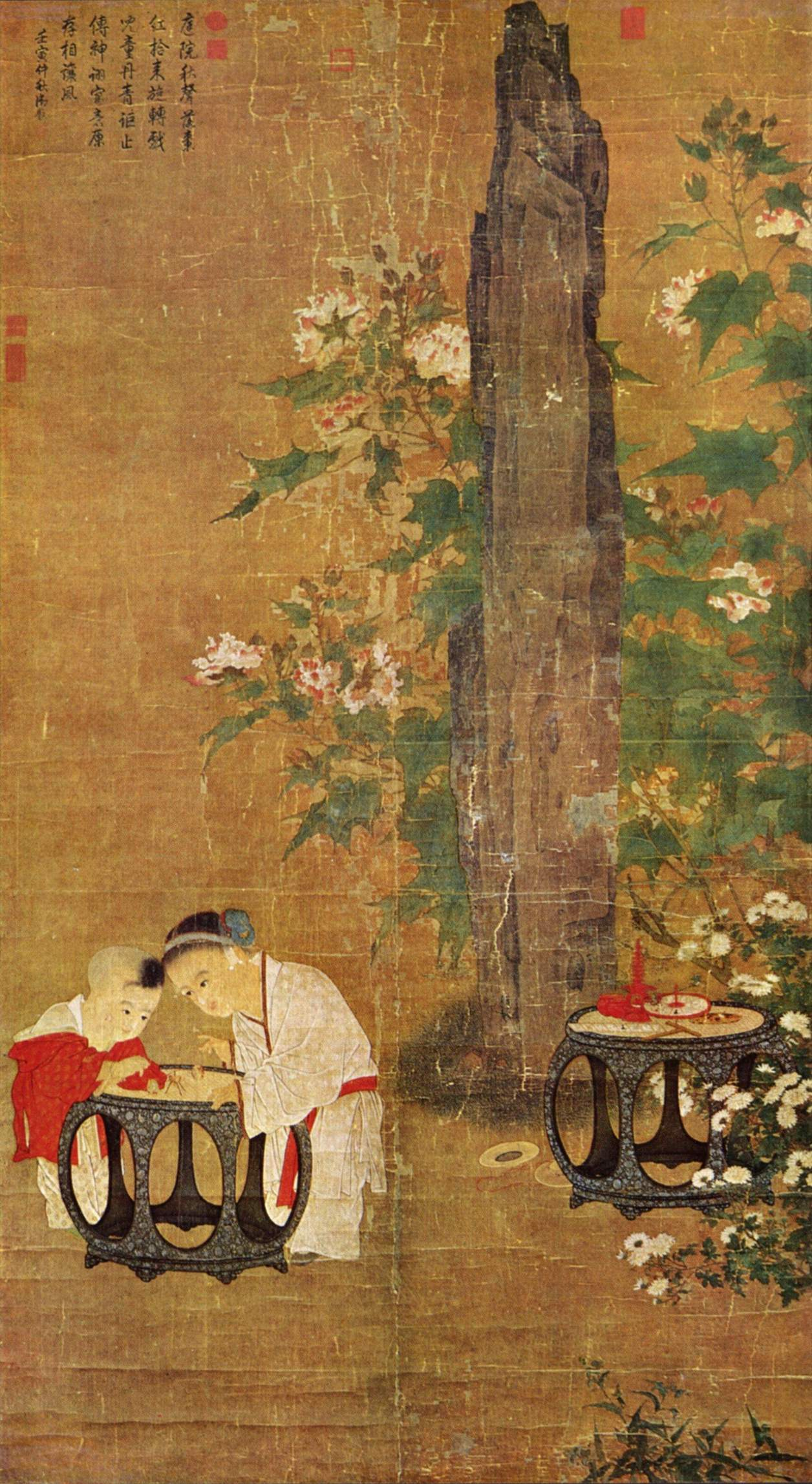
Playing Children, by Song dynasty Chinese artist Su Hanchen, c. 1150 AD

== Preindustrial and medieval ==
Historians had assumed traditional families in the preindustrial era involved the extended family, with grandparent, parents, children and perhaps some other relatives all living together and ruled by an elderly patriarch. There were examples of this in the Balkans—and in aristocratic families. However, the typical pattern in Western Europe was the much simpler nuclear family of husband, wife and their children (and perhaps a servant, who might well be a relative). Children were often temporarily sent off as servants to relatives in need of help.

In medieval Europe there was a model of distinct stages of life, which demarcated when childhood began and ended. A new baby was a notable event. Nobles immediately started thinking of a marriage arrangement that would benefit the family. Birthdays were not major events as the children celebrated their saints' day after whom they were named. Church law and common law regarded children as equal to adults for some purposes and distinct for other purposes.

Education in the sense of training was the exclusive function of families for the vast majority of children until the 19th century. In the Middle Ages the major cathedrals operated education programs for small numbers of teenage boys designed to produce priests. Universities started to appear to train physicians, lawyers, and government officials, and (mostly) priests. The first universities appeared around 1100: the University of Bologna in 1088, the University of Paris in 1150, and the University of Oxford in 1167. Students entered as young as 13 and stayed for 6 to 12 years.

== Early modern periods ==
In England during the Elizabethan era, the transmission of social norms was a family matter and children were taught the basic etiquette of proper manners and respecting others. Some boys attended grammar school, usually taught by the local priest. During the 1600s, a shift in philosophical and social attitudes toward children and the notion of "childhood" began in Europe. Adults increasingly saw children as separate beings, innocent and in need of protection and training by the adults around them.

English philosopher John Locke was particularly influential in defining this new attitude towards children, especially with regard to his theory of the tabula rasa, promulgated in his 1690 An Essay Concerning Human Understanding. In Locke's philosophy, tabula rasa was the theory that the (human) mind is at birth a "blank slate" without rules for processing data, and that data are added and rules for processing are formed solely by one's sensory experiences. A corollary of this doctrine was that the mind of the child was born blank, and that it was the duty of the parents to imbue the child with correct notions. Locke himself emphasised the importance of providing children with "easy pleasant books" to develop their minds rather than using force to compel them: "children may be cozened into a knowledge of the letters; be taught to read, without perceiving it to be anything but a sport, and play themselves into that which others are whipped for."

During the early period of capitalism, the rise of a large, commercial middle class, mainly in the Protestant countries of Holland and England, brought about a new family ideology centred around the upbringing of children. Puritanism stressed the importance of individual salvation and concern for the spiritual welfare of children. It became widely recognized that children possess rights on their own behalf. This included the rights of poor children to sustenance, membership in a community, education, and job training. The Poor Relief Act 1601 in Elizabethan England put responsibility on each parish to care for all the poor children in the area.

=== Childhood in Early Modern England ===
Throughout the course of the Early Modern Period, childhood was split into multiple sections: adolescence, working and familial jobs, education, and sexual relations and marriage. However, the ages defining these different steps in development were arbitrary. Regardless of the age descriptions of each developmental stage, each person went through these stages in their life. This research will focus on the stages of childhood within early modern England, specifically the mid-sixteenth century through the mid-seventeenth century.

Adolescence was a short-lived period in a child's life. Many historians debate this quick transition into adult life. Philippe Ariès performed a study on childhood and argued that in theory and practice, adolescence was almost unknown, stating that once a child had reached the age of six or seven, they would become part of the adult world. Other historians have argued that, “adolescence - the blossoming or lustful age...could begin at the age of 9 but also at 14; you could span the years between 14, or 18, and up to 25, 28, or simply until marriage.” It is difficult to properly assess the different stages of childhood because there was no defining moment that signaled the transition between stages. Thus making this arbitrary interpretation a conflict amongst historians. Regardless of this, there are still general categories that are somewhat all-encompassing despite age differences.

A wide belief shared amongst theorists describes human instincts as inherently sinful from adolescence, especially in infants, children and youth. This links to the theory of the Greek physician, Galen. Within his theory, Galenic physiology believed that humans passed through four separate ages, each controlled by a humour. "Small infants were dominated by the blood humour; mature persons were governed by the black choler; and old age by the phlegm. Youth was governed by the red choler, which was also associated with hotness and dryness, with the summer season, and with fire...The notion of youth as a period governed by hot temper, or humour, or fire...could be used to evoke a variety of qualities: boldness, arrogance, excessive activity, rashness, a spirit easily drawn to quarrelling and vengeance, and especially to disobedience, riot, and rebelliousness."

This aggression and rashness associated with childhood adolescence resulted in a connection with sin in religion. Because of this, parents were responsible for providing their children with “constant and diligent nurturing, strict discipline, and a proper education," as part of the Catholic role in parenthood. Without these, their children would be tempted to do wrong. To add to that, about half of children would die before they reached the age of ten, so parents required strict discipline and hovered from using too much affection, which only increased the children's respect for their parents. Within multiple autobiographies from the early modern period, authors even admitted to struggling between whether to follow God or Satan's invitations. However, most authors reprimanded themselves for having immoral thoughts, and even resulted in an inclination to spiritual practices later in life.

Despite how these negative theories correlated with adolescence, sometimes these behaviors were acceptable because the general consensus was that these behaviors would eventually disappear with time. Therefore, not all associations with adolescence were unfavorable. It was important, however, that parents guide their children through these rough stages of adolescence to ensure complete elimination of these tendencies. Children valued their parents’ opinion and blessing, thus emphasizing the importance of the parent-child relationship during the stages of adolescence.

From a very young age, children were required to help with work within the family; these children were also expected to continue helping the family until they were able or willing to leave the house. As they grew, children were given more physically demanding or harder jobs. To add to that, boys and girls had different tasks growing up that normally fit within tasks they would have to perform later in life.

Children did have jobs within the household that they performed year round. This includes, “fetching water and gathering sticks for fuel, going on errands, assisting mothers in milking, preparing food, cleaning, washing and mending. These tasks were dependent on the regions each family lived in; rural families taught children how to spin and card, and some girls were educated in stocking-knitting, hand-knitting, and lacemaking. These were useful skills for urban women to gain as they became popular industries in the 17th century.

In other seasons, children performed a myriad of tasks around the property. Younger children helped with harrowing, scaring birds away from corn, pulling weeds, gathering fruits, and spreading dung for food. During the winter, children still assisted their parents by “threshing, stacking sheaves, cleaning the barn and, in places and soils that required it in the winter, ploughing as well.”

By aiding in familial chores, children learned the importance and value in working. Not only was this essential to development, but it provided funds for families that were in poverty. From the sixteenth century to the first half of the seventeenth century, the population of England doubled, reaching 5 million. As the population grew, so did poverty. Children were more susceptible to poverty, which explains why working was so crucial; if children were not helping they could become an economic burden on their families.

Within these responsibilities, there were differences in jobs based on gender. One account recalls that their sister was taught to read, knit, do needle work, and spin. Not only that, but young girls also assisted in housework with washing, marketing and preparing food. From this, one can infer that these jobs were typically given to women as this correlated with tasks they would be performing later in life. Preparing children with the information they needed to succeed in life was one of the many responsibilities parents’ held.

Education was significantly different for men and women in England. Living in a patriarchal society, men had societal advantages which included a stable education for the majority of their early life. Women, on the other hand, were typically educated in more remedial tasks that would assist them in being homemakers or having basic jobs.

For men, their education primarily consisted of preparing them for future careers in diverse fields. Professions associated with “higher learning, the church, law, medicine, business and crafts, military service, the Navy and husbandry,” were deemed appropriate for men. The number of schools greatly increased in the seventeenth century, providing more access for elementary and higher education. These were typically boarding schools, but there were women scattered around the country that taught basic reading and literacy to families who could not send their sons far away. Because of the easy access to schooling, many men were educated and able to obtain higher-level jobs. Liberal educational programs in England intended to prepare “‘gentlemen for Parliament, the pulpit, and the bar; for the management of private estates and public works for the professions and scholarship.’” Because of the abundant opportunities, men rose to positions of power, whether it be in the household or politics.

Women, however, did not have the same access to these resources. There was an increase in the number of schoolgirls and girl’s boarding schools. While men assumed the diverse positions offered to them, women learned “cookery and laundry… sewing… needlework… and the inculcation of social graces through the teaching of music and dancing.” Schooling for women was primarily for domestic purposes. Also, schooling was not necessarily typical for women; usually, upper families educated their daughters. Overall, a significant number of women were not formally educated. Having a classic education seemed like luxury; knowing about “provisioning, attending illnesses of the household, protecting the estates in the absence of fathers, brothers, and husbands, and dealing with legal matters were vital to the smooth running of estates.” Despite not having easy access to a formal education, women were responsible for teaching their children. It was the parent's duty to guide their children through life by shaping their morals and values Therefore, women lacked the same opportunities as men. Despite this, they still proved useful running the household; whether that be taking care of children, sewing clothes, or doing household chores. Equality regarding education would not happen for a long time, but women made small strides in learning to read and be literate, despite their lack of educational opportunities.

Typically, childhood reached its end with marriage. Theories behind virginity and processes of courtship during the early modern period also enforced the patriarchal structure of society; marriage was also another reminder of how that patriarchal structure affects households. Following marriage, men and women typically evolved into parenthood, symbolizing the end of their adolescence.

Before courtship occurred, there were pressures arising from both men and women's families for marriage, but there was also promiscuity between both parties. Men visiting bawdy-houses was not out of the ordinary; “young people appear then to have been… less rigid in their morals than married adults. This was true of males and to some extent of females.” Courtship occurred as well. This included “casual companionship” at public events, but also meetings in much more private areas; this included “regular meetings, close familiarity, and a great deal of physical contact in private or semi-private places.” On rare occasion, couples would spend an entire night together where “the young woman lived, in an alehouse, or in the open air.”

Following courtship, marriage ensued. Marriage was extremely important in early modern society. Some historians even believe that this was one of the most important processes in obtaining adulthood. It “involved the formation of a separate household which performed a multiplicity of social and economic roles - it was a locus of male authority and rule, and a unit of procreation, consumption and production.” The patriarchal household was crucial in a successful marriage. The husband primarily held the most power in the household, while the wife was in charge of being a mother and educating her children, and maintaining the household.

Even though the patriarchal structure of marriage was important, there were limitations. There were many social expectations, especially for women, regarding marriage. The expectations of sexual habits surrounding married women resulted in certain attitudes to form around female youth. In fact, there were even pressures surrounding marriage before the woman was even married; “family pressures on women’s choice of partners and their courting were stronger than those placed on men.” Despite how necessary it was for women to marry in order to fully succeed in life, women were extremely restricted in what they could do. They were usually contained to working in the household unless their husband passed, or they needed extra money in which she would most likely have a job in the textile field. All in all, marriage was important in symbolizing adulthood, but it still did restrict women and the roles they had in society.

Childhood had multiple stages in early modern England. Each of these developmental stages had specific characteristics that were followed with jobs or responsibilities for family members. Women and men had similar characteristics in adolescence, but as they got older, both split ways to take on their gender-specific roles, which implemented the idea of a patriarchal society.

== Enlightenment era ==
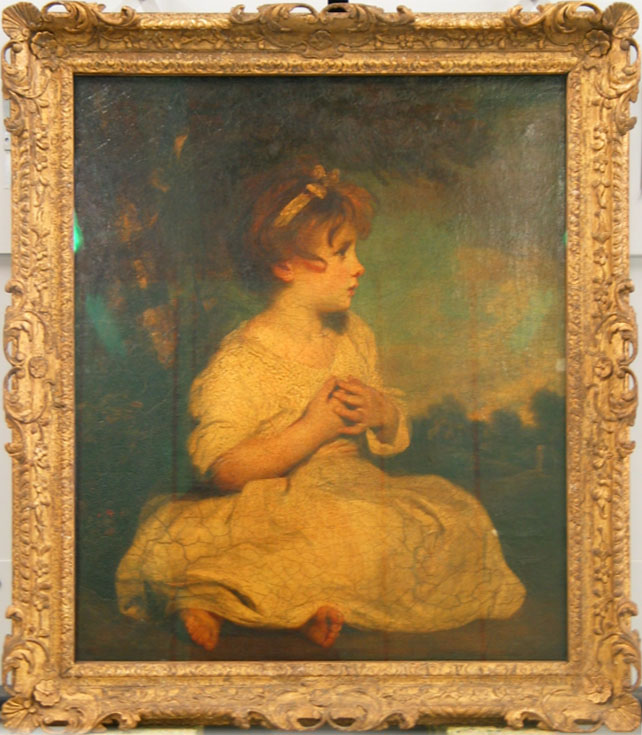
The Age of Innocence c.1785/8. Reynolds emphasized the natural grace of children in his paintings.

The modern notion of childhood with its own autonomy and goals began to emerge during the Enlightenment and the Romantic period that followed it. Jean Jacques Rousseau formulated the romantic attitude towards children in his famous 1762 novel Emile: or, On Education. Building on the ideas of John Locke and other 17th-century thinkers, Rousseau described childhood as a brief period of sanctuary before people encounter the perils and hardships of adulthood. "Why rob these innocents of the joys which pass so quickly," Rousseau pleaded. "Why fill with bitterness the fleeting early days of childhood, days which will no more return for them than for you?"

The idea of childhood as a locus of divinity and innocence is further expounded upon in William Wordsworth's "Ode: Intimations of Immortality from Recollections of Early Childhood", the imagery of which he "fashioned from a complex mix of pastoral aesthetics, pantheistic views of divinity, and an idea of spiritual purity based on an Edenic notion of pastoral innocence infused with Neoplatonic notions of reincarnation". This Romantic conception of childhood, historian Margaret Reeves suggests, has a longer history than generally recognized, with its roots traceable to similarly imaginative constructions of childhood circulating, for example, in the neo-platonic poetry of seventeenth-century metaphysical poet Henry Vaughan (e.g., "The Retreate", 1650; "Childe-hood", 1655). Such views contrasted with the stridently didactic, Calvinist views of infant depravity.

These new attitudes can be discerned from the dramatic increase in artistic depictions of children at the time. Instead of depicting children as small versions of adults typically engaged in 'adult' tasks, they were increasingly shown as physically and emotionally distinct and were often used as an allegory for innocence. Children are viewed and acknowledged as being powerless and inferior to the adult world surrounding them due to the myth of childhood innocence being accepted and acknowledged by society.

Sir Joshua Reynolds' extensive children portraiture clearly demonstrate the new enlightened attitudes toward young children. His 1788 painting The Age of Innocence, emphasizes the innocence and natural grace of the posing child and soon became a public favourite.

Building on Locke's theory that all minds began as a blank slate, the eighteenth century witnessed a marked rise in children's textbooks that were more easy to read, and in publications like poems, stories, novellas and games that were aimed at the impressionable minds of young learners. These books promoted reading, writing and drawing as central forms of self-formation for children.

During this period children's education became more common and institutionalized, in order to supply the church and state with the functionaries to serve as their future administrators. Small local schools where poor children learned to read and write were established by philanthropists, while the sons and daughters of the noble and bourgeois elites were given distinct educations at the grammar school and university.

== Children's rights under the law ==
With the onset of industrialisation in England, a growing divergence between high-minded romantic ideals of childhood and the reality of the growing magnitude of child exploitation in the workplace, became increasingly apparent. Although child labour was common in pre-industrial times, children would generally help their parents with the farming or cottage crafts. By the late 18th century, however, children were specially employed at the factories and mines and as chimney sweeps, often working long hours in dangerous jobs for low pay. In England and Scotland in 1788, two-thirds of the workers in 143 water-powered cotton mills were described as children. In 19th-century Great Britain, one-third of poor families were without a breadwinner, as a result of death or abandonment, obliging many children to work from a young age.

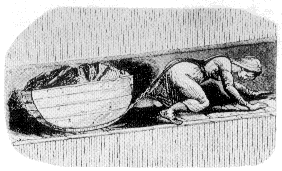
In coal mines, children would crawl through tunnels too narrow and low for adults.

As the century wore on, the contradiction between the conditions on the ground for children of the poor and the middle-class notion of childhood as a time of innocence led to the first campaigns for the imposition of legal protection for children. Reformers attacked child labor from the 1830s onward, bolstered by the horrific descriptions of London street life by Charles Dickens. The campaign that led to the Factory Acts was spearheaded by rich philanthropists of the era, especially Lord Shaftesbury, who introduced Bills in Parliament to mitigate the exploitation of children at the workplace. In 1833 he introduced the Ten Hours Act 1833 into the Commons, which provided that children working in the cotton and woollen industries must be aged nine or above; no person under the age of eighteen was to work more than ten hours a day or eight hours on a Saturday; and no one under twenty-five was to work nights. Legal interventions throughout the century increased the level of childhood protection, despite the prevalence of the Victorian laissez-faire attitude toward government interference. In 1856, the law permitted child labour past age 9 for 60 hours per week. In 1901, the permissible child labour age was raised to 12.

== Modern childhood ==
The modern attitude to children emerged by the late 19th century; the Victorian middle and upper classes emphasized the role of the family and the sanctity of the child – an attitude that has remained dominant in Western societies ever since. This can be seen in the emergence of the new genre of children's literature. Instead of the didactic nature of children's books of a previous age, authors began to write humorous, child-oriented books, more attuned to the child's imagination. Tom Brown's School Days by Thomas Hughes appeared in 1857, and is considered as the founding book in the school story tradition. Lewis Carroll's fantasy Alice's Adventures in Wonderland, published in 1865 in England, signalled the change in writing style for children to an imaginative and empathetic one. Regarded as the first "English masterpiece written for children" and as a founding book in the development of fantasy literature, its publication opened the "First Golden Age" of children's literature in Britain and Europe that continued until the early 1900s.

=== Compulsory schooling ===
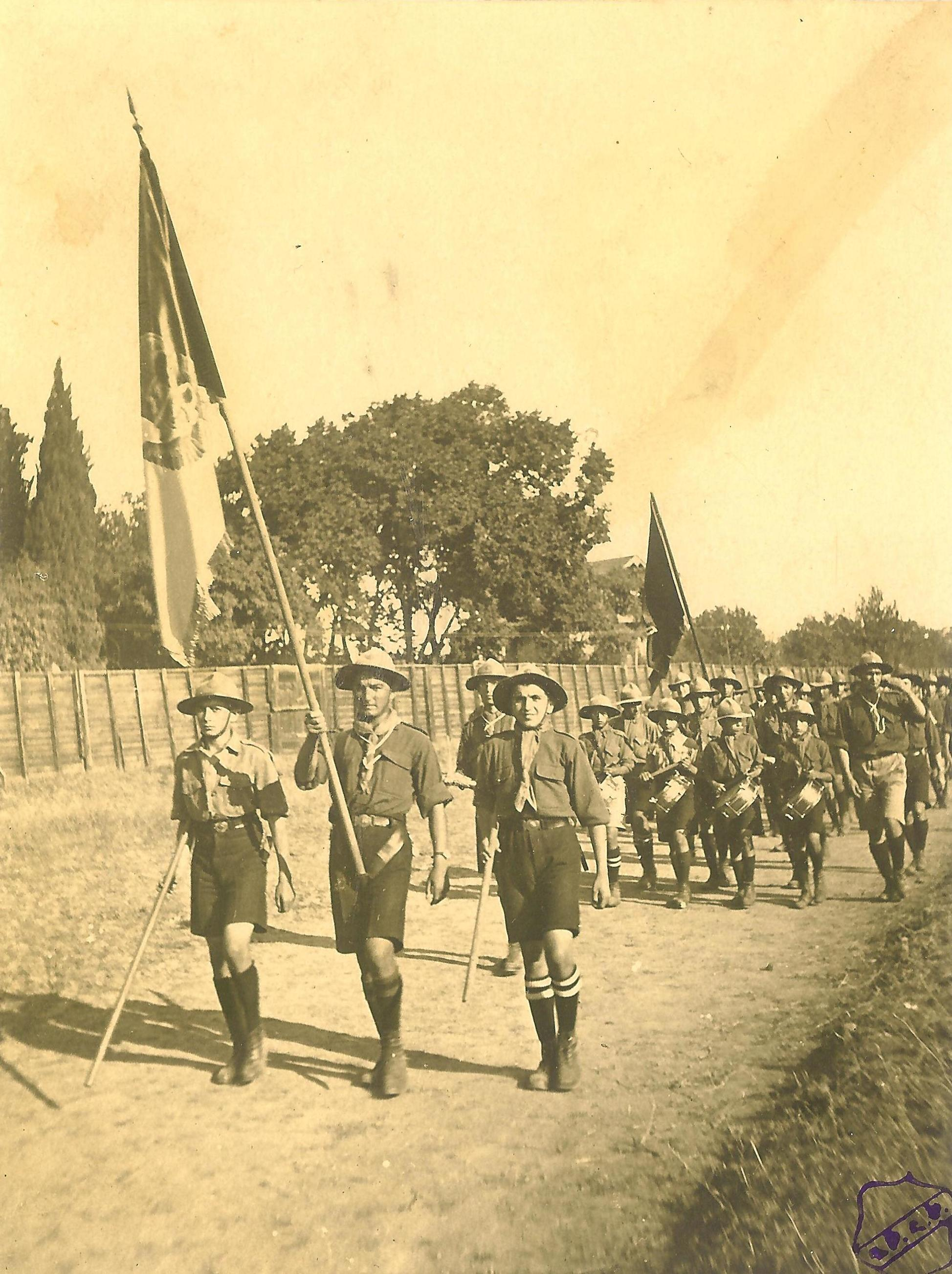
First procession of Armenian scouts in Constantinople in 1918

The latter half of the century also saw the introduction of compulsory state schooling of children across Europe, which decisively removed children from the workplace into schools. Modern methods of public schooling, with tax-supported schools, compulsory attendance, and educated teachers emerged first in Prussia in the early 19th century, and was adopted by Britain, the United States, France and other modern nations by 1900.

The market economy of the 19th century enabled the concept of childhood as a time of fun of happiness. Factory-made dolls and doll houses delighted the girls and organized sports and activities were played by the boys. The Boy Scouts was founded by Sir Robert Baden-Powell in 1908, which provided young boys with outdoor activities aiming at developing character, citizenship, and personal fitness qualities.

The nature of childhood on the American frontier is disputed. One group of scholars, following the lead of novelists Willa Cather and Laura Ingalls Wilder, argue that the rural environment was salubrious. Historians Katherine Harris and Elliott West write that rural upbringing promoted family interdependence, and in the end produced children who were more self-reliant, mobile, adaptable, responsible, independent and more in touch with nature than their urban or eastern counterparts. On the other hand, historians Elizabeth Hampsten and Lillian Schlissel offer a grim portrait of loneliness, privation, abuse, and demanding physical labor from an early age. Riney-Kehrberg takes a middle position.

=== Non-Western world ===
The modern concept of childhood was copied by non-Western societies as they modernized. In the vanguard was Japan, which actively began to engage with the West after 1860. Meiji era leaders decided that the nation-state had the primary role in mobilizing individuals – and children – in service of the state. The Western-style school was introduced as the agent to reach that goal. By the 1890s, schools were generating new sensibilities regarding childhood. By the turn of the 20th century, Japan had numerous reformers, child experts, magazine editors, and well-educated mothers who had adopted these new attitudes.

== See also ==
- Childhood
- Childhood studies
- Childhood in ancient Rome
- Childhood in literature
- Childhood in medieval England
- Childhood in the Viking Age
- Children's rights movement
- Early childhood education
- Elementary schools in Japan
- Foster care in the United States
- History of childhood care and education
- History of childhood in the United States
- History of education
  - History of education in the United States
- Orphans
- Timeline of children's rights in the United States
- Timeline of young people's rights in the United States
- United States Children's Bureau

== Bibliography ==
- Cunningham, Hugh. "Histories of childhood." American Historical Review 103.4 (1998): 1195–1208.
- Cunningham, Hugh. Children and Childhood in Western Society since 1500. (1995); strongest on Britain
- deMause, Lloyde, ed. The History of Childhood. (1976), psychohistory.
- Hawes, Joseph and N. Ray Hiner, eds. Children in Historical and Comparative Perspective (1991), articles by scholars
- Heywood, Colin. A History of Childhood (2001), from medieval to 20th century; strongest on France
- Kimmel, M. S., & Holler, J. (2011). 'The Gendered Family': Gender at the Heart of the Home. In The Gendered Society (3rd ed., pp. 141–88). Don Mills, ON: Oxford University Press.
- Pollock, Linda A. Forgotten Children: Parent-child relations from 1500 to 1900 (1983).
- Sommerville, John. The Rise and Fall of Childhood (1982), from antiquity to the present

=== Literature & ideas ===
- Bunge, Marcia J., ed. The Child in Christian Thought. (2001)
- O’Malley, Andrew. The Making of the Modern Child: Children’s Literature and Childhood in the Late Eighteenth Century. (2003).
- Zornado, Joseph L. Inventing the Child: Culture, Ideology, and the Story of Childhood. (2001), covers Shakespeare, Brothers Grimm, Freud, Walt Disney, etc.

=== Britain ===
- Cunnington, Phillis and Anne Buck. Children’s Costume in England: 1300 to 1900 (1965)
- Battiscombe, Georgina. Shaftesbury: A Biography of the Seventh Earl. 1801–1885 (1974)
- Hanawalt, Barbara. Growing Up in Medieval London: The Experience of Childhood in History (1995)
- Lavalette; Michael. A Thing of the Past? Child Labour in Britain in the Nineteenth and Twentieth Centuries (1999)
- Olsen, Stephanie. Juvenile Nation: Youth, Emotions and the Making of the Modern British Citizen. (2014)
- Pinchbeck, Ivy and Margaret Hewitt. Children in English Society. (2 vols. 1969); covers 1500 to 1948
- Sommerville, C. John. The Discovery of Childhood in Puritan England. (1992).
- Stone, Lawrence. The Family, Sex and Marriage in England 1500–1800 (1979).
- Tracy, Michael. The World of the Edwardian Child: As Seen in Arthur Mee's Children's Encyclopaedia, 1908-1910 (2008) "+&pg=PR1 online
- Welshman, John. Churchill's Children: The Evacuee Experience in Wartime Britain (2010)

=== Europe ===
- Ariès, Philippe. Centuries of Childhood: A Social History of Family Life. (1962). Influential study on France that helped launch the field
- Bruce, Emily C. Revolutions at Home: The Origin of Modern Childhood and the German Middle Class. (2021). University of Massachusetts Press
- Immel, Andrea and Michael Witmore, eds. Childhood and Children’s Books in Early Modern Europe, 1550–1800. (2006).
- Kopf, Hedda Rosner. Understanding Anne Frank's the Diary of a Young Girl: A Student Casebook to Issues, Sources, and Historical Documents (1997)
- Krupp, Anthony. Reason's Children: Childhood in Early Modern Philosophy (2009)
- Nicholas, Lynn H. Cruel World: The Children of Europe in the Nazi Web (2005) 656 pages
- Orme, Nicholas. Medieval Children (2003)
- Rawson, Beryl. Children and Childhood in Roman Italy (2003).
- Schultz, James. The Knowledge of Childhood in the German Middle Ages.
- Zahra, Tara. "Lost Children: Displacement, Family, and Nation in Postwar Europe," Journal of Modern History, March 2009, Vol. 81 no. 1, pages 45–86, covers 1945 to 1951 JSTOR 10.1086/593155.

=== United States ===
- Bernstein, Robin. Racial Innocence: Performing American Childhood from Slavery to Civil Rights (2011) online edition
- Block, James E. The Crucible of Consent: American Child Rearing and the Forging of Liberal Society (2012) excerpt and text search
- Chudacoff, Howard. Children at Play: An American History (2008).
- Clement, Priscilla Ferguson, and Jacqueline S. Reinier, eds. Boyhood in America: An Encyclopedia (2 vol. ABC CLIO, 2001).
- Del Mar, David Peterson. The American Family: From Obligation to Freedom (Palgrave Macmillan; 2012) 211 pages; the American family over four centuries.
- Fass, Paula. The End of American Childhood: A History of Parenting from Life on the Frontier to the Managed Child (2016) excerpt
- Fass, Paula, and Mary Ann Mason, eds. Childhood in America (2000), 725pp; short excerpts from 178 primary and secondary sources
- Fass, Paula and Michael Grossberg, eds. Reinventing Childhood After World War II (University of Pennsylvania Press; 2012) 182 pages; scholarly essays on major changes in the experiences of children in Western societies, with a focus on the U.S.
- Fieldston, Sara. Raising the World: Child Welfare in the American Century (Harvard University Press, 2015) 316 pp.
- Graff, Harvey J. Conflicting Paths: Growing Up in America (1997), a theoretical approach that uses a great deal of material from children
- Hiner, N. Ray Hiner, and Joseph M. Hawes, eds. Growing Up in America: Children in Historical Perspective (1985), essays by leading historians
- Holt, Marilyn Irvin. Cold War Kids: Politics and Childhood in Postwar America, 1945–1960 (University Press of Kansas; 2014) 224 pages; emphasis on the growing role of politics and federal policy
- Illick, Joseph E. American Childhoods (2002).
- Jenkins, Henry. Where the Wild Things Were: Boyhood and Permissive Parenting in Postwar America. (2025). New York University Press.
- Klapper, Melissa R. Small Strangers: The Experiences of Immigrant Children in America, 1880–1925 (2007) excerpt
- Leal, K. Elise. " 'All Our Children May be Taught of God': Sunday Schools and the Roles of Childhood and Youth in Creating Evangelical Benevolence." Church History (2018). 87(4), 1056–1090. doi:10.1017/S0009640718002378
- Marten, James, ed. Children and Youth during the Civil War Era (2012) excerpt and text search
- Marten, James. Children and Youth in a New Nation (2009)
- Marten, James. Childhood and Child Welfare in the Progressive Era: A Brief History with Documents (2004), includes primary sources
- Marten, James. The Children's Civil War (2000) excerpt and text search
- Martschukat, Jürgen. American Fatherhood: A History (New York University Press, 2019).
- McDougall, Walter A. “Sputnik, the Space Race, and the Cold War.” Bulletin of the Atomic Scientists 41, no. 5 (1985): 20–25. https://doi.org/10.1080/00963402.1985.11455962.
- Mintz, Steven. Huck's Raft: A History of American Childhood (2004).
- Riney-Kehrberg, Pamela. Childhood on the Farm: Work, Play, and Coming of Age in the Midwest (2005) 300 pages.
- Riney-Kehrberg, Pamela. The Nature of Childhood: An Environmental History of Growing Up in America since 1865 (2014) excerpt and text search
- Smallwood, Mary Anne Norman. "Childhood on the Southern Plains Frontier, 1870-1910" (PhD dissertation, Texas Tech University; ProQuest Dissertations & Theses, 1975. 7617763).
- Steeves, Kathleen Anderson, Philip Evan Bernhardt, James P. Burns, and Michele K. Lombard. "Transforming American Educational Identity after Sputnik." American Educational History Journal 36, no. 1-2 (2009): 71+. Gale Academic OneFile (accessed September 4, 2023). https://link.gale.com/apps/doc/A252849377/AONE?u=anon~bd71bc5c&sid=googleScholar&xid=b6bab69f.
- Tuttle, Jr. William M. Daddy's Gone to War: The Second World War in the Lives of America's Children (1995)
- West, Elliott. Growing Up with the Country: Childhood on the Far Western Frontier (1989)
- West, Elliott, and Paula Petrik, eds. Small Worlds: Children and Adolescents in America, 1850–1950 (1992)
- Zelizer, Viviana A. Pricing the Priceless Child: The Changing Social Value of Children (1994) Emphasis on use of life insurance policies. excerpt

==== Primary sources ====
- Abbott, Grace, ed. The Child and the State (2 vol 1938, 1947)
- Bremner, Robert H. et al. eds. Children and Youth in America, Volume I: 1600–1865 (1970); Children and Youth in America: A Documentary History, Vol. 2: 1866–1932 (2 vol 1971); Children and Youth in America: A Documentary History, Vol. 3: 1933–1973 (2 vol. 1974). 5 volume set

=== Latin America ===
- González, Ondina E. and Bianca Premo. Raising an Empire: Children in Early Modern Iberia & Colonial Latin America (2007) 258p; covers 1500–1800 with essays by historians on orphans and related topics
- Rodríguez Jiménez, Pablo and María Emma Manarelli (coord.). Historia de la infancia en América Latina, Universidad Externado de Colombia, Bogotá (2007).
- Rojas Flores, Jorge. Historia de la infancia en el Chile republicano, 1810–2010, Ocho Libros, Santiago (2010), 830p. online access, full

=== Asia ===
- Bai, Limin. "Children as the Youthful Hope of an Old Empire: Race, Nationalism, and Elementary Education in China, 1895–1915," Journal of the History of Childhood & Youth, March 2008, Vol. 1 Issue 2, pp 210–231
- Cross, Gary and Gregory Smits.. "Japan, the U.S. and the Globalization of Children's Consumer Culture," Journal of Social History, Summer 2005, Vol. 38 Issue 4, pp 873–890
- Ellis, Catriona. "Education for All: Reassessing the Historiography of Education in Colonial India," History Compass, March 2009, Vol. 7 Issue 2, pp 363–375
- Hsiung, Ping-chen. Tender Voyage: Children & Childhood in Late Imperial China (2005) 351pp
- Jones, Mark A. Children as Treasures: Childhood and the Middle Class in Early 20th Century Japan (2010), covers 1890 to 1930
- Platt, Brian. Burning and Building: Schooling and State Formation in Japan, 1750–1890 (2004)
- Raddock, David M. "Growing Up in New China: A Twist in the Circle of Filial Piety," History of Childhood Quarterly, 1974, Vol. 2 Issue 2, pp 201–220
- Saari, Jon L. Legacies of Childhood: Growing Up Chinese in a Time of Crisis, 1890–1920 (1990) 379pp
- Sen, Satadru. Colonial Childhoods: The Juvenile Periphery of India, 1860–1945 (2005)
- Walsh, Judith E.. Growing Up in British India: Indian Autobiographers on Childhood & Education under the Raj (1983) 178pp
- Weiner, Myron. Child and the State in India (1991) 213 pp; covers 1947 to 1991

=== Canada ===
- Sutherland, Neil, Children in English-Canadian Society: Framing the Twentieth-Century Consensus (Toronto: University of Toronto Press, 1976, reprinted 1978).
- Sutherland, Neil. Growing Up: Childhood in English Canada From the Great War to the Age of Television (Toronto: University of Toronto Press, 1997).
- Comacchio, Cynthia. 'Nations are Built of Babies': Saving Ontario's Mothers and Children, 1900 to 1940 (Montreal and Kingston McGill-Queen's University Press, 1993).
- Comacchio, Cynthia. The Dominion of Youth: Adolescence and the Making of a Modern Canada, 1920 to 1950 (Waterloo: Wilfrid Laurier University Press, 2006).
- Myers, Tamara. Caught: Montreal's Modern Girls and the Law (Toronto: University of Toronto Press, 2006).
- Brookfield, Tarah. Cold War Comforts: Canadian Women, Child Safety, and Global Insecurity (Waterloo: Wilfrid Laurier University Press, 2012).
- Gleason, Mona. Normalizing the Ideal: Psychology, Schooling and the Family in Postwar Canada. (Toronto: University of Toronto Press, 1996).
- Gleason, Mona. Small Matters: Canadian Children in Sickness and Health, 1900 to 1940. (Montreal and Kingston: McGill-Queen's University Press, 2013).
- Axelrod, Paul. The Promise of Schooling: Education in Canada, 1800 to 1914. (Toronto: University of Toronto Press, 1997)

=== Global ===
- Olsen, Stephanie, ed. Childhood, Youth and Emotions in Modern History: National, Colonial and Global Perspectives. (2015)

=== Child labour ===
- "Child Employing Industries," Annals of the American Academy of Political and Social Science Vol. 35, Mar., 1910 JSTOR i242607, 32 essays by American experts in 1910
- DiGirolamo, Vincent. Crying the News: A History of America's Newsboys (Oxford University Press, 2019).
- Goldberg, Ellis. Trade, Reputation, and Child Labor in Twentieth-Century Egypt (2004) excerpt and text search ]
- Grier, Beverly. Invisible Hands: Child Labor and the State in Colonial Zimbabwe (2005)
- Hindman, Hugh D. Child Labor: An American History (2002)
- Humphries, Jane. Childhood and Child Labour in the British Industrial Revolution (Cambridge Studies in Economic History) (2011) excerpt and text search
- Kirby, Peter. Child Labour in Britain, 1750–1870 (2003) excerpt and text search
- Mofford, Juliet. Child Labor in America (1970)
- Tuttle, Carolyn. Hard At Work In Factories And Mines: The Economics Of Child Labor During The British Industrial Revolution (1999)

=== Historiography ===
- Cunningham, Hugh. "Histories of Childhood," American Historical Review, Oct 1998, Vol. 103 Issue 4, pp 1195–1208 JSTOR 2651207
- Fass, Paula. "The World is at our Door: Why Historians of Children and Childhood Should Open Up," Journal of the History of Childhood and Youth, Jan 2008, Vol. 1 Issue 1, pp 11–31 on U.S.
- Hawes, Joseph M. and N. Ray Hiner, "Hidden in Plain View: The History of Children (and Childhood) in the Twenty-First Century," Journal of the History of Childhood & Youth, Jan 2008, Vol. 1 Issue 1, pp 43–49; on U.S.
- Hodgson, Jack, "Accessing children’s historical experiences through their art: four drawings of aerial warfare from the Spanish Civil War," Rethinking History, 2021. https://doi.org/10.1080/13642529.2021.1928393
- Hsiung, Ping-chen. "Treading a Different Path? Thoughts on Childhood Studies in Chinese History," Journal of the History of Childhood & Youth, Jan 2008, Vol. 1 Issue 1, pp 77–85
- King, Margaret L. "Concepts of Childhood: What We Know and Where We Might Go," Renaissance Quarterly Volume: 60. Issue: 2. 2007. pp 371+.
- Premo, Bianca. "How Latin America's History of Childhood Came of Age," Journal of the History of Childhood & Youth, Jan 2008, Vol. 1 Issue 1, pp 63–76
- Stearns, Peter N. "Challenges in the History of Childhood," Journal of the History of Childhood and Youth, Jan 2008, Vol. 1 Issue 1, pp 35–42
- Stearns, Peter N. Childhood in World History (2011)
  - Cross, Gary. "Peter Stearns on the History of Childhood and the Family." Journal of Social History 51.3 (2018): 467-475.
- West, Elliott. Growing Up in Twentieth-Century America: A History and Reference Guide (1996)
- Wilson, Adrian (1980). "The Infancy of the History of Childhood: An Appraisal of Philippe Ariès". History and Theory. 19 (2): 132–53. doi:10.2307/2504795. JSTOR 2504795.
