= First Lady of the United States =

Title typically held by wife of the president

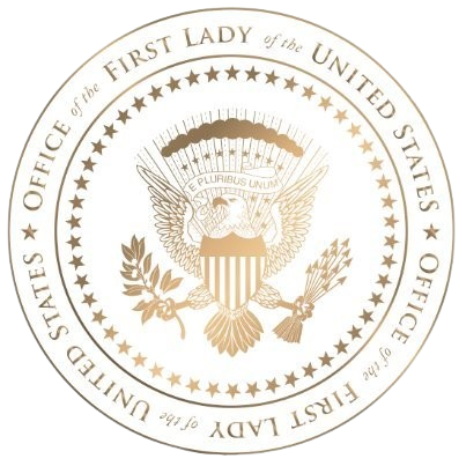
- Seal of the Office of the First Lady

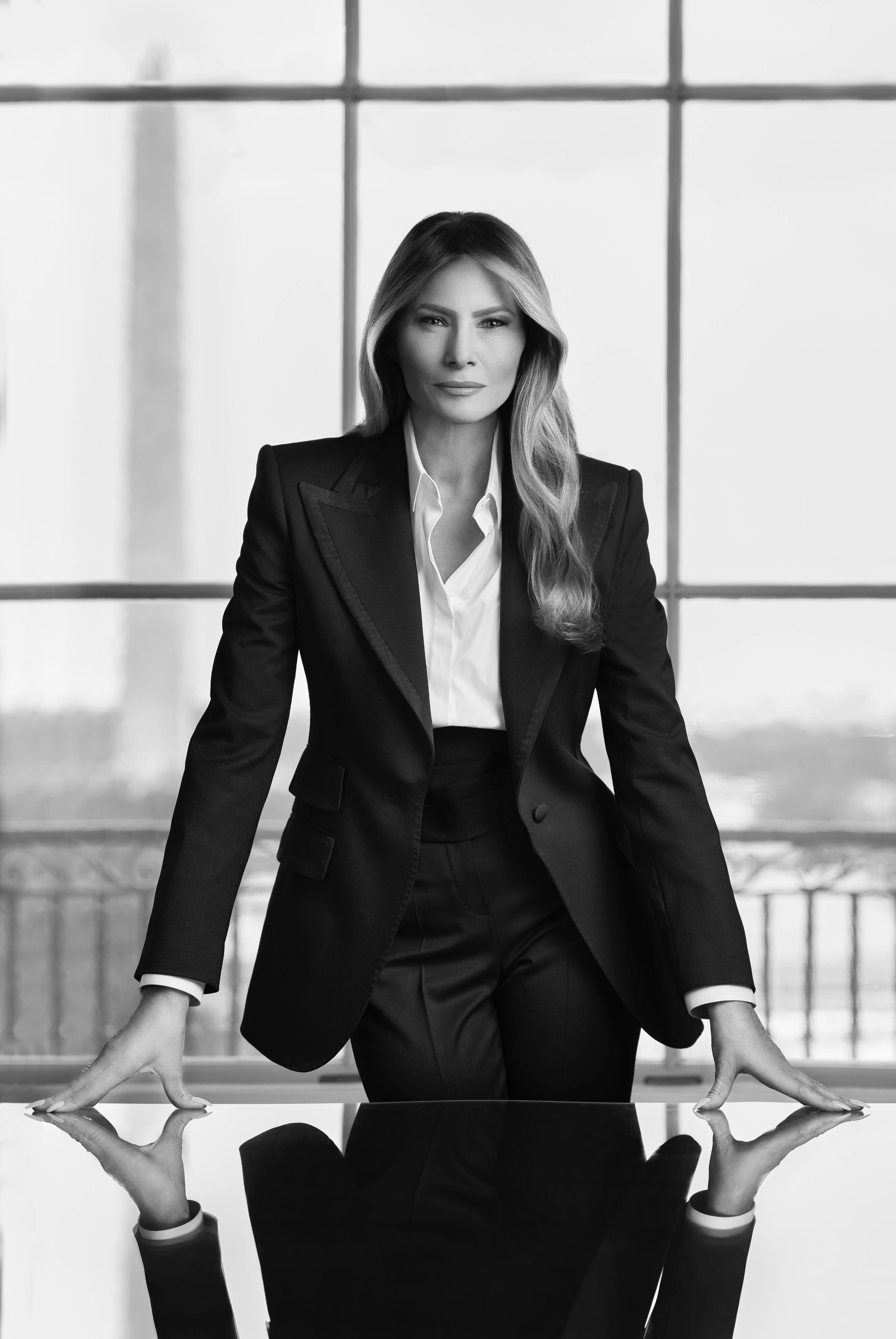
- Current; Melania Trump since January 20, 2025
- Style: Madam First Lady
- Abbreviation: FLOTUS
- Residence: White House
- Inaugural holder: Martha Washington
- Formation: April 30, 1789 (237 years ago)
- Website: Official website

First Lady of the United States (FLOTUS) is a title typically held by the wife of the president of the United States, concurrent with the president's term in office. Although the first lady's role has never been codified or officially defined, she figures prominently in the political and social life of the United States. The first lady of the United States traditionally acts as the hostess of the White House. Historically, when a president has been unmarried or a widower, he has usually asked a relative to act as White House hostess.

While the household always had domestic staff, since the early 20th century, the first lady has been assisted by her event staff, which has grown over the years to include communications, personal, and program staff, who comprise the Office of the First Lady (OFL).

Since the 1900s, the role of first lady has changed considerably. It has come to include involvement in political campaigns, management of the White House, championship of social causes, and representation of the president at official and ceremonial occasions. Additionally, over the years individual first ladies have held influence in a range of sectors, from fashion to public opinion on policy, as well as advocacy for female empowerment. The first lady since January 20, 2025, is Melania Trump, wife of President Donald Trump.

== Origins of the title ==
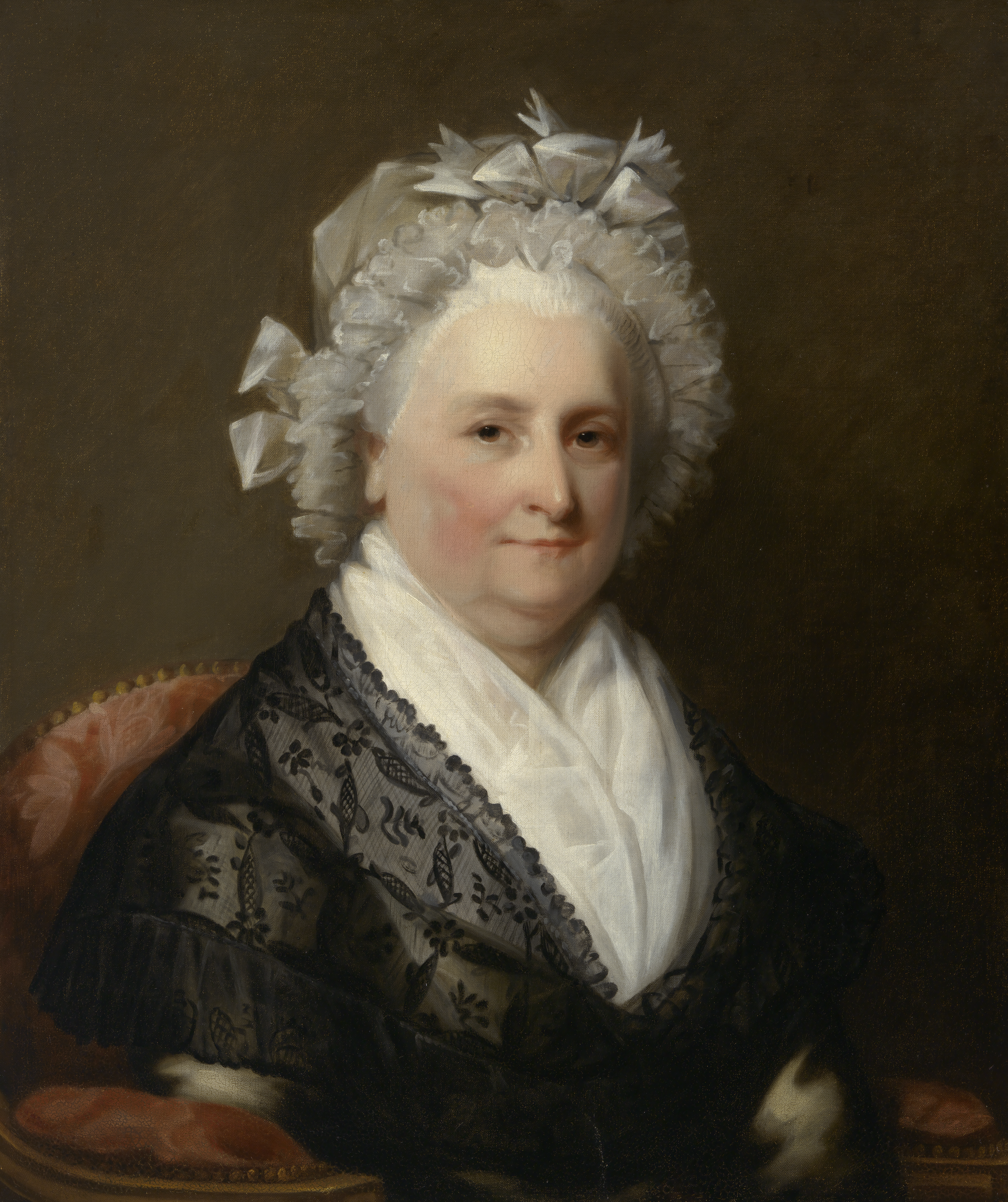
Martha Washington was referred to as "Lady Washington" during her husband's presidency.

The use of the title first lady to describe the spouse or hostess of an executive began in the United States. In the early days of the republic, there was not a generally accepted title for the wife of the president. Many early first ladies expressed their own preference for how they were addressed, including the use of such titles as "Lady", "Mrs. President" and "Mrs. Presidentress"; Martha Washington was often referred to as "Lady Washington". One of the earliest uses of the term "First Lady" was applied to her in an 1838 newspaper article that appeared in the St. Johnsbury Caledonian, the author, "Mrs. Sigourney", discusses how Martha Washington had not changed, even after her husband George became president. She wrote that "The first lady of the nation still preserved the habits of early life. Indulging in no indolence, she left the pillow at dawn, and after breakfast, retired to her chamber for an hour for the study of the scriptures and devotion."

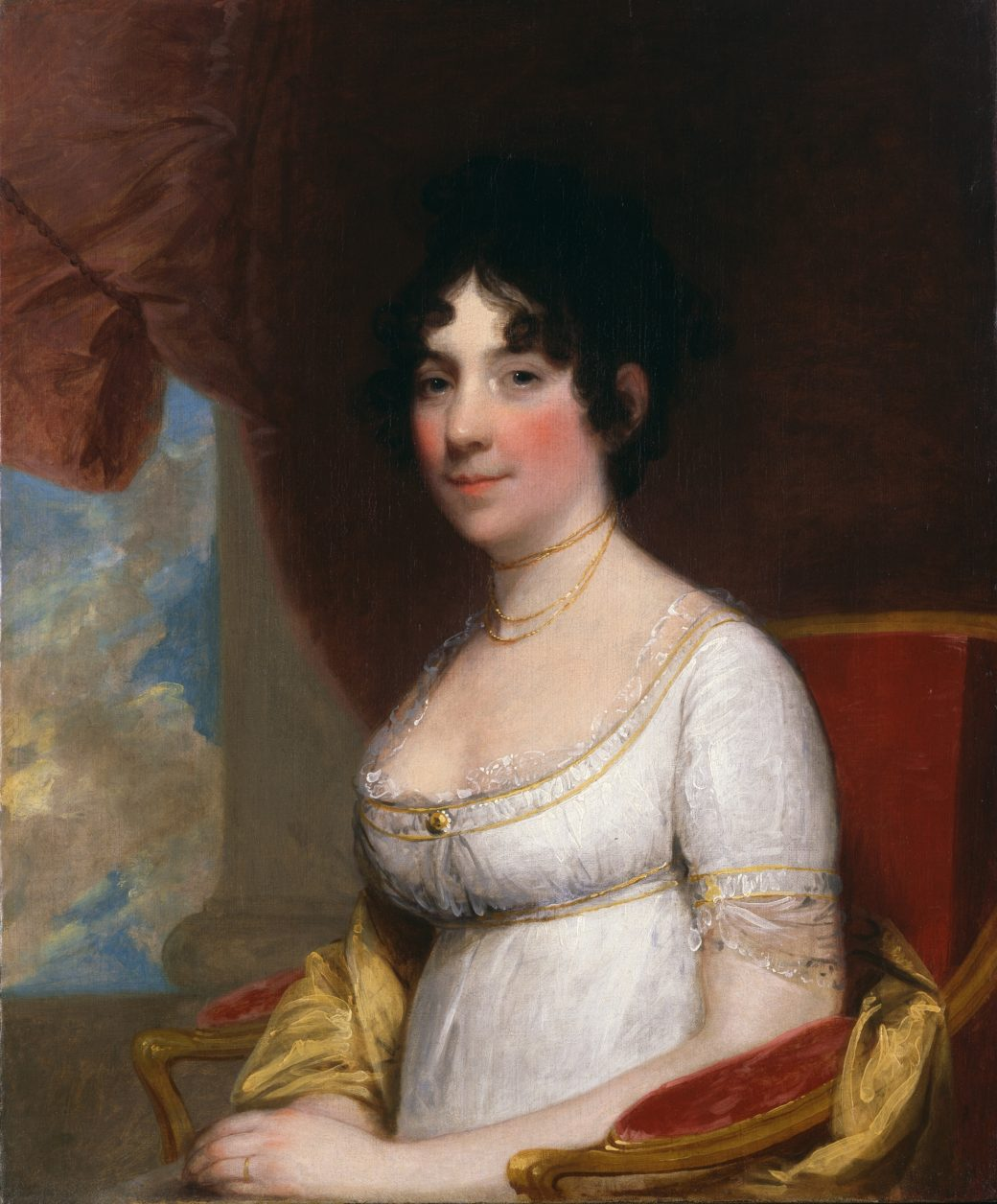
Dolley Madison is said to be the first wife of a president to be referred to as "First Lady" (at her funeral in 1849).

According to popular belief, Dolley Madison was referred to as first lady in 1849 at her funeral in a eulogy delivered by President Zachary Taylor; however, no written record of this eulogy exists, nor did any of the newspapers of her day refer to her by that title. Sometime after 1849, the title began being used in Washington, D.C., social circles. The first person to have the title applied to her while she was actually holding the office was Harriet Lane, the niece of James Buchanan; Leslie's Illustrated Newspaper used the phrase to describe her in an 1860 article about her duties as White House hostess. Another of the earliest known written examples comes from a November 3, 1863, diary entry of William Howard Russell, in which he referred to gossip about "the First Lady in the Land", referring to Mary Todd Lincoln. The title first gained nationwide recognition in 1877, when newspaper journalist Mary C. Ames referred to Lucy Webb Hayes as "the First Lady of the Land" while reporting on the inauguration of Rutherford B. Hayes. The frequent reporting on Lucy Hayes' activities helped spread use of the title outside Washington. A popular 1911 comedic play about Dolley Madison by playwright Charles Nirdlinger, titled The First Lady in the Land, popularized the title further. By the 1930s, it was in wide use. Use of the title later spread from the United States to other nations.

When Edith Wilson took control of her husband's schedule in 1919 after he had a debilitating stroke, one Republican senator labeled her "the Presidentress who had fulfilled the dream of the suffragettes by changing her title from First Lady to Acting First Man". According to the Nexis database, the abbreviation FLOTUS (pronounced /ˈfləʊtɪs/) was first used in 1983 by Donnie Radcliffe, writing in The Washington Post.

=== Non-spouses in the role ===
A number of women (at least thirteen) who were not presidents' wives have served as first lady, as when the president was a bachelor or widower, or when the wife of the president was unable to fulfill the duties of the first lady herself. In these cases, the position has been filled by a female relative of the president, such as Jefferson's daughter Martha Jefferson Randolph, Jackson's daughter-in-law Sarah Yorke Jackson and his wife's niece Emily Donelson, Taylor's daughter Mary Elizabeth Bliss, Benjamin Harrison's daughter Mary Harrison McKee, Buchanan's niece Harriet Lane, Chester A. Arthur's sister Mary Arthur McElroy and Cleveland's sister Rose Cleveland. Some presidents have also had family members temporarily step in while their wives were temporarily unable to fulfill the duties of first lady. This included Susan Ford, who would assist her father with hostess duties while her mother, Betty Ford, was recovering from breast cancer.

=== Potential male title ===
Each of the 45 (Note: Here, "presidents" refers to the 45 people who have held the office and not the 47 presidencies which have occurred. In the numbering of presidencies, Grover Cleveland and Donald Trump are counted twice as they each served twice non-consecutively.) presidents of the United States have been men, and all have either had their wives, or a female hostess, assume the role of first lady. Thus, a male equivalent of the title of first lady has never been needed.

In 2016, as Hillary Clinton became the first woman to win a major party's presidential nomination, questions were raised as to what her husband Bill Clinton would be titled if she were to win the presidency. During the campaign, the title of First Gentleman of the United States was most frequently suggested for Bill Clinton, although as a former president himself, he might have been called "Mr. President". In addition, state governors' male spouses are typically called the first gentleman of their respective state (for example, Michael Haley was the first gentleman of South Carolina while his wife, Nikki, served as governor). Ultimately, Hillary Clinton lost the election, rendering this a moot point.

In 2021, Kamala Harris took office as vice president, making her husband Doug Emhoff the first male spouse of a nationally elected officeholder in the United States. Emhoff assumed the title of second gentleman of the United States ("gentleman" replacing "lady" in the title) making it likely that any future male spouse of a president will be given the title of first gentleman. Harris would later go on to be the Democratic presidential nominee in the 2024 presidential election. Had she won, Emhoff would have been granted the title of first gentleman.

== Role ==
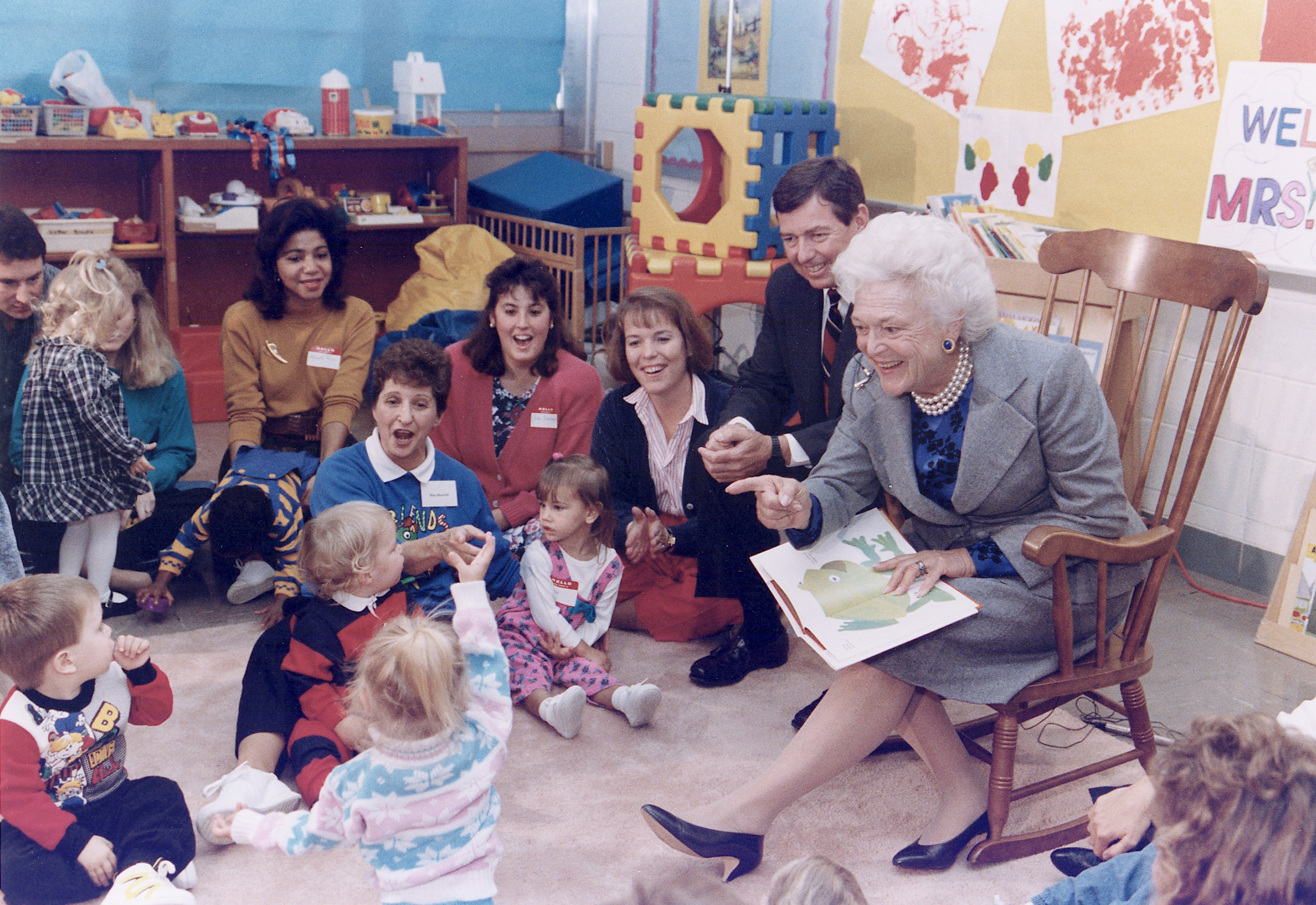
First Lady Barbara Bush, joined by Missouri governor John Ashcroft, with a "Parents as Teachers" group at the Greater St. Louis Ferguson-Florissant School District in October 1991. Mrs. Bush, who championed literacy as first lady, is reading Brown Bear, Brown Bear to the children.

Although the first lady's role has never been codified or officially defined, she figures prominently in the political and social life of the United States. The role of the first lady is neither an elected nor appointed one and is not a position within the United States Government, carrying only ceremonial duties. Nonetheless, first ladies have held a highly visible position in American society. The role of the first lady has evolved over the centuries. She is, first and foremost, the hostess of the White House. She organizes and attends official ceremonies and functions of state either along with, or in place of, the president. Lisa Burns identifies four successive main themes of the first ladyship: as public woman (1900–1929); as political celebrity (1932–1961); as political activist (1964–1977); and as political interloper (1980–2001).

Martha Washington created the role and hosted many affairs of state at the national capital (New York and Philadelphia). This socializing became known as the Republican Court and provided elite women with opportunities to play backstage political roles. Both Martha Washington and Abigail Adams were treated as if they were "ladies" of the British royal court.

Dolley Madison popularized the first ladyship by engaging in efforts to assist orphans and women, by dressing in elegant fashions and attracting newspaper coverage, and by risking her life to save iconic treasures during the War of 1812. Madison set the standard for the ladyship and her actions were the model for nearly every first lady until Eleanor Roosevelt in the 1930s. Roosevelt traveled widely and spoke to many groups, often voicing personal opinions to the left of the president's. She authored a weekly newspaper column and hosted a radio show. Jacqueline Kennedy led an effort to redecorate and restore the White House.

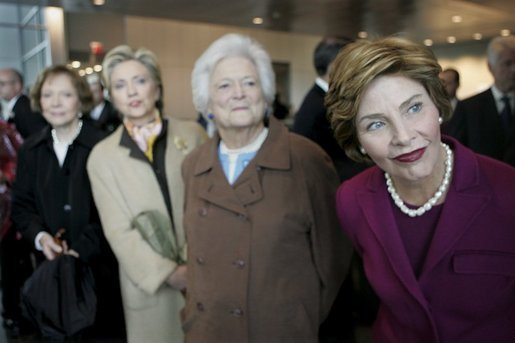
First ladies (from left to right) Rosalynn Carter, Sen. Hillary Clinton, Barbara Bush and first lady Laura Bush at the opening of the Clinton Presidential Center in 2004

Many first ladies became significant fashion trendsetters. Some have exercised a degree of political influence by virtue of being an important advisor to the president.

Over the course of the 20th century, it became increasingly common for first ladies to select specific causes to promote, usually ones that are not politically divisive. It is common for the first lady to hire a staff to support these activities. Lady Bird Johnson pioneered environmental protection and beautification. Pat Nixon encouraged volunteerism and traveled extensively abroad; Betty Ford supported women's rights; Rosalynn Carter aided those with mental disabilities; Nancy Reagan founded the Just Say No drug awareness campaign; Barbara Bush promoted literacy; Hillary Clinton sought to reform the healthcare system in the U.S.; Laura Bush supported women's rights groups, and encouraged childhood literacy. Michelle Obama became identified with supporting military families and tackling childhood obesity; and Jill Biden focused her support on military families and White House history. The current first lady Melania Trump has used her position to help children, including prevention of cyberbullying and support for those whose lives are affected by drugs. She has also used her position as first lady to fight against non-consensual intimate imagery ("revenge porn") or deepfakes posted to online sites and social media applications, typically made with assistance through artificial intelligence, which helped influence the passing of the TAKE IT DOWN Act. Trump has also advocated for improving the lives and well-being of children, including those in foster care.

Since 1964, the incumbent and all living former first ladies are honorary members of the board of trustees of the National Cultural Center, the John F. Kennedy Center for the Performing Arts.

Near the end of her husband's presidency, Hillary Clinton became the first first lady to seek political office, when she ran for United States Senate. During the campaign, her daughter Chelsea took over much of the first lady's role. Victorious, Clinton served as junior senator from New York from 2001 to 2009, when she resigned to become President Obama's secretary of state. Later, she was the Democratic Party nominee for president in the 2016 election, but lost to Donald Trump.

Some first ladies have taken on larger roles in their husbands' administrations. Hillary Clinton played a prominent role in shaping public healthcare policy. Others, like Rosalynn Carter, regularly attended Cabinet meetings, often sitting quietly in the back of the room. More recently, Jill Biden has also participated in Cabinet meetings, stitting at the cabinet table alongside Cabinet officers.

== Office of the First Lady ==
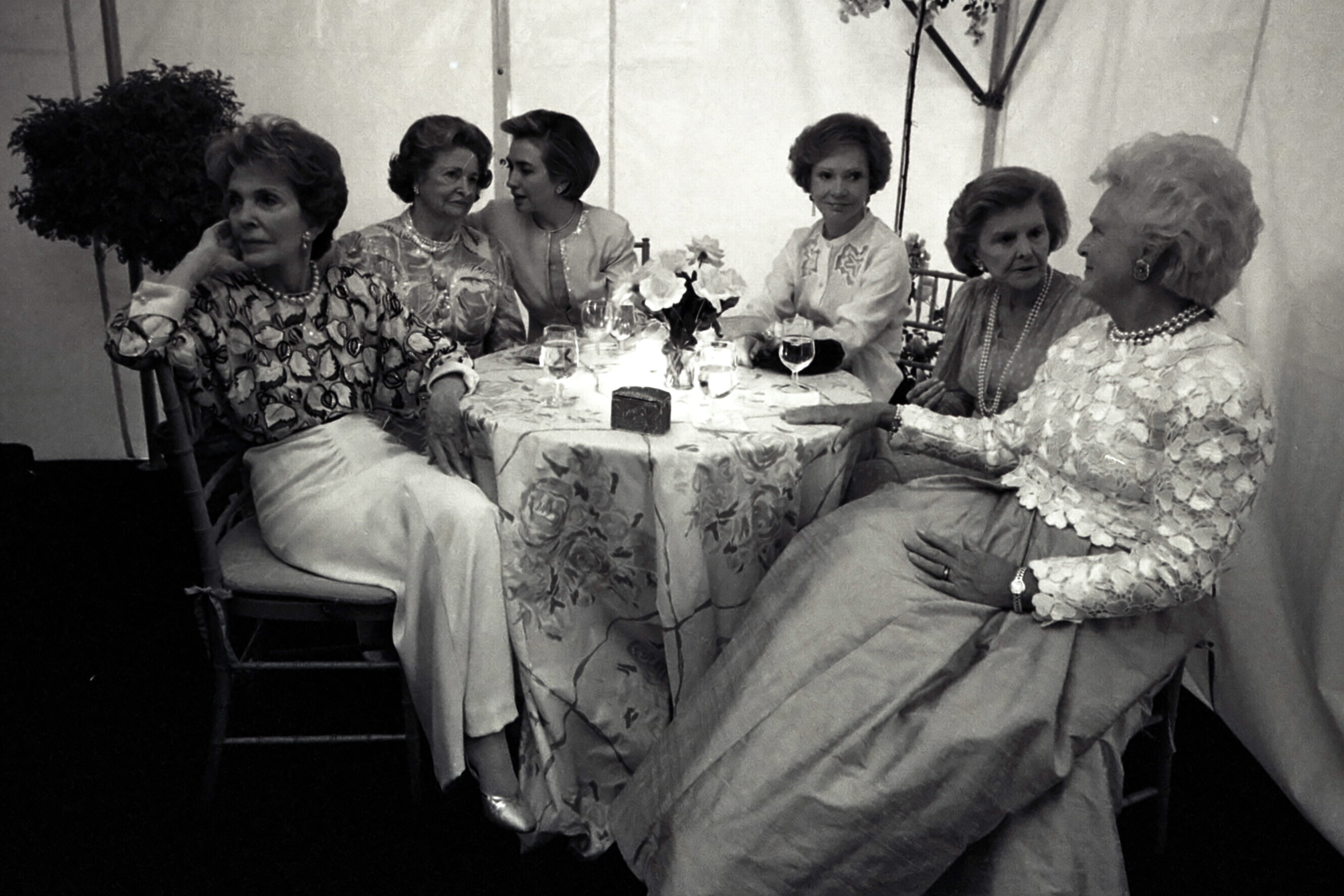
First ladies (from left to right) Nancy Reagan, Lady Bird Johnson, Hillary Clinton, Rosalynn Carter, Betty Ford, and Barbara Bush at the "National Garden Gala, A Tribute to America's First Ladies", May 11, 1994. Jacqueline Kennedy Onassis, absent due to illness, died 8 days after this photograph was taken.

The Office of the First Lady of the United States is accountable to the first lady for her to carry out her duties as hostess of the White House, and is also in charge of all social and ceremonial events of the White House. The first lady has her own staff that includes a chief of staff, press secretary, White House social secretary, and chief floral designer. The Office of the First Lady is an entity of the White House Office, a branch of the Executive Office of the President. When First Lady Hillary Clinton decided to pursue a run for Senator of New York, she set aside her duties as first lady and moved to Chappaqua, New York, to establish state residency. She resumed her duties as first lady after winning her senatorial campaign, and retained her duties as both first lady and a U.S. senator for the seventeen-day overlap before Bill Clinton's term came to an end.

== Collections ==
Established in 1912, the First Ladies Collection has been one of the most popular attractions at the Smithsonian Institution. The original exhibition opened in 1914 and was one of the first at the Smithsonian to prominently feature women. Originally focused largely on fashion, the exhibition now delves deeper into the contributions of first ladies to the and American society. In 2008, "First Ladies at the Smithsonian" opened at the National Museum of American History as part of its reopening year celebration. That exhibition served as a bridge to the museum's expanded exhibition on first ladies' history that opened on November 19, 2011. "The First Ladies" explores the unofficial but important position of first lady and the ways that different women have shaped the role to make their own contributions to the presidential administrations and the nation. The exhibition features 26 dresses and more than 160 other objects, ranging from those of Martha Washington to Melania Trump, and includes White House china, personal possessions and other objects from the Smithsonian's unique collection of first ladies' materials.

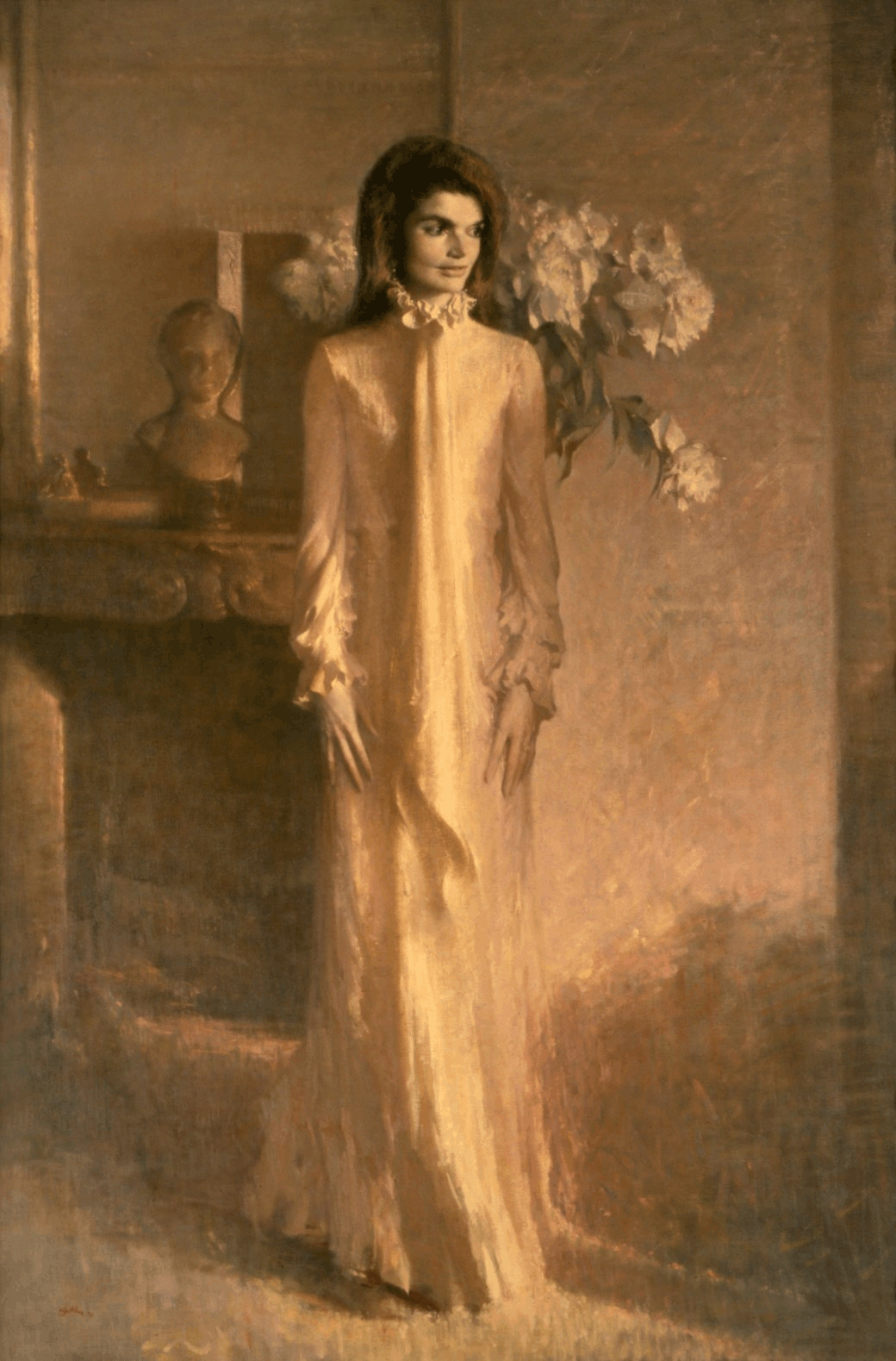
Official portrait of Jacqueline Kennedy at the White House

== Influence ==
Some first ladies have garnered attention for their dress and style. Jacqueline Kennedy Onassis, for instance, became a global fashion icon: her style was copied by commercial manufacturers and imitated by many young women, and she was named to the International Best Dressed List Hall of Fame in 1965. Mamie Eisenhower was named one of the twelve best-dressed women in the country by the New York Dress Institute every year that she was First Lady. The "Mamie Look" involved a full-skirted dress, charm bracelets, pearls, little hats, and bobbed, banged hair. Michelle Obama also received significant attention for her fashion choices: style writer Robin Givhan praised her in The Daily Beast, arguing that the First Lady's style had helped to enhance the public image of the office.

== Causes and initiatives ==
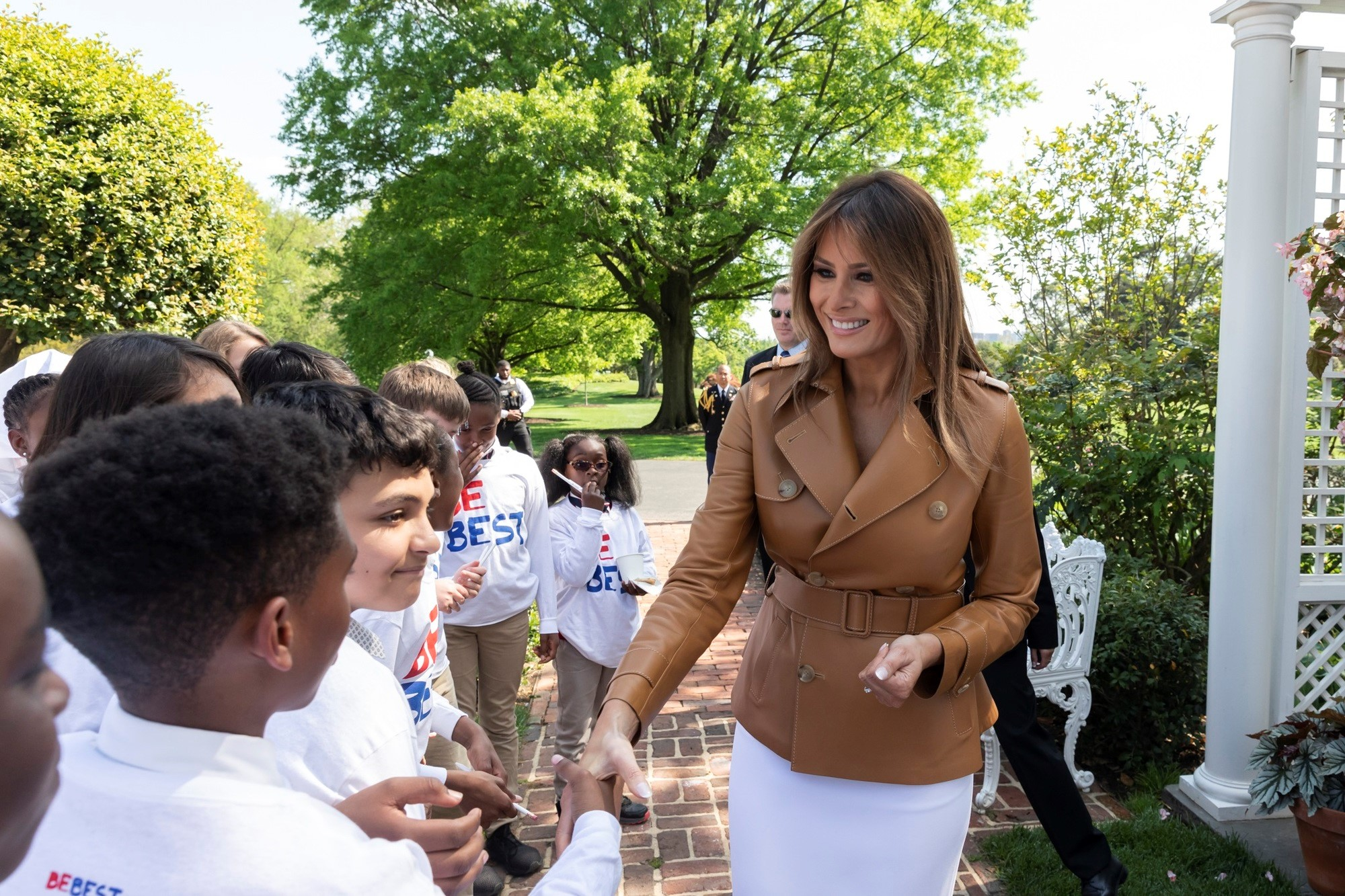
First Lady Melania Trump attending a "Be Best" rally with children

Since the 1920s, many first ladies have become public speakers, adopting specific causes. It also became common for the first lady to hire a staff to support her agenda. Recent causes of the first lady are:

- Lou Henry Hoover:
  - refurbishing of the White House
- Eleanor Roosevelt:
  - Women's rights
  - civil rights
  - humanitarian efforts
- Jacqueline Kennedy:
  - White House restoration and the Arts
- Lady Bird Johnson:
  - Environmental protection and Beautification
- Pat Nixon:
  - Volunteerism
- Betty Ford:
  - Women's rights
  - substance abuse
- Rosalynn Carter:
  - Mental health
- Nancy Reagan:
  - "Just Say No", drug awareness
- Barbara Bush:
  - Childhood literacy
- Hillary Clinton:
  - Healthcare in the United States
- Laura Bush:
  - Childhood literacy
- Michelle Obama:
  - "Let's Move!", reducing childhood obesity
  - "Let Girls Learn", increasing education for girls
- Melania Trump:
  - "Be Best", cyberbullying awareness
  - non-consensual intimate imagery ("revenge porn") and deepfakes awareness
  - foster care reforms
- Jill Biden:
  - "Joining Forces", military families
  - White House History

== See also ==
- First Ladies: Influence & Image
- First Ladies National Historic Site (Canton, Ohio)
- First Spouse $1 Coin Program
- List of current United States first spouses
- Second lady or second gentlemen of the United States
- National First Ladies Day
- Lewis L. Gould, pioneer scholar on First Ladies
