= Survey of Teachers in Pre-Primary Education =

International survey

The Survey of Teachers in Pre-Primary Education (STEPP) is the first international survey for low-and-middle-income countries designed to collect information that is known to affect the quality of pre-primary education from pre-primary teachers and centre heads. The collected information concerns training and professional development, pedagogical and professional practices, working conditions and job satisfaction, and characteristics of pre-primary personnel and the settings in which they work.

The survey offers a valuable opportunity for teachers and centre heads to share views about their practice and needs. It seeks to identify strengths and opportunities for improvement as well as commonalities and differences across participating countries, which will inform policy discussions and development of measures on how to strengthen the quality of pre-primary teachers’ work. Launched in 2016, STEPP is an OECD-UNESCO Joint Initiative in support of the implementation of Sustainable Development Goal (SDG) target 4.2 on early childhood care and education (ECCE).

== First phase of the Survey ==
The first phase of the Survey of Teachers in Pre-primary Education (STEPP) project was implemented by the organization UNESCO from 2016 to 2019, with the participation of seven countries: Dominican Republic, Ghana, Indonesia, Namibia, the Philippines, Togo, and Viet Nam. This phase consisted of instrument development, carried out in several steps, including the pilot study and field trial operations.

STEPP instrumentation consists of three types of paper-based questionnaires: (1) a pre-primary staff questionnaire, (2) a questionnaire for the heads of pre-primary education centres, and (3) a combined questionnaire, used in small pre-primary education centres, and responded to by pre-primary personnel having a combined head-staff role comprising administrative, managerial and pedagogical responsibilities.

=== Addressing the evidence gap ===
To effectively support teachers’ capacity enhancement, professionalization, and motivation, evidence-informed policy interventions are needed. However, there is limited information available on the training and working conditions as well as practices and needs of early childhood teachers, particularly in low-and-middle-income countries. When available, the data is more often system-level/structural information (e.g. number of teachers, teacher-child ratio, teacher qualification) than personnel-level, qualitative information (e.g. what teachers do, how they work, how they interact with children, what challenges they experience in ensuring good quality care and education).

To tackle this evidence gap, the organization UNESCO launched in 2016 the development of this international Survey of Teachers in Pre-primary Education, in cooperation with the OECD and other partners. The survey aims to generate comparative, policy-relevant data and information on four interrelated themes that affect the quality of teaching and learning in early childhood care and education:

- Training and professional development
- Pedagogical and professional practices
- Working conditions and job satisfaction
- Characteristics of personnel and the settings in which they work

The survey will also give an opportunity for ECCE personnel to share perceptions and insights about their work, needs, and challenges.

=== Aspects of teachers addressed in the study ===
The fundamental themes for STEPP include personnel and setting characteristics, their training and professional development, pedagogical and professional practices, working conditions, and job satisfaction.

The target centres for STEPP are institutional (officially registered) settings providing early childhood care and education programmes such as formal education and care for young children from age 3 up to the entry into primary education, also defined as International Standard Classification of Education (ISCED) 2011 Level 0.2 Pre-primary education. In addition, centres must provide educational activities at ISCED Level 0.2 for at least the equivalent of 2 hours per day and 100 days a year to be classified as an eligible centre for this survey and need to support early development of children in the years prior to the start of primary school.

For this survey, ECCE staff members are defined as persons who, as part of their regular duties in the target centre, provide learning opportunities for children in their care. The definition includes creating learning and caring environments aimed at nurturing children's wellbeing and their cognitive, social, and emotional development. It also includes ECCE staff who share their time among different centres, along with ECCE staff who work with children in integrated programmes across ISCED levels, provided they are working at ISCED 0.2 Level. Substitute and emergency personnel - defined as personnel who are temporarily undertaking the activities of regularly employed personnel - are considered out of scope.

Any centre entirely devoted to children with special needs is considered out of scope for this survey. However, personnel working with children with special needs in regular ECCE centres are in scope. The survey format is paper-based with two main questionnaires: one for ECCE staff and one for ECCE centre heads. A combined questionnaire has also been developed for small centres (in some countries) where the ECCE centre head also has pedagogical duties.

== Importance of early childhood care and education (ECCE) ==
Research shows that teachers and educators are the hallmark of quality ECCE. Good teacher training and support, recognition and working conditions are proven to have positive impact on their capacity, motivation and practice with young children, and therefore constitute a critical policy issue. As a fundamental condition for guaranteeing quality education, increasing the supply of qualified teachers at all levels has been designated as one of ten global education targets (SDG target 4.c).

Qualified and trained ECCE staff have a positive impact on children's developmental outcomes. They engage in caring, stimulating and responsive interactions with young children, and give adequate and timely attention to their health and well-being needs. When children are cared by ECCE staff with higher education and specialised training, they are more sociable, have higher cognitive abilities, make developed use of language and motor skills, and are more likely to be ready for school at an appropriate age. Teachers with better education and training perform more curriculum related activities on early literacy and numeracy, and engage children in play-based activities. Moreover, they are more likely to possess child-centred beliefs and engage in effective pedagogical practices which is directly linked with better learning outcomes.

In addition to adequate education and training, ECCE personnel requires reasonable working conditions – including salary, child/staff ratios, group sizes, and the adequacy of teaching-learning materials and environment – to be effective. Such factors are shown to affect teachers’ competences and practices, which in turn impact child outcomes. Furthermore, the presence of skilled leaders and managers of ECCE centres is important, as they can support teachers in better organising the pedagogical curriculum to sustain a shared understanding of children's learning experience and care among the personnel, and to provide feedback on their work. Together with pedagogical staff, they can also encourage parent and community engagement in ECCE, and facilitate reaching out to professionals who can provide specialised support in assisting children with special needs.

Despite the important role of ECCE personnel, many are inadequately prepared, are relatively poorly paid, and lack recognition. Almost one-quarter of 80 low-and-middle-income countries reported that less than half of their pre-primary teachers met national training requirements in 2009. There is a lack of teachers, particularly qualified ones, in remote, rural, and marginalised regions. This is highly problematic, as children living in such regions are the ones in most need of quality ECCE, which can compensate for the disadvantages they are facing.

== Conclusion and next steps ==
The participating countries of STEPP have gathered survey administration experience thorough this project, particularly on running large-scale surveys and national quality monitoring. The countries built considerable capacity with support from the Australian Council for Educational Research consortium. For some of them, it was the first time they had implemented a survey of this scale. The National Teams are all eager to learn from the outcomes of Phase 1 so that they can improve the main survey implementation.

The organization UNESCO is currently in the course of developing a resource mobilization strategy for the second phase of the STEPP project – i.e. main survey, which will generate evidence and insights upon which to formulate concrete improvement measures in favour of quality teaching workforce – that will involve close consultation and coordination with the participating countries and partners.

== See also ==
- Early childhood education
- History of early childhood care and education
- Teacher education

== Sources ==
This article incorporates text from a free content work. Licensed under CC-BY-SA IGO 3.0. Text taken from Survey of teachers in pre-primary education (STEPP): lessons from the implementation of the pilot study and field trial of international survey instruments, Ahmed, Syeda Kashfee; Walker, Maurice; Kaga, Yoshie, UNESCO.
