= Childhood in literature =

Theme of writing

Childhood in literature is a theme within writing concerned with depictions of adolescence. Childhood writing is often told from either the perspective of the child or that of an adult reflecting on their childhood. Novels either based on or depicting childhood present social commentaries rooted in the views and experiences of an individual. Childhood literature often offers moral imperative for the reader to combine social codes with entertainment.

== History ==
Following the publication of French historian Philippe Ariès' work Centuries of Childhood in 1960 (translated to English in 1962), the notion of childhood has been an active topic for social debate. In his work, Ariès argues that the notion of childhood is a recent development. He cites a range of historical media, including paintings and records. Though the social concept of childhood as a distinct phase of human life originates from the 16th century, the social perceptions of childhood have changed markedly in art, literature, and philosophy. Considering the long history of ideologies regarding children, the distinct recognition of childhood was revolutionary.

Scholar Nicholas Orme presents a contrasting thesis to Ariès. He cites a variety of "literary, documentary, pictorial and archaeological sources" to propose that childhood and children's culture appear during the Middles Ages in England. The evidence of distinct responsibilities for youth during the Middle Ages differentiates children from adults and demonstrates the burgeoning distinction between adolescence and maturity. The early separation of childhood and adulthood in the Middle Ages mirrors other dichotomies prevalent in society (e.g, men and women, or slaves and masters).

In the 17th century, John Locke's writings were of considerable influence on the evolving notions of childhood, particularly concerning the development and education of youth. One of the central ideas of Locke's works is the concept that, upon birth, children possess no innate qualities and instead acquire attributes based upon the environment of their upbringing. As an educator of wealthy children, Locke ceded the role of birth order and social status in the personalities of children, with the resultant disparities between affluent and poor youth necessitating a multitude of educational needs that are sensitive to the individual child. As such, pedagogical practices around this period evolved based upon tenets within Locke's writings. Moreover, social perspectives grew to view children as rational, and acknowledgement of childhood intelligence spread throughout public consciousness.

The Age of Enlightenment in the 18th century saw a surge in philosophical writings that dominated European discourse. Philosopher Jean-Jacques Rousseau wrote extensively on the concept of childhood and education, notably in his treatise Emile, or On Education, and was influential in notions of humanity's progress and development. Rousseau's works depict him as a proponent for natural education that is contingent on inclination rather than social structures and enforced habits, seeking to get rid of the tension between "nature and society". Pedagogical practices of the time were greatly impacted by his criticism of traditional educational processes that rejected natural predispositions and his support for emotional guidance for children alongside the conventional intellectual tutelage.

Children's literature, alongside its depictions of childhood, was pioneered by several authors throughout the mid-eighteenth century and primarily included "what would come to be known, towards the end of the century, as 'moral tales'".

== Definition ==
A nonacademic definition of childhood is provided by UNICEF wherein childhood is "a precious time in which children should live free from fear, safe from violence and protected from abuse and exploitation". They also state that "Childhood means much more than just the space between birth and the attainment of adulthood", and is instead the situation of early formative years, particularly regarding the quality of an adolescent's life, and emphasizes the significance of this period in emotional development and education. With much cultural variation, childhood is viewed as the period of youth up until around age 16, with the notion of being a child carrying a variety of parliamentary and legal connotations, or is seen as closely related to progression through schooling and the completion of a secondary education.

Constructions of childhood within literature are used to explore the ways in which strange stimuli develop into familiarity throughout adolescence, manipulating that which is considered ordinary, as well as unusual phenomena. Childhood is moreover used by authors as a personal process through which an individual relocates the lost self by highlighting a distance between childhood in the past and the reality of adulthood.

Within academia, however, childhood is understood to be an abstract concept, with depictions within literature not being standardized and thus having varied definitions based on cultural influence. Examples of cultural influences include economic, philosophical, religious and other socially historical events. Early definitions of childhood see adolescents being treated as "miniature" adults. Childhood is often coupled with connotations of incompleteness and imperfection, both of which are supposedly achieved through a transition into adulthood, and thus children are socially obligated to partake in educational practices.

== The orphan child ==
The orphan archetype is common throughout literary works, particularly in children's literature dating from the 19th and 20th centuries, and has roots within folktales and lore across a variety of cultures. The orphan child is often written to be isolated, ultimately a character out of place in a trial-filled world through which they must navigate.

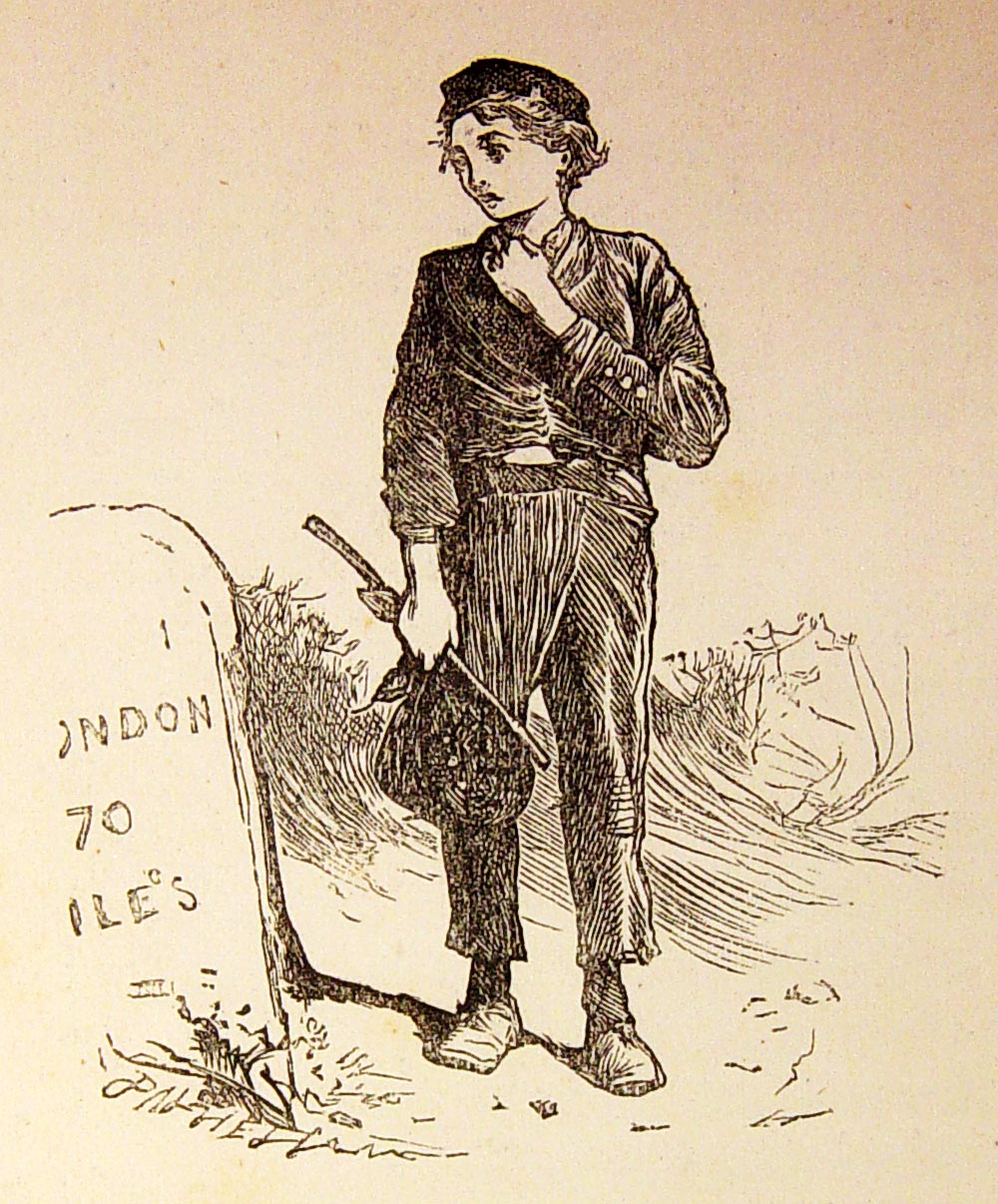
An illustration of Oliver Twist, a famous example of an orphan within literature.

One explanation of the common appearance of orphans in literature is that it reflects the high death rates of earlier centuries and that this mortality rate met at a conjuncture in time with the growth of children's literature to produce a large number of orphan protagonists.

English and creative writing professor Laura Peters posits that, during the Victorian age, cultural systems and social constructions became reorganized to place the notion of family as a "building block" around which society was framed. As such, a variety of authors were drawn to writing on the topic of orphan-hood, as these parent-less children were on the outside of this newly fundamental social structure, thus constituting the potential for interesting and complex depictions of childhood. Orphans within literature symbolize, on a whole, detachment from both other people and the most fundamental social unit of a family; they are "the eternal Other" and categorized as outsiders seeking (or avoiding) incorporation into regular society.

Although orphan children are often depicted as solitary and lonely, as to construct an empathetic character, many portrayals are also written with special powers they must use in order to achieve eventual social inclusion and happiness; in Harry Potter, the titular protagonist is an orphan oppressed by his relatives and social expectation whilst also being the "chosen one" tasked with combating the great evil within the series.

The loss of an orphan's parents within literature is often depicted as a motivational trauma by which they are propelled to pursue their goal.

== Models of childhood ==
Models of childhood have changed, evolved and overlapped throughout time. The use of these models in children's literature can offer opportunity for critical analysis of the representation of childhood in literature over time.

The Romantic Child: children portrayed as being more virtuous and insightful than adults and embodying innocence.

The Sinful Child: often depicts child as being corrupted by original sin often used to exemplify cultural and personal fears

The Working Child: depicts children as economically valuable and offering practical utility

The Sacred Child: children represented as precious, fragile, and requiring protection

The Child as Radically Other: presents children as inherently different from adults rather than as a developing adult

The Developing Child: depicts the progression from child to adult and the facilitation this transformation

The Child as Miniature Adult: characterizes children with the characteristics adulthood and capacities of adults

The representations of childhood in literature is influenced and often reflects the dominant perception of childhood in the era it was written. Author of Reading Children's Literature: A Critical Introduction, Carrie Hintz notes that there are differences among children from the same time period depending on their individual context such as race, gender, or place and these differences should be considered when focusing on the historical changes of children and the representation of childhood in literature.

== Coverage in scholarship ==
Large amounts of academic writing on childhood are based upon the works of philosophers and historians such as John Locke, Jean-Jacques Rousseau, and Philippe Ariès. The work of the lattermost scholar, Centuries of Childhood, is a widely cited text within spheres of child and literary studies, with scholars often discussing the ramifications of the distinctive separation of childhood and adulthood, or altogether rejecting Ariès' thesis.

Ariès' proposition about the history of childhood has been rejected by some scholars on the basis that the idea was too quickly accepted into academic study without being comprehensively scrutinized and tested, thus becoming "dogma by dint of repetition". Instead of the brutal child-rearing practices and a supposed indifference parents felt toward children prior to the 16th century, scholar Stephen Wilson writes that children in pre-modern societies such as China, South India, and Europe were often nurtured during upbringing and grieved over upon death and were furthermore treated in a distinct fashion compared to adults. Further criticisms contend that Centuries of Childhood conflates the absence of a modern understanding of childhood with an overall lack of awareness in pre-16th century societies, with Ariès' "present-centeredness" disabling proper historiographical analysis, rendering his thesis logically flawed. The use of artwork to qualitatively infer the beginning of notions of childhood has also motivated scholars to criticize Ariès' thesis; the assumption that illustrations explicitly depict the realities of life ignores the "possibility of any ambiguity", and further neglects of experiences of poorer civilians who did not have the means to commission such artwork.

One of the most notable ideas regarding childhood and child development, originally formulated by John Locke in his 1690 work An Essay Concerning Human Understanding, is the notion of tabula rasa, which refers to the mind of a child as a "blank slate", having no preconceived ideologies, thoughts or knowledge at birth; thus, children are free to be molded as a part of their cultural surroundings and are a result of their respective situations and environments throughout development. This idea that children receive beliefs and knowledge from external stimuli distinguishes instinctual actions and faculties from understanding that is received through education and deliberate tutelage. Although he postulates that there is nothing intrinsic to the mind of a children upon birth, Locke also highlights the "natural inclinations" of children, such as their personalities, that should be paid attention to when nurturing and molding a developing youth.

Within early discussions regarding childhood, the notion of a child's rationality was a point of contention. While John Locke was a proponent of the notion that children's intellect should be viewed with a degree of respect, Jean-Jacques Rousseau wrote that "Childhood is reason's sleep", and that proper judgement and moral codes are lost on youth before they have reached the "age of reason". Contemporary discourse heavily features the latter concept, explicating that children are incapable of the standards of rational sense and sociality that accompany maturity, and their true intellectual potential and cognitive powers are only unlocked after the transition into a "mature adult".

== Notable works ==
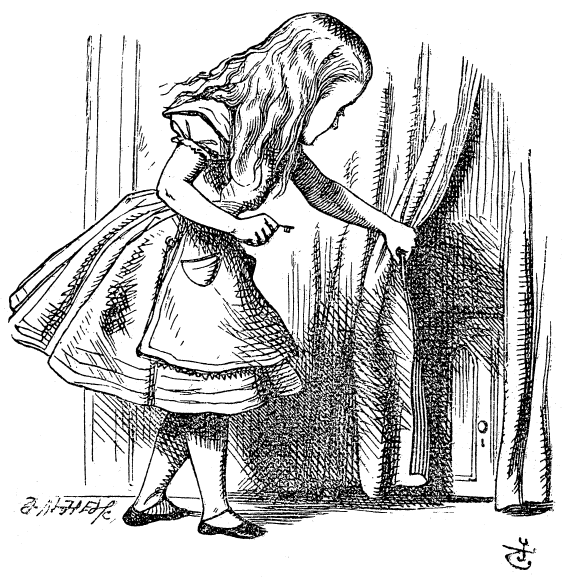
An illustration composed by Sir John Tenniel for the 1865 edition of Alice's Adventures in Wonderland, in which Alice discovers a small door behind a curtain.

The History of Little Goody Two-Shoes, by John Newbery – One of the first full-length novels depicting a child as the protagonist and the main character, dealing with orphan-hood and education.

Oliver Twist, by Charles Dickens – Focuses on themes of child neglect, child abuse, child labour and orphan-hood, whilst also delivering social commentaries on the Victorian Age in regards to legal systems and the exploitation of children during the 19th century.

Alice's Adventures in Wonderland, by Lewis Carroll – Deals with the development of an individual's identity throughout childhood, and the relationship between identity and cultural and social circumstances. The novel explores the transitional period of adolescence in the Victorian Era through the fantasy genre.

Anne of Green Gables, by L. M. Montgomery – A novel about a young orphan who is forced to mature and develop self-agency due to her restrictive environment, with austere Protestant values necessitating an exploration of childhood identity.

Harry Potter series, by J. K. Rowling – Magical fantasy narrative following a boy wizard, deals with orphan-hood, friendship and the development of relationships, child prodigies, and the dichotomies between childhood and adulthood.
