= Medieval Children =

Book by Nicholas Orme

- Author: Nicholas Orme

Medieval Children is a 2001 book on the history of childhood written by English historian Nicholas Orme. It covers aspects of English children throughout the Middle Ages. The book addresses what is considered Philippe Ariès's central thesis in Centuries of Childhood, that there was no medieval understanding of childhood as a phase, an idea that critics have said Orme refutes successfully.

== Synopsis ==
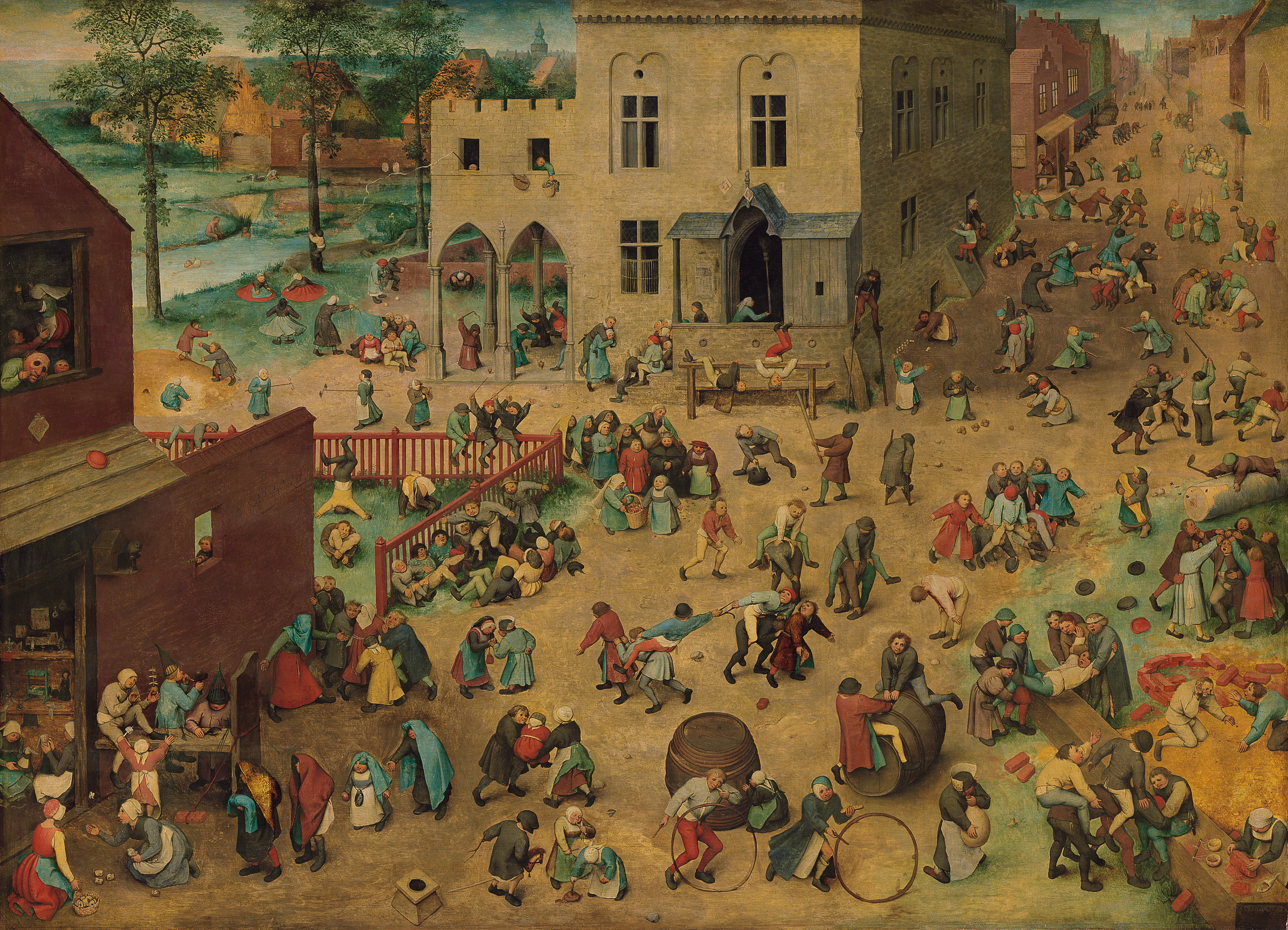
Children's Games, 1560, Pieter Bruegel the Elder

"It cannot be over-emphasized that there is nothing to be said for Aries's view of childhood in the middle ages. ... Aries's views were mistaken: not simply in detail but in substance. It is time to lay them to rest."

— Nicholas Orme, Medieval Children

The book uses a wide range of sources to refute Philippe Ariès's Centuries of Childhood famous theses of the medieval nonexistence of "childhood" as an idea and of apathetic medieval parenting. Orme states that childhood was a phase distinct from the rest of life, "medieval children were ourselves, five hundred or a thousand years ago" with parents who genuinely cherished and grieved for their children, similar to modern parents. The book's refutation of Ariès is diffuse, broaching his thesis but not other aspects of Centuries of Childhood. Orme uses examples from the English Middle Ages where Ariès uses the French. Orme's source materials include primers, journals, coroners' records, and shoes.

Orme shows childhood to be expensive, with clothing like bibs and swaddlebands alongside books and community expenses. Children were breastfed and given special shoes to wear and items to chew.

== Reception ==
Critics Stephen Metcalf and Benjamin Schwarz separately agreed that the book successfully dismantled Ariès's thesis, its primary goal. The Atlantic's Benjamin Schwarz called the book "a model of accessible scholarly history" and lauded its illustrations for an academic work. Slate's Stephen Metcalf praised the book for its scholarship and utility, but criticized the book's timing and lack of imagination. He adds that Orme's language is "phlegmatic and common-sensical" where Ariès was "oracular and tendentious", which was used to make the era appear familiar or alien, respectively. The Economist criticized the exclusion of females from the book.
