= Western Attitudes Toward Death from the Middle Ages to the Present =

1975 essay by Philippe Ariès

- Author: Philippe Ariès
- Translator: Patricia M. Ranum
- Language: English
- Genre: History
- Publisher: Johns Hopkins University Press
- Publication date: 1974
- Publication place: United States
- Pages: 111 (paperback)
- Preceded by: Centuries of Childhood
- Followed by: L'homme Devant la Mort

Western Attitudes Toward Death from the Middle Ages to the Present was French historian Philippe Ariès's first major publication on the subject of death, it was published in 1974. Ariès was well known for his work as a medievalist and a historian of the family, but the history of death was the subject of his work in his last decade of scholarly life. Ariès wrote several major books and articles on death mentalities and is credited with introducing death as a topic for historical inquiry. Western Attitudes Toward Death began as a series of lectures presented to Johns Hopkins University, which he gave for the express purpose of translation and publication. Because Ariès saw America as influential in changing the way the western world viewed death, he felt it was important to have his ideas circulating on both sides of the Atlantic. Covering over a millennium of history, Ariès divided Western Attitudes Toward Death into four separate periods, which make up the four major sections of the book: Tamed Death, One’s Own Death, Thy Death, and Forbidden Death.

== Tamed Death ==
In his first chapter, he discusses the first period, "Tamed Death", using a number of ancient texts and medieval romances. He argues that prior to the seventeenth century, people were acutely aware of their own imminent death, prepared for it, and accepted it. True to his roots as a medieval historian, he cites examples such as of King Ban, Tristan, and Lancelot—these characters are shown facing death while knowing that 'their time has come' and prepare themselves by following prescribed rituals. These rituals were often religious such as Lancelot positioning the body to be facing Jerusalem. The dying man readied his body and soul for death and waited.

There were four general characteristics: first, the dying person would usually be lying in bed, or at least in a recumbent position. In the Christian tradition the dying person would lie on his or her back, facing the heavens. Second, the dying person in this period always presided over his death and understood its accompanying religious rituals and protocol. The priest was not brought until he was called for, and loved ones did not say goodbye until the dying person consented. Third, death was a public ceremony and parents, spouses, family, neighbors and even children were present at the bedside. Death was seen as normal and it was customary for loved ones to witness the occasion. Finally, while accepted and witnessed, it lacked "theatrics" and a "great show of emotions". Ariès explains his choice of "Tamed Death" as a title is meant to contrast with the "wild" death of the twentieth century, in which people fear and avoid death.

In this early medieval period people were not concerned with what would happen to their bodies after death. For superstitious reasons they did not want the dead to be buried in cities or near the houses of the living, but if the body was buried in a churchyard and remained under the church's protection, little else mattered. People did not believe that the grave should be permanent (especially the graves of the poor) and ossuaries were very common. Moreover, the burial grounds were common meeting places where dancing, gambling, and even commerce took place.

== One's Own Death ==
Subtle changes in western people's attitudes toward death occurred around the eleventh and twelfth centuries. Ariès titled this mentality shift: "One's Own Death". The defining feature of this era was a new personalization of death, in which the individual rather than the act of death itself came to the forefront. Ariès notes four major indicators that signify this change.

He explains that in the previous era, the Christian tradition of Last Judgment separated believers and non-believers after death. Christians alleged that during the second coming of Christ believers would be resurrected in Paradise, while non-believers would cease to exist. However, by the twelfth century Ariès observes that Last Judgment had taken on new meaning. It came to signify judgment passed on one's soul after the moment of death. In the new Christian tradition, people believed that after death their good and bad deeds would be weighed against each other, and based on those deeds they would be either damned or admitted immediately into heaven. This made death more personal and individual. Ariès notes that the actual moment of death began to gain greater significance, as Christians believed that a person's deathbed behavior and personal reflection on their own deeds, at the moment of death, could influence heavenly judgment. As in the previous era friends and family were often present, but their presence became more closely tied to witnessing the moment before judgment rather than simply witnessing death.

Finally, in this era, depictions of corpses and skeletons became more prevalent, and individual tombs with inscriptions grew in popularity. Although religious artwork had featured macabre themes in the past, by the seventeenth century there was an influx of artwork that featured decaying cadavers and the physical body after death. Ariès argues that this artwork was meant to warn against moral corruption and also express love of life. He states that men of that era felt a "love of life which we today can scarcely understand", due to our increased longevity. Ariès also notes that by the thirteenth century individual tombs with inscriptions were becoming more typical, especially for the religious elite and royalty. Although during the Roman period individual graves had not been uncommon, this practice had faded during the Middle Ages. By the eighteenth century, the middle and lower classes were also likely to have tombs, or at least plaques, marked with individual inscriptions. As people became more conscious of their individual place in the world, their death reflected that awareness

== Thy Death ==
By the early eighteenth century, Ariès observed an abrupt change in the western person's attitude toward death. Death was dramatized, exalted, feared, and in some cases worshipped. Looking to themes in artwork from the sixteenth to eighteenth centuries, Ariès argues that death became categorically similar to sex, and was seen as a break from the ordinary. Although the erotic associations with death did not last beyond that short period, he maintains that death was no longer normalized. People did not look at death as a familiar occasion that was part of life, as they had in the past. Although people continued to participate socially and ritualistically in death, and crowds still flocked to the bedside of a dying person, their purpose had changed. Instead of witnessing death, they mourned it.

Although mourning was not completely new in the eighteenth and nineteenth centuries, Ariès argues that it became unregulated. It was less of a ritualized social obligation, and more of a spontaneous and often excessive display of emotions. Ariès maintains that survivors no longer accepted the death of friends and loved ones. He states that people of this period lamented that death was a complete rupture from life and were consoled by preserving the memory of the deceased. Memorializing the dead became an important feature of the period of "thy death".

There was also a renewed interest in burial grounds and grave markers. In the past Christians had been content to relinquish bodies to the care of the church. Even when gravestones became more prevalent, Ariès argues that they were predominantly an expression of individuality or representative of individual donations to the church. However, by the eighteenth century, bodies were buried away from the church in individual cemetery plots, where people felt they could commiserate with the dead and cultivate their memory. Ariès also observes that while all western people celebrated cemeteries and their new role in society, France, Italy, and Germany are known for more elaborate tombs and burial sites when compared to the simple style of North America, the UK, and Northwestern Europe. He suggests that this trend is due to economic inequalities; poorer nations were more inclined to build elaborate tombs as a statement against the elegant simplicity that wealthier nations promoted. Ariès also notes that because the countries that favored more ornate tombs were also Catholic, it later became indicative of religion.

== Forbidden Death ==
The final period Ariès demarcates in the evolution of western attitudes toward death is the era of "forbidden death". Beginning in the very late nineteenth and early twentieth centuries, Ariès argues that a "brutal revolution" occurred in western attitudes toward death, in which death became both shameful and forbidden. While this trend began in the United States – spreading to Britain, Northwestern Europe, and eventually the whole of the continent – the bulk of his analysis in this section deals primarily with Britain and Europe. Growing out of the sentimental era of "thy death" in which survivors mourned the death of loved ones openly, spontaneously, and with heightened displays of emotion, it soon became common practice to shield the people actually dying from the reality of their condition. The mourner, so moved by the gravity of death, wished to spare their dying loved one any emotional turmoil. Thus in the era of "forbidden death" the dying man no longer presided over his own death. Soon the extreme emotions that survivors expressed in the previous period were replaced with an equally extreme avoidance of death and suppression of emotion that became dominant in the twentieth century. Ariès names two societal trends that he believes were very influential on shifting attitudes toward death: the advent of the hospital as a place of dying, and a growing sentiment that life should be, above all, happy.

Citing trends in literature, such as the work of Tolstoy, Ariès argues that the feeling surrounding death changed before its actual rituals did. By 1930–1950, he states that the displacement of the site of death from the home to the hospital accelerated changes in attitude. While for most of history the dying person took his or her last breath in bed, surrounded by loved ones, now, in era of "forbidden death" people are more likely to end their lives alone in a hospital bed. Ariès writes that death in the hospital is often a "technical cession" that is predetermined by a hospital team, frequently occurring after the dying person has already lost consciousness. He argues that the moment of death is difficult to distinguish for most survivors because they have already witnessed many "silent deaths" as the dying person loses different abilities – from breathing and eating on their own, to verbal communication and eventually consciousness. He states that in this current period there is no great and dramatic act of death, which was what family, friends, and neighbors used to gather together to witness. Ariès writes: "No one any longer has the strength or patience to wait over a period of weeks for a moment which has lost its meaning." Instead, doctors battle against death and when death finally comes it is usually considered a failure of medicine rather than a normal occurrence.

Ariès's second observation regarding social changes over the late nineteenth and early twentieth centuries was that happiness became the expected dominant emotion. He states that people began to believe "life is always happy or should always seem so." Death, being sorrowful and ugly, was therefore denied. Expressing sadness or emotional turmoil, Ariès argues, is likely to be equated with bad manners, mental instability, and unnecessary morbidity. Referencing anthropologist Geoffrey Gorer, Ariès states that death has replaced sex as western society's greatest taboo. Children are less likely to be shielded from the notion of sex in the modern era, but they are not taught about death. When death occurs a child is told the deceased are "resting" and every effort is made to distract them from the truth. Ariès also argues that the prevalence of cremation in Britain and parts of Europe reflects the western world's denial of death. He states that the act of cremation, with its usual lack of formality, associated rituals, and permanent location for remains, is the ultimate expression of "forbidden death".

Although Ariès states that many of the recent trends regarding death originated in the United States, he argues that Americans have a unique death culture that is an amalgamation of the two extreme periods "thy death" and "forbidden death". He maintains that Americans do deny death as a part of life, and they are equally likely to die alone in hospital, but once death actually occurs Americans have rituals that are all their own. Embalming became common practice in America by the early to mid-twentieth century, and American funerals are distinguished by the "wake" or viewing of the deceased. Ariès maintains that both practices are far less frequent in the rest of the western world. He argues that the embalmed body is not seen as fully dead and Americans believe they can communicate their last words and goodbyes to the deceased at this moment. Funeral directors, he states, market themselves as "doctors of grief" who can see people through the period of mourning and return them to normality after the rituals of death (funeral, wake, burial/cremation) are complete. In this way, Ariès argues, death is sold like any other consumer good. Ariès concludes by stating that the current consensus toward death is that while we are vaguely aware of it, "at heart we feel we are nonmortals".

== Critical reception and influence ==
Ariès's Western Attitudes Toward Death has been applauded in both the field of history and the wider world of academia. Initial reviews celebrated this work as eye-opening, thought-provoking, and the first of its kind. Historian David Stannard, writing for the American Historical Review, noted the book was similar in structure, style and "panoramic vision" to Ariès's earlier works in the history of childhood. Like his earlier works, scholars predicted that Ariès would again ignite a new subfield in history.

One reviewer stated that prior to Ariès's study of death, scholars almost universally projected their own fear of death onto the historical record, believing revulsion toward death was a static mainstay of western history. Another reviewer congratulated Ariès for his masterful application of the “history of mentalities,” to a shockingly overlooked subject. Although not everyone agreed with the Ariès's exact methods and conclusions, reviewers acknowledged the history of death as deserving of further study. Philippe Ariès published frequently on the subject for the remainder of his career, including a revision of Western Attitudes Toward Death, titled The Hour of Our Death, which further separated the period he called “One’s Own Death,” into two separate categories: “The Death of Self,” and “Remote and Imminent Death.” This was done to take into consideration certain economic disparities in the period as well as the impact of the Reformation. Ariès's works on the history of death are now considered seminal and current historians of death rely heavily on his frameworks.

Although Ariès is credited with opening the history of death up to further inquiry, many critics found that his short book spanning over a millennium of subject matter treated the subject too lightly, leaving more questions than answers. He was accused of overgeneralization on a number of counts. Reviewers critiqued his broad treatment of large geographic areas, not accounting for any cultural differences. One critic found that Ariès did not adequately differentiate between rich, poor, rural, and urban groups, and also that he relied too heavily on literature, which can sometimes distort reality. Historians of science and medicine felt their discipline had been overlooked and that changes in medical practice impacted death more than Ariès implied. Roy Porter noted that while Ariès was critical of hospital death, calling it cruel and impersonal, in the nineteenth century many people felt that dying in the care of a doctor was a “good death,” and doctors were heralded for their ability to ease patients' pain in their final hour. Furthermore, Porter argues that the way people die is very much dependent on the disease they are suffering from, and it is difficult to make comparisons and generalize a single mode of death. Finally, although Ariès's periodization of western attitudes toward death was one of his biggest contributions, many critics questioned the periods he established, finding them “vague” or unconvincing.

Since the publication of Western Attitudes Toward Death, Ariès, even by his critics, has been hailed “the doyen of the historians of death.” As predicted by early reviewers, Ariès's work has helped present death as a subject for serious historical inquiry. Generations of historians have since examined attitudes toward death from many vantage points – cultural, racial, socio-economic – providing sharper explanations for attitude shifts in various geographic locations and time periods. The notion of “Forbidden Death” has received particular attention from scholars and critiques of the American funeral industry were popular in the 1960s and 70s. Jessica Mitford's The American Way of Death exposed high profit margins for funeral directors and the large manufacturers that supply the material necessities related to burial (caskets, grave markers, etc.) Similarly, Ivan Illich, a well-known critic of modern medicine, devoted a chapter in his famed work Medical Nemesis to the horrors of hospital death. This chapter, he states “leans heavily on the masterful essays by Philippe Ariès." Although many historians have commented on Ariès's depiction of hospital death, few have commented on Ariès's notion that the modern age is oppressed by its obsession with happiness. Historian Gary Laderman agreed that death has become a “forbidden” subject in recent years, but challenged Ariès, stating: “perhaps the experience of two world wars, particularly the mass destruction of the Holocaust in Europe and the dropping of the atomic bomb in Japan, contributed to this reticence to discuss the subject."

American historians, in the years that followed the publication of Western Attitudes Toward Death, became particularly interested in the deviation Ariès noted between Americans and Europeans. David Stannard, an early reviewer of Ariès's work, penned The Puritan Way of Death a few short years after Ariès's publication. He maintained that American religious practices strongly influenced their attitudes toward death. While he hoped to clarify some of the comments Ariès made about changes in American attitudes, he applauded Ariès's seminal work as both “profound and insightful.” Although Western Attitudes Toward Death has been heavily critiqued, historians of death have venerated it as a classic and foundational work on the subject.
