= Centuries of Childhood =

1960 book by Philippe Ariès

- Author: Philippe Ariès
- Original title: L'enfant et la vie familiale sous l'ancien régime

Centuries of Childhood: A Social History of Family Life (French: L'enfant et la vie familiale sous l'ancien régime; English: lit. "The Child and Family Life during the Ancien Régime) is a 1960 book on the history of childhood by the French historian Philippe Ariès known in English by its 1962 translation. It is considered the most famous book on the subject, and it is known for its argument that the concept of "childhood" is a modern development.

== Synopsis ==
The book argues that childhood as an idea has changed over time. It covers the concepts of childhood, adult–child relations, and childhood experience across cultures and time periods. His most well-known sources are medieval paintings that show children as small adults. Ariès argues that childhood was not understood as a separate stage of life until the 15th century, and children were seen as little adults who shared the same traditions, games, and clothes.

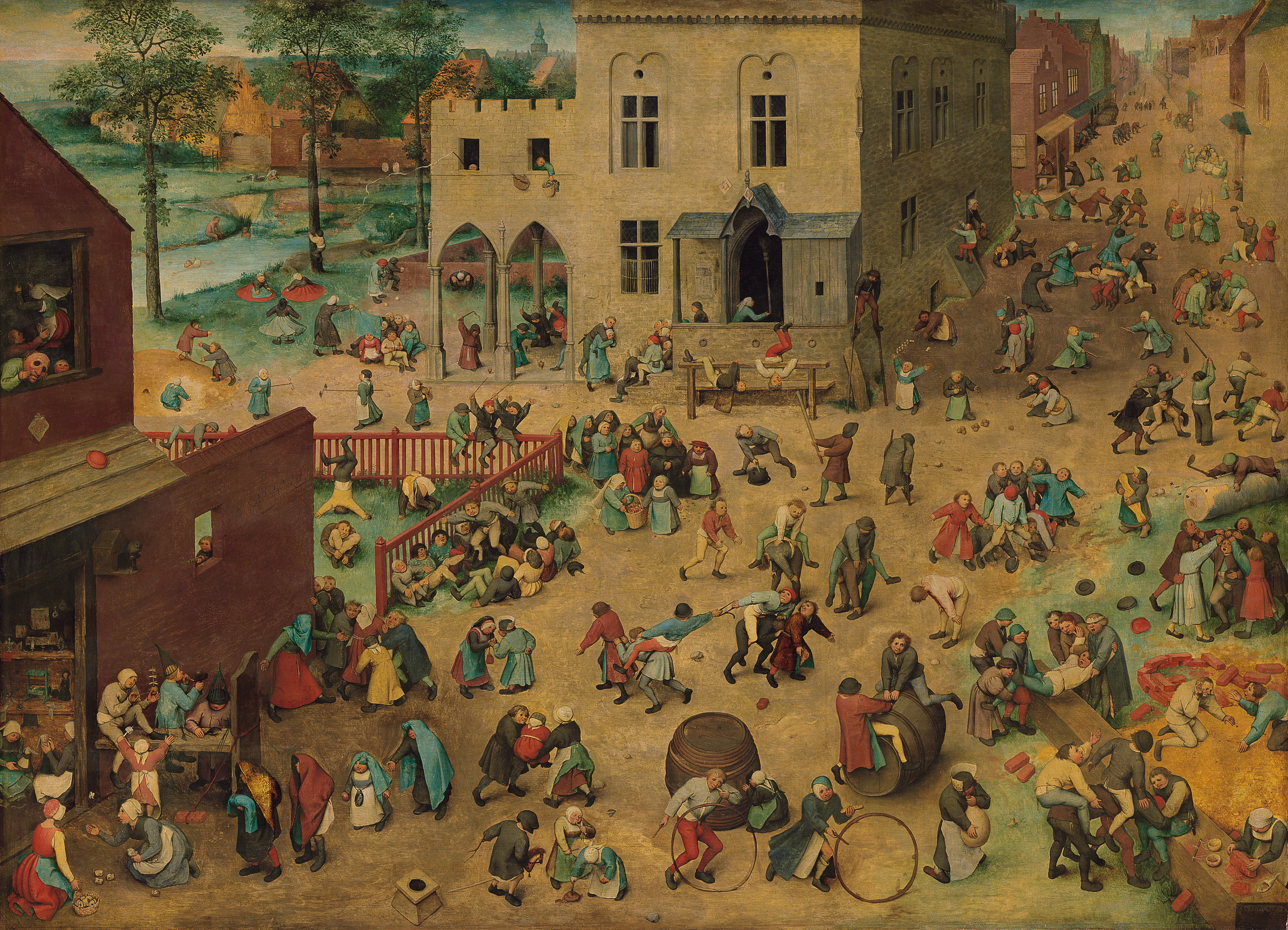
Children's Games, Bruegel, 1560

Its most famous conclusions are that "childhood" is a recent idea, and that parenting in the Middle Ages was largely detached. Ariès argues the following: nuclear family bonds of love and concern did not exist in the era, and children died too often to become emotionally attached. Children were not treated as delicate or protected from sexuality. They spent time with adults outside of family structures, and were not always segregated to school and family structures. Often they would be fostered to others as domestic servants.

Despite the book's fame for its thesis, Centuries of Childhood focuses more on the beginnings of systematized schooling and the decline of a common public sociability. This focus extends from the author's greater criticism of modern life and its schism of social elements he saw to be once united: "friendship, religion, [and] profession". In this way, Ariès did not believe modern families adequately replace the role of common public community.

== Criticism ==
There has been widespread criticism of the methods that Ariès used to draw his conclusions about the role of childhood in early modern Europe. One of his most noted critics was the historian Geoffrey Elton, whose main criticism of Ariès is paraphrased in Richard J. Evans's book on historiography, In Defence of History: "in everyday life children were indeed dressed differently to adults; they were just put in adult clothes to have their portraits painted."

That is to say that Ariès took early modern portraits as an accurate representation of the look of early modern families, but many clients would use them to improve their status.

The assertion that the medieval world was ignorant of childhood has undergone considerable attack from other writers.

Further criticism of Ariès is found in an article from 1992 by Harry Hendrick for the Journal of the Economic History Society. In the article, "Children and Childhood," Hendrick lists four criticisms of Ariès's work:

"Firstly that his data are either unrepresentative or unreliable. Secondly that he takes evidence out of context, confuses prescription with practice, and uses atypical examples. Thirdly, that he implicitly denies the immutability of the special needs of children, for food, clothing, shelter, affection and conversation. Fourthly, that he puts undue emphasis on the work of moralists and educationalists while saying little of economic and political factors."

== Legacy ==
"... in medieval society the idea of childhood did not exist."

— Philippe Ariès, Centuries of Childhood

Writing for The American Historical Review in 1998, Hugh Cunningham states that the book's influence "remains profound" after forty years, especially with respect to medieval childhood. He added that Ariès successfully persuaded his readers that the experience of childhood and its treatment as a stage of life had evolved across time and place. The book began the study of the history of childhood, which led to monographs on histories of individual aspects of childhood. A misleading translation of the French sentiment ("feeling") into "idea" became one of the translation's best-known lines ("In medieval society the idea of childhood did not exist") and led to a "mini-industry" of medieval scholars rebutting the false thesis.

"It cannot be over-emphasized that there is nothing to be said for Aries's view of childhood in the middle ages. ... Aries's views were mistaken: not simply in detail but in substance. It is time to lay them to rest."

— Nicholas Orme, Medieval Children

The popular view of the Ariès thesis was dismantled over the coming decades. Slate's Stephen Metcalf describes an "anti-Arièsist" cottage industry whose most notable practitioners include historians Steven Ozment and Nicholas Orme. Orme wrote Medieval Children, a book dedicated to refuting the Ariès thesis, which reviewers agree it did. Orme concluded that "medieval children were ourselves, five hundred or a thousand years ago" and that their parents genuinely cherished and grieved for their children, similar to modern parents. Despite these decades of refutation, the Ariès thesis persists in non-academics, who associate medieval children with "miniature adults".

The book had considerable academic influence and began a trend in the humanities where studied ideas are seen as caused by culture rather than by nature, biology, or self. Metcalf described Centuries of Childhood as a book "that, virtually on contact, sets the mind on fire" for its imagination, especially as written in 1960, a time of childhood's expansion. Metcalf asserted that Ariès' method of cultural causes influenced Michel Foucault's thinking, which has since touched most academic disciplines.

== Sources ==
- Cunningham, Hugh (1998). "Histories of Childhood". The American Historical Review. 103 (4). Oxford University Press on behalf of the American Historical Association: 1195–1208. doi:10.2307/2651207. ISSN 0002-8762. JSTOR 2651207.
