= Nicholas Orme =

British historian

Professor Nicholas Orme FSA FRHistS
- Born: 1942 (age 83–84)
- Occupations: Historian and academic
- Title: Professor of History

Academic background
- Education: Magdalen College, Oxford

Academic work
- Discipline: History
- Sub-discipline: Middle Ages; Early modern Britain; History of childhood; History of education; Social history; History of religions; English Reformation
- Institutions: University of Exeter

Nicholas Orme (2015)

Nicholas Orme FSA FRHistS (born 1942) is a British historian specialising in the Middle Ages and Tudor period, focusing on the history of children, and ecclesiastical history, with a particular interest in South West England.

Orme is an emeritus Professor of History at Exeter University. He studied at Magdalen College, Oxford, and has worked as a visiting scholar at, among others, Merton College, Oxford, St John's College, Oxford, and the University of Arizona. He retired on 31 May 2007 and is a canon of the Church of England.

His 2021 book, Going to Church in Medieval England, was shortlisted for the 2022 Wolfson History Prize.

Orme was elected a Fellow of the Royal Historical Society in 1973 and of the Society of Antiquaries of London in 1982.

In addition to his scholarly works, Orme has published Ten Cathedral Ghosts (2022), a volume of historically themed ghost stories in the tradition of M. R. James and A. N. L. Munby.

== Selected works ==
- (1973) English Schools in the Middle Ages, Routledge, ISBN 0-416-16080-8
- (1976) Education in the West of England, 1066–1548, University of Exeter Press, ISBN 0-85989-041-4
- (1980) The Minor Clergy of Exeter Cathedral: 1300–1548 – a list of the minor officers, vicars choral, annuellars, secondaries and choristers. University of Exeter Press ISBN 0-85989-175-5
- (1983) Early British Swimming, 55 B.C.–1719 A.D: with the first swimming treatise in English, 1595. University of Exeter Press ISBN 0-85989-134-8
- (1984) From Childhood to Chivalry: Education of the English Kings and Aristocracy, Routledge, ISBN 0-416-74830-9
- (1987) Exeter Cathedral as It Was, 1050–1550, Devon Books ISBN 0-86114-785-5
- (1988) Education in Early Tudor England: Magdalen College Oxford and Its School, 1480–1540, Magdalen College
- (1989) Education and Society in Mediaeval and Renaissance England, Hambledon Continuum, ISBN 1-85285-003-5
- (1989) Table Manners for Children, by John Lydgate; with translation and introduction by Nicholas Orme ISBN 0-907596-17-7
- (1991) Unity and Variety: a History of the Church in Devon and Cornwall ISBN 0-85989-355-3
- (1996) English Church Dedications: With a Survey of Cornwall and Devon, University of Exeter Press ISBN 0-85989-516-5
- (2000) The Saints of Cornwall, Oxford University Press, ISBN 0-19-820765-4
- (2001) Medieval Children, New Haven: Yale University Press ISBN 0-300-08541-9
- (2006) Medieval Schools: From Roman Britain to Tudor England, New Haven: Yale University Press, ISBN 0-300-11102-9
- (2006) School founders and patrons in England, 597–1560
- (2007) Cornish Wills, 1342–1540. Devon and Cornwall Record Society, ISBN 9780901853509
- (2007) Cornwall and the Cross. Chichester: Phillimore
- (2007) The Victoria History of the County of Cornwall: Religious History to 1559 v. 2, ISBN 1-904356-12-5
- (2009) Exeter Cathedral: The First Thousand Years, c. 400–1550, Impress Books, ISBN 978-0-9556239-8-1.
- (2014) The Churches of Medieval Exeter, Impress Books, ISBN 9781907605512.
- (2021) Going to Church in Medieval England, Yale University Press, ISBN 978-0300256505
- (2023) Tudor Children, Yale University Press, ISBN 978-0300267969

=== Works as editor or collaborator ===
- Nicholas Roscarrock's Lives of the Saints (1992); ISBN 0-901853-35-6
- With Margaret Webster: (1995) The English Hospital, 1070–1570, Yale University Press; ISBN 0-300-06058-0
- With David Lepine: (2003) Death and Memory in Medieval Exeter, Devon & Cornwall Record Society; ISBN 0-901853-46-1

For a more extensive list of Orme's publications, see School of Humanities and Social Sciences of the University of Exeter Website and the University Library Catalogue.
