= History of early childhood care and education =

The History of early childhood care and education (ECCE) refers to the development of care and education of children between birth and eight years old throughout history. ECCE has a global scope, and caring for and educating young children has always been an integral part of human societies. Arrangements for fulfilling these societal roles have evolved over time and remain varied across cultures, often reflecting family and community structures as well as the social and economic roles of women and men. Historically, such arrangements have largely been informal, involving family, household and community members. The formalization of these arrangements emerged in the nineteenth century with the establishment of kindergartens for educational purposes and day nurseries for care in much of Europe and North America, Brazil, China, India, Jamaica and Mexico.

State-led expansion of ECCE services first emerged in the Russian Federation in the early twentieth century as part of the socialist project to foster equal participation of women and men in production and in public life, and to publicly provide education from the youngest possible age. This development extended to socialist or former socialist countries such as Cambodia, China and Viet Nam. France was another early starter having integrated pre-school into its education system as early as 1886 and expanded its provision in the 1950s. In real terms, the significant expansion of ECCE services began in the 1960s with the considerable growth in women's participation in the Labour Market and extensive developments in child and family policies in Europe and the US.

== ECCE development in 1990s ==
The 1990s opened a new page in the history of the development of ECCE catalysed mainly by the rapid and successive ratification of the 1989 United Nations Convention on the Rights of the Child (CRC). By its explicit mention of 'the child' – meaning every human being under the age of 18 or majority – the CRC reinforced the 1960 UNESCO Convention and Recommendation against Discrimination in Education which should have covered young children in any case. With its moral force and near universal ratification, the CRC formally recognized children as holders of rights to survival and development, to be heard and to participate in decisions affecting them in accordance with their evolving capacities with their best interests and non-discrimination as overarching principles. While the CRC in Article 18 also recognizes the primary role of parents and legal guardians in the upbringing and development of children, it obliges States Parties to help them carry out these duties.

The second boost to the development of ECCE was the adoption of the World Declaration on Education For All (EFA) in March 1990 in Jomtien, Thailand. Reflecting General Comment 7, the Jomtien Declaration explicitly stated that 'learning begins at birth', and called for 'early childhood care and initial education' (Article 5). This novel recognition of ECCE as an integral part of basic education featured again in the major goals adopted at the 1990 UN World Summit for Children. Ten years later, in 2000, this expanded vision of basic education was rearmed in the Dakar Framework for Action on EFA, adopted at the World Education Forum as the first of the six EFA goals: 'Expanding and improving comprehensive ECCE especially for the most vulnerable and disadvantaged children'. Regrettably, unlike other EFA goals, this was stated as a broad and aspirational goal without numerical targets or clear benchmarks.

== ECCE development in the 21st century ==
ECCE was further reinforced by the Millennium Development Goals (MDGs), albeit only partially. Adopted at the UN Millennium Summit in 2000, two of the MDGs had direct relevance to early childhood development: (i) improving maternal health, with the targets of reducing the maternal mortality rates by three-quarters and providing universal access to reproductive health (MDG4), and (ii) reducing the under-five mortality rate by two-thirds between 1990 and 2015 (MDG5). Thus, the child and maternal health aspects of ECCE became part and parcel of a global 'effort to meet the needs of the world's poorest' while childcare and early education aspects were left out.

In recent decades, ECCE has further received attention from diverse stakeholders including research communities, civil society and intergovernmental organizations which furthered understanding of its holistic and multisectoral nature. Research continues to document the multifaceted development benefits of ECCE for health, education, social and emotional well-being, social equity and cohesion, the economy, employment and earnings.

== See also ==
- History of education
- History of childhood
- Right to education
- Social history#History of education

== Sources ==
This article incorporates text from a free content work. Licensed under CC-BY-SA IGO 3.0 (license statement/permission). Text taken from Investing against Evidence: The Global State of Early Childhood Care and Education, 9-11, Marope, P.T.M., Kaga, Y., UNESCO. UNESCO.
