= Philippe Ariès =

French medievalist and historian (1914–1984)

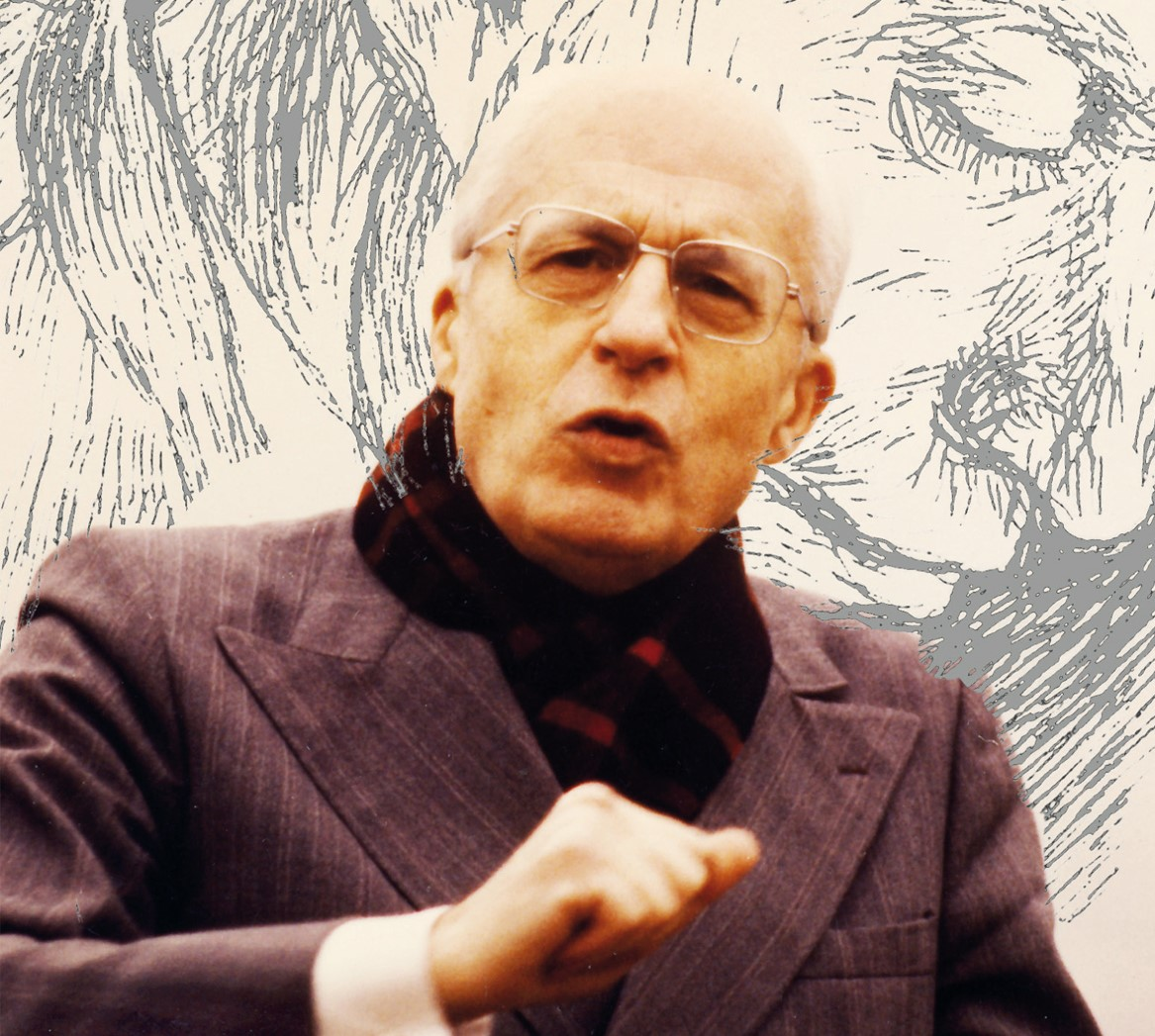
- Born: 21 July 1914; Blois, French Third Republic
- Died: 8 February 1984 (aged 69); Toulouse, France
- Occupation: Historian
- Known for: Centuries of Childhood

Philippe Ariès (French: [filip aʁjɛs]; 21 July 1914 – 8 February 1984) was a French medievalist and historian of the family and childhood, in the style of Georges Duby. He wrote many books on common daily life. His most prominent works concerned the change in western attitudes towards death.

== Work ==
Ariès was a pioneer in the field of cultural history, the "history of mentalities" as it was called, which flourished from the 1960s to the 1980s and dealt with the themes and concerns of ordinary people going about their lives. He focused on the changing nature of childhood from the 15th to the 18th century in his Centuries of Childhood. Overall, his contribution was about placing family life in the context of a larger historical narrative, and the evolution of a distinction between public and private life in the modern era.

During his life his work was often better known in the English-speaking world than it was in France itself. He is best known for his book L’Enfant et la Vie Familiale sous l’Ancien Régime (1960), which was translated into English as Centuries of Childhood (1962). This book is pre-eminent in the history of childhood, as it was essentially the first book on the subject (although some antiquarian texts were earlier). Even today, Ariès remains the standard reference to the topic. Ariès is most famous for his statement that "in Medieval society, the idea of childhood did not exist". Its central thesis is that attitudes towards children were progressive and evolved over time with economic change and social advancement, until childhood, as a concept and an accepted part of family life, from the 17th century. Ariès claimed that before the modern age childhood was seen as an unimportant phase in life, and that due to high infant and childhood mortality, parents did not let themselves become attached to their children, who were seen as a "probable loss." As soon as children could function without their mother (around seven years old, according to Ariès), they entered the adult world, but this would later change as the importance of education was recognized and more children began attending school.

The book has had mixed fortunes. His contribution was profoundly significant both in that it recognised childhood as a social construction rather than as a biological given and in that it showed that the history of childhood was a serious field of study. At the same time, his account of childhood has been criticised by those who reject his claim that the concept of childhood did not exist in the Middle Ages. He has also been accused of presentism.

Ariès is also remembered for his invention of another field of study: the history of attitudes to death and dying. Ariès saw death, like childhood, as a social construction. His seminal work on this subject is L'Homme devant la mort (1977).

== Personal life ==
Ariès regarded himself as an "anarchist of the right". He was initially close to the Action française but later distanced himself from it, as he viewed it as too authoritarian, hence his self-description as an "anarchist". Ariès also contributed to La Nation française, a royalist review. However, he also co-operated with many left-wing French historians, especially with Michel Foucault, who wrote his obituary.

== Works ==
- 1943. Les Traditions sociales dans les pays de France, Éditions de la Nouvelle France.
- 1948. Histoire des populations françaises et de leurs attitudes devant la vie depuis le XVIII^{e}, Self.
- 1949. Attitudes devant la vie et devant la mort du XVII^{e} au XIX^{e}, quelques aspects de leurs variations, INED.
- 1953. Sur les origines de la contraception en France, from Population 3 (July–September): pp. 465–72.
- 1954. Le Temps de l'histoire, Éditions du Rocher.
- 1954. Deux contributions à l'histoire des pratiques contraceptives, from Population 4 (October–December): pp. 683–98.
- 1960. L'Enfant et la vie familiale sous l'Ancien Régime, Plon. English translation: Centuries of Childhood. A Social History of Family Life. Robert Baldick (translation). Alfred A. Knopf. 1962. OCLC 265109.
- 1975. Essais sur l'histoire de la mort en Occident: du Moyen Âge à nos jours, Seuil. English translation: Western Attitudes Toward Death from the Middle Ages to the Present. Patricia M. Ranum (translation). Johns Hopkins University Press. 1974. ISBN 0-8018-1566-5. OCLC 805001.
- 1977. L'Homme devant la mort, Seuil. English translation: The Hour of Our Death. Helen Weaver (translation). Knopf. 1981. ISBN 0-394-41074-2. OCLC 6278130.
- 1980. Un historien du dimanche (with Michel Winock), Seuil.
- 1983. Images de l'homme devant la mort, Seuil. English translation: Images of Man and Death. Janet Lloyd (translation). Harvard University Press. 1985.
- 1985–1987. Histoire de la vie privée, (with Georges Duby), 5 volumes: I. De l'Empire romain à l'an mil; II. De l'Europe féodale à la Renaissance; III. De la Renaissance aux Lumières; IV. De la Révolution à la Grande guerre; V. De la Première Guerre mondiale à nos jours, Seuil.
- 1993. Essais de mémoire: 1943–1983, Seuil.
- 1997. Le présent quotidien, 1955–1966, Seuil. Collection of articles published in La Nation française between 1955 and 1966.
- 2001. Histoire de la vie privée, (with Georges Duby), le Grand livre du mois.
