= List of non-fiction books about alcohol abuse =

This is a chronological list of notable non-fiction books written about alcohol abuse.

== Memoirs ==
- Asylum (1935)
- I'll Cry Tomorrow (1954)
- A Fan's Notes (1968)
- Betty: A Glad Awakening (1987)
- Angela's Ashes (1996)
- Wasted: Tales of a GenX Drunk (1997)
- Dry (2003)
- The Glass Castle (2005)
- God and Man at Georgetown Prep (2005)
- Smashed: Story of a Drunken Girlhood (2005)
- Wishful Drinking (2008)
- Leave the Light On (2010)
- Dog Flowers (2021)
- Hillbilly Elegy (2016)

== Others ==
- Alcoholics Anonymous: The Story of How More Than One Hundred Men and Women Have Recovered from Alcoholism (The Big Book) (1935)
- The Little Red Book (1946)
- Twelve Steps and Twelve Traditions (1953)
- The Cup of Fury (1956)
- Day by Day (1974)

== See also ==
- List of books about sobriety
- Novels about alcoholism
