= List of books about sobriety =

This bibliography of sobriety books is a list of written and published works about the virtues of abstinence, the titles listed here are limited to self-help and memoir books about recovery from alcohol (known as quit lit) and drug addiction, published by notable authors and publishers.

== Books about sobriety ==
Title	Year	Publisher	ISBN	Author (s)
Quit Like a Woman: The Radical Choice to Not Drink in a Culture Obsessed with Alcohol	2020	Bloomsbury Publishing	ISBN 978-1526612250	Holly Glenn Whitaker
This Naked Mind: The myth-busting cult hit for anyone who wants to cut down their alcohol consumption	2018	HQ	ISBN 978-0008293437	Annie Grace
The Unexpected Joy of Being Sober: Discovering a happy, healthy, wealthy alcohol-free life	2017	Aster	ISBN 978-1912023387	Catherine Gray
The Sober Diaries: How one woman stopped drinking and started living	2018	Coronet	ISBN 978-1473661905	Clare Pooley
Sober Curious: The Blissful Sleep, Greater Focus, Limitless Presence, and Deep Connection Awaiting Us All on the Other Side of Alcohol	2019	HarperOne	ISBN 978-0062869043	Ruby Warrington
We Are the Luckiest: The Surprising Magic of a Sober Life	2020	New World Library	ISBN 978-1608687862	Laura McKowen
The 28 Day Alcohol-Free Challenge: Sleep Better, Lose Weight, Boost Energy, Beat Anxiety	2017	Bluebird	ISBN 978-1509857258	Andy Ramage, Ruari Fairbairns
Drink?: The New Science of Alcohol and Your Health	2020	Yellow Kite	ISBN 978-1529398014	Professor David Nutt
The Wine O'Clock Myth: The Truth About Women and Alcohol	2006	Allen & Unwin	ISBN 978-1988547220	Lotta Dann
Quit Drinking: Understanding alcoholism, removing the addiction from your life and believing in your future sober self	2021	Wrtying Ltd	ISBN 978-1913871536	Rebecca Dolton
Sober: Football. My Story. My Life	2018	Simon & Schuster UK	ISBN 978-1471156755	Tony Adams
Recovery: Freedom From Our Addictions	2018	Bluebird	ISBN 978-1509850860	Russell Brand
How to Quit Alcohol in 50 Days: Stop Drinking and Find Freedom	2020	Sheldon Press	ISBN 978-1529357585	Simon Chapple
Easy Way to Control Alcohol	2009	Arcturus	ISBN 978-0470190845	Allen Carr
The Sober Girl Society Handbook: An empowering guide to living hangover free	2021	Corgi	ISBN 978-0552178655	Millie Gooch
Girl Walks Out of a Bar: A Memoir	2016	SelectBooks	ISBN 978-1590793213	Lisa Smith
Alcoholics Anonymous - Big Book	2002	Hazelden Distributed Titles	ISBN 978-1893007161	Alcoholics Anonymous World Services
Kick the Drink. . .Easily!	2011	Crown House Publishing	ISBN 978-1845903909	Jason Vale
The dry challenge : how to lose the booze for dry January, sober October, and any other alcohol-free month	2020	Harper Design	ISBN 978-0062937704	Hilary Sheinbaum
Understanding the alcoholic's mind : the nature of craving and how to control it	1989	Oxford University Press	ISBN 978-0195059182	Arnold M Ludwig
Seven weeks to sobriety : the proven program to fight alcoholism through nutrition	1997	Ballantine Books	ISBN 9780449002599	Joan Matthews-Larson
Addiction recovery tools : a practitioner's handbook	2001	SAGE	ISBN 9780761920663	Robert H Coombs
Tomorrow I'll be different : the effective way to stop drinking	1993	Overlook Press	ISBN 9780879516291	Beauchamp Colclough

== See also ==
- List of non-fiction books about alcohol abuse
- Sobriety
