= Alcohol education =

Instruction on alcohol consumption effects

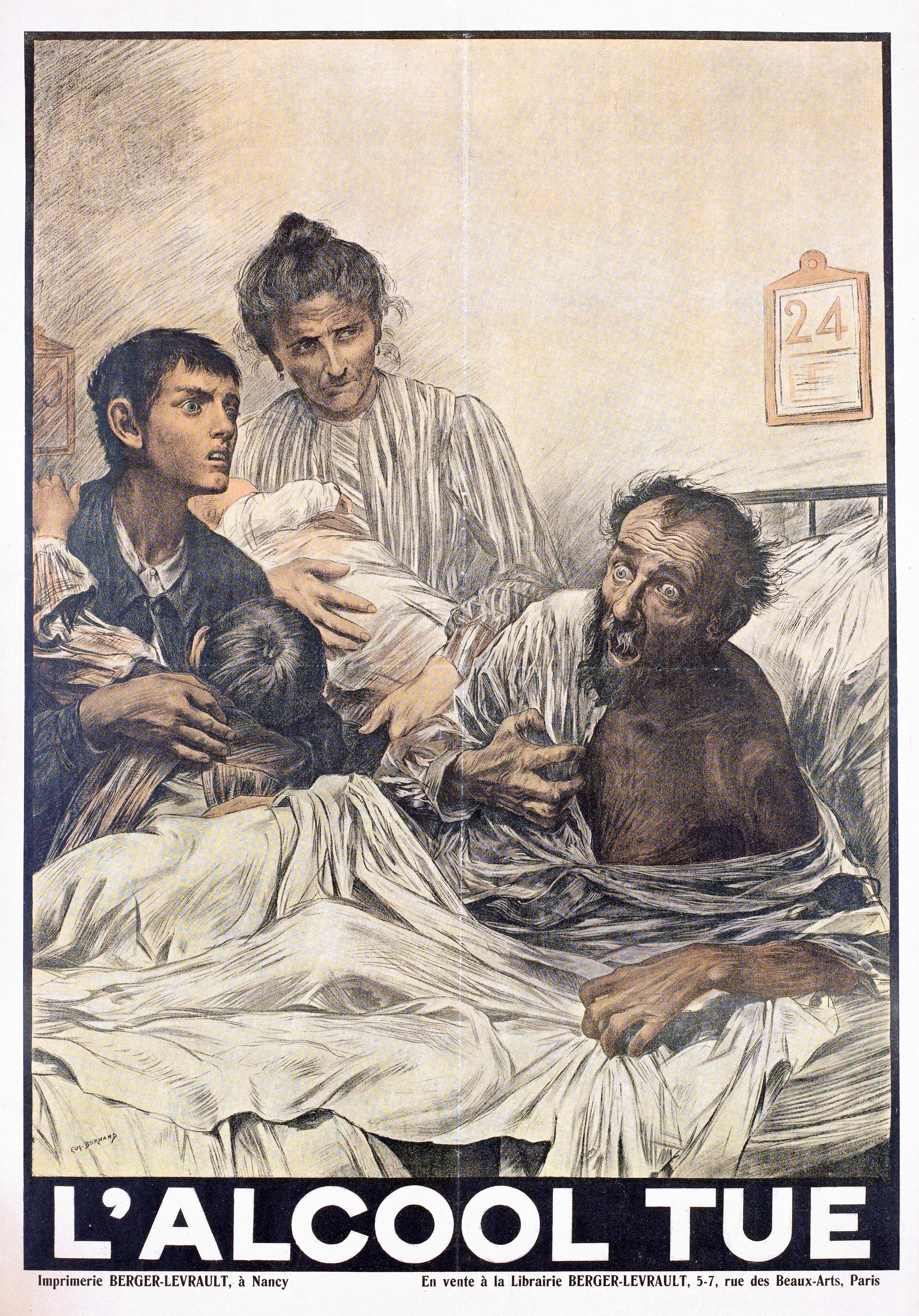
French poster warning that "l'alcool tue" ("alcohol kills")

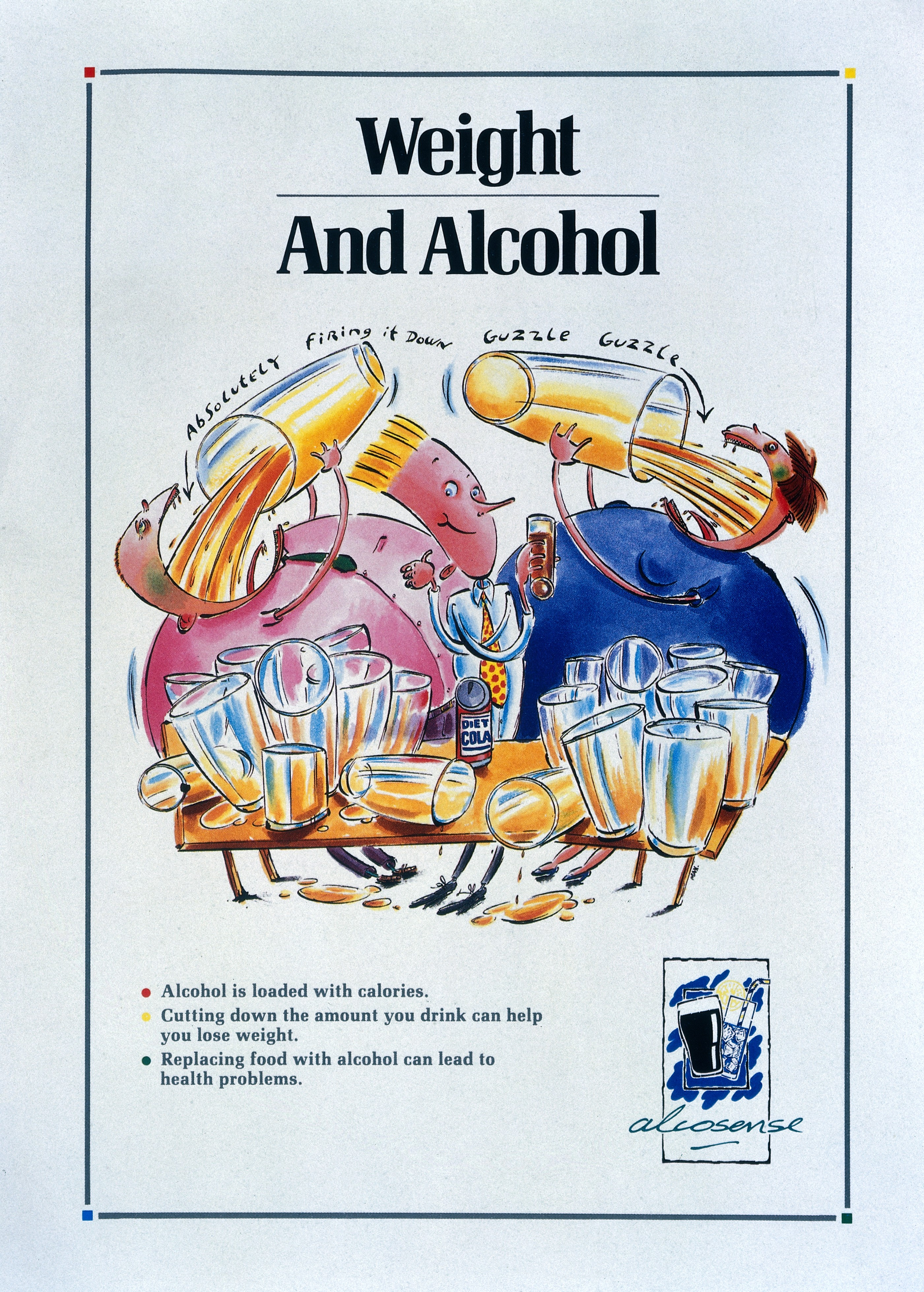
British poster about the weight gaining effects of alcohol

Alcohol education is the practice of disseminating information about the effects of alcohol on health, as well as society and the family unit. It was introduced into the public schools by temperance organizations such as the Woman's Christian Temperance Union in the late 19th century. Initially, alcohol education focused on how the consumption of alcoholic beverages affected society, as well as the family unit. In the 1930s, this came to also incorporate education pertaining to alcohol's effects on health. For example, even light and moderate alcohol consumption increases cancer risk in individuals. Organizations such as the National Institute on Alcohol Abuse and Alcoholism in the United States were founded to promulgate alcohol education alongside those of the temperance movement, such as the American Council on Alcohol Problems.

== Definition ==
Alcohol education is the planned provision of information and skills relevant to living in a world where alcohol is commonly misused. The World Health Organisations (WHO) Global Status Report on Alcohol and Health, highlights the fact that alcohol will be a larger problem in later years, with estimates suggesting it will be the leading cause of disability and death. Informing people on alcohol and harmful drinking should become a priority.

== Effects of alcohol on the brain ==
Alcohol has been known to have grave effects on the human brain. It has been shown that heavy drinking may have extensive and far-reaching effects on the brain such as simple "slips" in memory to permanent and debilitating conditions. Moderate drinking can even lead to the same types of impairments related with heavy drinking. Effects of long-term and short-term alcohol intake may include difficulty walking, blurred vision, slurred speech, slowed reaction times, impaired memory, etc. A lot of factors influence how alcohol affects a certain individual. Factors such as:

- how much and how often a person drinks
- the age at which an individual first began drinking, and how long they have been drinking
- an individual's age, level of education, gender, genetic background, and family history of alcoholism
- whether the individual is at risk as a result of prenatal and peer pressure
- an individual's personal health issues

Educating an individual about the effects of alcohol before they reach drinking age could be a useful eye-opener, especially with the developing brain of students.

== Goals ==
Educating youth and adults about alcohol use is an attempt to minimize the risk of developing a substance use disorder in the future. Drinking alcoholic beverages is among the major causes of health problems world-wide. Substance use at a young age can lead to a variety of health risks, both immediate and later in life, as well as an increased probability of developing a SUD. Educating the youth about the effects of alcohol and health problems that come with it earlier on in life may help prevent the damage before it is done.

== Education approaches ==
=== The Abstinence Model ===
The abstinence model is commonly known as "don't do it". This model represents alcohol as bad or sinful because of moral, religious, health or other reasons. Although there are people who abstain from alcohol because of these reasons, not everyone falls under these categories. Therefore, the abstinence model has not proven to be successful in multi-cultural societies where not everyone has the same reason to abstain from alcohol.

=== The Social-Economic Model ===
The social-economic model represents statistics and facts related to the excessive use of alcohol. Irresponsible drinking can lead to a variety of problems and this model informs people about the outcomes of fatal car accidents, crimes committed and family issues all arising from the misuse of alcohol. This model also portrays the amount of money spent on health problems also related to alcohol. However this model is one-sided and has shown to be ineffective.

=== The Alcoholism Approach ===
The alcoholism approach treats alcohol as if it were a disease. The alcoholism approach compares the negative effects of alcohol to the negative effect of other diseases. It focuses on the negative physiological and psychological effect of the drug. Although this approach may be helpful to point out signs and symptoms of alcohol use disorder it fails to discourage a person from drinking, responsibly or irresponsibly.

=== The Alternative Approach ===
The alternative approach seeks to find alternatives to drinking. The alternatives have shown to be successful in the replacement of alcohol as long as they are available to the person alternating. This approach though does not do well to change one's drinking attitude or habit, but rather lessens the amount of alcohol consumed. It is also hard to find alternatives to fit in the place of alcohol in some cases where alcohol is intertwined with many sporting events.

== Cost and benefit ==
People often wonder if alcohol education programs are worth the money. According to the article "What We Can—and Cannot—Expect from School-Based Drug Prevention," out of The Journal of Drug and Alcohol Review, an average substance use disorder program costing $150 can save $840 in social costs per participant. Granted this study focused on more than just alcohol, but at 28 percent alcohol was responsible for the second highest amount of social savings. Social savings can be seen in the form of healthcare expenditures, incarcerations, impaired productivity, premature death, and so on. The authors of this article also claim that a reduction in premature childbirth and other drug usage, along with better school performance and higher graduation rates are extra benefits of using a substance use disorder program.

== Books ==
Many books on alcohol abuse and alcohol abuse cessation exist, the genre is known as Quit lit.

== National programs ==
=== United States ===
Amid the medical world's reappraisal of alcohol’s health effects, the proportion of Americans who believe even moderate alcohol consumption—one or two drinks per day—is bad for one’s health has doubled. Concurrently, the number of people who report drinking alcohol has declined.

Teaching about alcohol consumption has been a controversial topic for schools in the United States due to the differing viewpoints of Americans on the subject. A variety of educational methods - as mentioned above - that reflect these viewpoints have been developed and tried over the last century, but have yielded little behavioral change.

==== School system ====
Alcohol education standards in K–12 public schools vary from state to state. In rare cases, some states such as Alaska do not require a statewide alcohol education program in their public schools. In other states, such as Delaware, the requirements are much more stringent. Delaware's students must complete 10 hours of training per year relating to drugs including alcohol in grades K-4 and 15 hours in grades 5–12.

Many studies such as Project SAFE have shown that targeting people as young as 6–8 is crucial in order to prevent them from abusing alcohol later on in life. People who begin drinking before the age of 15 are five times more likely to develop an alcohol use disorder later in life. Substance Abuse and Mental Health Services Administration (SAMSHA) claims that "Approximately 10 percent of 12-year-olds say they have used alcohol at least once. By age 13 that number doubles."

In past alcohol education programs in American schools, scare tactics were used in an attempt to persuade adolescents not to drink. According to a non-profit organization known as Prevention First, the use of scare tactics in alcohol awareness programs can actually be counterproductive. This is due to the fact that students learn better from someone who is honest and does not present them with fallacies.

==== College ====
Alcohol programs and courses as a requirement of college students is a current, widespread movement to educate underage students about alcohol consumption in efforts to make binge drinking decrease, and safer students.

Currently 747 schools in the United States require some sort of alcohol education. Students must complete a program which educates them on the consequences of binge drinking. MADD states in a recent publication that 4 out of 5 college students drink and 100% of students surveyed said that drinking alcohol while in college has social benefits. Most colleges have alcohol policies which restrict underage drinking and have consequences. Many schools also require an entrance program to be attended by all transfer students as well as freshman that make the dangers and the policies regarding alcohol clear. A documentary about the late 18-year-old Gordie Bailey is shown at many colleges.

Online courses are used in many schools. A course commonly used by institutions is AlcoholEdu, a population-level prevention program typically administered to all high school or college freshmen. AlcoholEdu's purpose is to change or influence how college students feel about drinking, as well as educate students on the harmful and negative risks associated with heavy consumption of alcohol by presenting students with realistic case studies to influence students not to over consume.

In the United States, Collegedrinkingprevention.gov is a government funded website based through the National Institute on Alcohol Abuse and Alcoholism which aims to change the drinking culture of college. Their report, A Call to Action: Changing the Culture of Drinking at U.S. Colleges, details how colleges and universities conduct alcohol programs. Publicly funded universities must comply with their standards as stated in their report.

=== Australia ===
In Australia teenage alcohol use is a growing problem; in 2011 74% of Australian students aged between 12 and 17 had tried alcohol in the past year, and in 2010 a study showed that 31% of 16- to 17-year-old students had consumed more than 20 standard drinks in one session. Every year, 5,500 people in Australia die, and around 157,000 are hospitalised from directly drinking alcohol. 400 more lives are lost from alcohol-related assaults. It is costing the country around $36 billion annually. The Australian Government has set up various organisations and campaigns to try to tackle the rise in teenage drinking, reduce the number of deaths and injuries that occur, as well as inform people of the adverse effects that can result from binge drinking.

==== Government organizations ====
DrinkWise Australia is the most prominent organization in Australia aimed at educating the public on alcohol use, mainly focused on teenagers. Their campaign urging school leavers to drink responsibly (titled "How to Drink Properly") is believed to have been successful. One in three 18- to 24-year-olds who saw the campaign said they reduced their drinking on a night out, and just over half of young adults said the campaign helped them discuss their drinking habits. The campaign won a Silver Spike award at the 2014 Spike Asia awards.

Current methods in schools for educating about alcohol include:

- Using an approach relating to social influence
- Involve parental participation and work on building connections in the community
- Focus on interacting highly with students for a hands on delivery

There are four main types of alcohol education programs used in Australia:

- School-based (classroom or whole school)
- Family-based
- Community-based
- Combination (of school- and community-based programs)

==== School-based programs ====
Australian States each have different programs set up by their state governments aimed at high school students as well as multiple studies to research the effect that school-based education had on drinking habits.

Western Australia's Commissioner for Children and Young People (CCYP) sought out how teenagers aged 14–17 view alcohol and the negative consequences that could result from consuming it as well as knowledge about standard drinks and the national alcoholic guidelines in 2011. The CCYP also promoted two programs – SDERA (School Drug Education and Road Awareness) and SHAHRP (School Health and Alcohol Harm Reduction Project) – to educate the high school students about prevention and reduction of alcohol induced harm. SDERA targeted prevention and was taught as part of the health and physical education curriculum in WA, whereas SHAHRP targeted the reducing possible harm and was conducted by the National Drug Research Institute at Curtin University.

Victorian Department of Education and Training implemented the 'Get Ready' program in 2012. The program was aimed at students in years 7–9 and taught students about risks of alcohol and other drugs.

Similarly, Queensland's Department of Education, Training and Employment worked with their Curriculum and Assessment Authority to create their education program 'Alcohol and other drugs education program.' The program addresses alcohol and other drugs through the health and physical education curriculum and is aimed at high school student in years 7-12. The program works alongside the 'safe night out strategy' which is about violence caused by alcohol and other drugs.

== See also ==
- Drug education
