= Santa Barbara Bowl =

Music venue in Santa Barbara, California, USA

- The Bowl
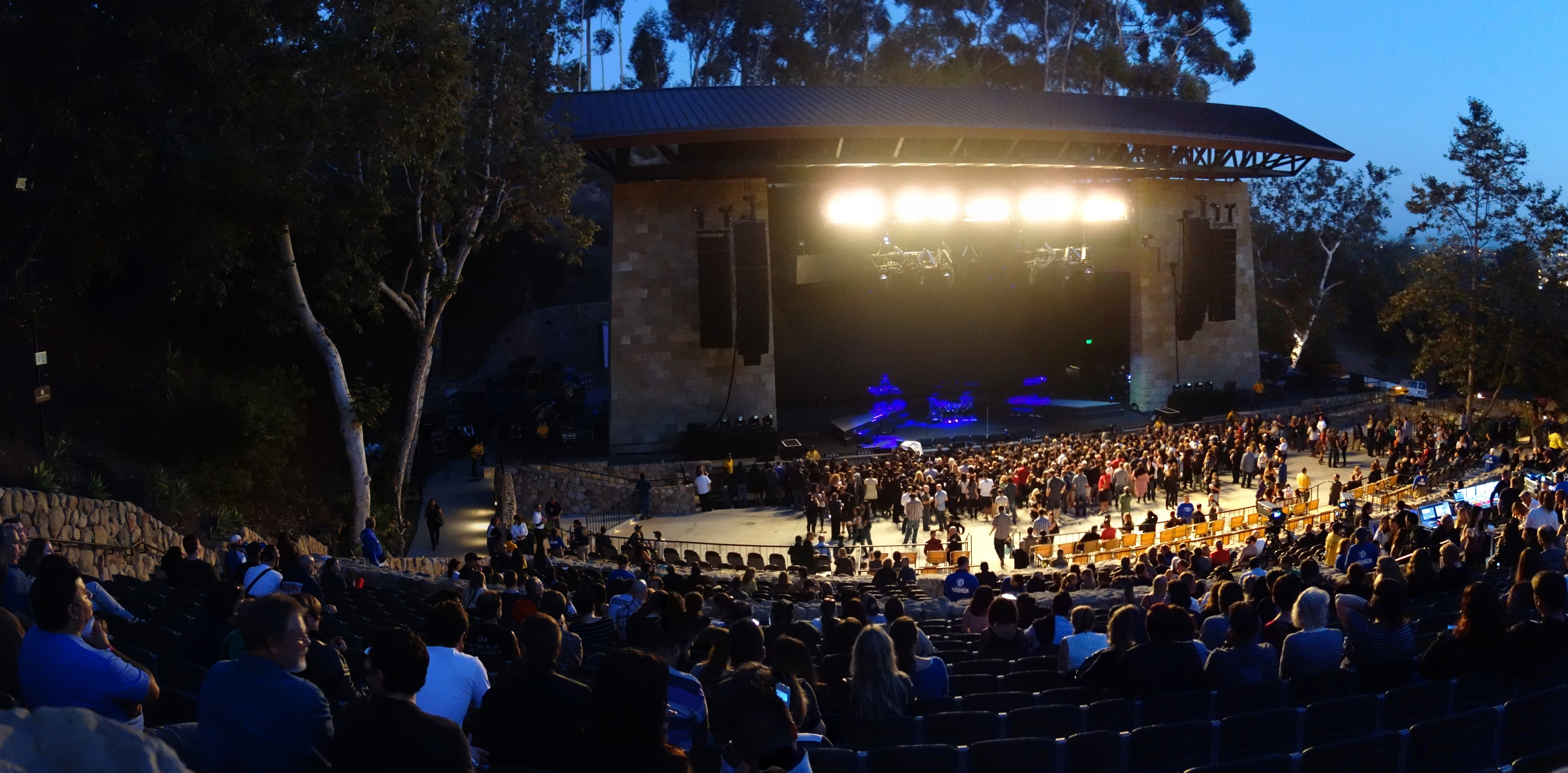
- The venue before a concert in 2013.
- Interactive map of Santa Barbara Bowl
- Location: Santa Barbara, California
- Owner: Santa Barbara Bowl Foundation
- Seating type: Seats
- Capacity: 4,562
- Type: Outdoor amphitheater

Construction
- Built: 1936
- Renovated: 1994–2012

Website
- Santa Barbara Bowl

The Santa Barbara Bowl is a 4,562-seat amphitheater, located in Santa Barbara, California. The amphitheater is open for concerts from approximately April through approximately October with an average of about 27 concerts per season. Booked exclusively by Goldenvoice in Los Angeles, the Bowl hosts primarily popular music concerts. Since 1991, the Santa Barbara Bowl has been managed by the not-for-profit Santa Barbara Bowl Foundation.

== History ==
In the 1920s, La Primavera pageant used the location of what is now Peabody Stadium.

In 1924, fiesta week, 'Old Spanish Days,' began.

In 1935, Santa Barbara Bowl was carved into the hillside, a dry creek bed, as a WPA project. It was originally built to serve as a venue for the annual pageant of Old Spanish Days — Fiesta.

The amphitheater's original stage was a revolving wooden stage, but this was washed out during El Niño rains in 1939. The stage was replaced with a concrete slab that remained in place until renovation work in 2001.

In the 1970s, Sepp Donahower, of Pinnacle Dance Concerts promoted pop music concerts, (Little Feat, Loggins and Messina, Average White Band, The Beach Boys, and others).

== Prominent concerts ==
Joni Mitchell's 1980 double live album and concert film, Shadows and Light, was recorded at the venue in September 1979 on her tour in-support of the Mingus album. Her all-star backing band was made up of prominent jazz fusion musicians Pat Metheny, Lyle Mays, Jaco Pastorius, Don Alias, and Michael Brecker.

On November 25, 1979, during his Survival tour, Bob Marley and The Wailers performed at the Bowl.

British-American band The Pretenders performed a concert at the Santa Barbara Bowl on August 30, 1981. Film of both the rehearsal at the venue of their song Day After Day and it's subsequent performance are featured in the video for the song.

British band Tears For Fears performed at the amphitheatre in May 1990, which was filmed for their Going To California concert video.

During Pearl Jam's benefit for the Louis Warschaw Prostate Cancer Center on October 28, 2003, Chris Cornell joined the band on-stage, effectively reuniting Temple of the Dog for the first time since 1992. Their performance of "Reach Down" as well as their cover of “I Believe in Miracles” by the Ramones from that night later appeared on Pearl Jam's 2003 Ten Club Christmas single.

Maroon 5’s performance, on May 13th 2005, was recorded for their Live - Friday the 13th live album and DVD.

On Wednesday, October 20, 2010, Colombian musician Shakira performed a show at the Bowl during her Sun Comes Out World Tour.

On Saturday, May 19, 2018, pop star and Santa Barbara native Katy Perry performed a benefit concert at the Bowl as a part of WITNESS: The Tour, calling the show WITNESS: Coming Home. The concert was organized after the local Montecito fire evacuations and mudslide disasters.

Olivia Rodrigo performed a sold-out show at the amphitheater on May 21, 2022 as part of her Sour Tour.

Freya Skye performed a sold-out show at the amphitheater with Alex Sampson opening on September 19th 2026 as a part of her sold out Stars Align Tour Leg 3.

== Renovations ==
The Santa Barbara Bowl has undergone over $42 million in renovations since the establishment of the Foundation in 1991.

Year	Renovation Project
1991	Santa Barbara County Board of Supervisors regained control of the Bowl from Old Spanish Days
1992	Renovation and Restoration Master Plan developed by the Foundation
1994	Foundation granted responsibility for the Bowl; Infrastructure Renovations – Power, water and sewer upgraded
1995	Temporary production roof
2000	New storm drain and more efficient drainage systems; Bus Electrical Project; Marquee
2002	The stage and backstage facilities reconstructed increasing the overall usable square footage by +300% (3,000 sq. ft. to 10,000 sq. ft.) (Master Plan Phase 1A): Upgraded dressing rooms; Enlarged and improved restroom facilities; Food concessions (under the Stage)
2003	Seating Upgrades: Permanent, disabled seating platform (Master Plan Phase 1C); Floor Section (Master Plan Phase 1C); Grand Staircase (Master Plan Phase 1C)
2004	The Wendy McCaw Terrace for donor and cultivation receptions (Master Plan Phase 1C); Beverage Concessions (under the Wendy McCaw Terrace) (Master Plan Phase 1C)
2005	The Canteen – Food service upgrade and Food Carts (Master Plan Phase 1D); Hand-rail Project
2006	Backstage Retaining Wall

== See also ==
- List of contemporary amphitheatres
