= The Cup of Fury =

The Cup of Fury may refer to:

- The Cup of Fury (book), a 1956 non-fiction work by Upton Sinclair
- The Cup of Fury (film), a 1920 American silent drama film
