= Day by Day =

Day by Day may refer to:

== Books ==
- "Day by Day", a popular prayer ascribed to Richard of Chichester
- Day by Day (book), a 1973 daily meditation book for alcoholics and addicts

== Music ==
- "Day by Day" (hymn), an 1865 hymn
- Day by Day Entertainment, an American hip hop record label and record distributor

=== Albums ===
- Day by Day (Doris Day album), 1956
- Day by Day (EP), a 2012 EP by South Korean girl group T-ara
- Day by Day (Femi Kuti album), 2008
- Day by Day (Fly to the Sky album)
- Day by Day (Hebe Tien album), July 2016
- Day by Day (Yolanda Adams album), 2005
- Day by Day, by Bet.e & Stef
- Day by Day, a series of Beatles bootleg recordings
- Day by Day with Cilla, a 1973 album by Cilla Black
- "Day by Day" (EP), a 2012 EP by T-ara
- Day by Day, a 2022 album by Timothy B. Schmit

=== Songs ===
- "Day by Day" (1945 song), a song written by Axel Stordahl, Paul Weston and Sammy Cahn
- "Day by Day" (Godspell song), a 1971 song from the musical Godspell
- "Day by Day" (Big Bang song), 2012 song by Big Bang, also known as "Haru Haru"
- "Day by Day" (Regina song), 1997
- "Day by Day" (The Hooters song), 1985
- "Day by Day", a song by Badmarsh & Shri from the album Signs
- "Day by Day", a song by Dajae
- "Day by Day", a song by DC Talk from Jesus Freak
- "Day by Day", a song by Five for Fighting from Message for Albert, 1997
- "Day by Day", a song by Janis Ian from Night Rains
- "Day by Day", a song by Kevin Ayers from The Confessions of Dr. Dream and Other Stories, 1974

== Other ==
- Day by Day (webcomic), an American political webcomic by Chris Muir
- Day by Day (American TV series), a 1980s American sitcom
- Day by Day (Soviet TV series)
- Day by Day, a Southern Television news programme
- Day by Day (film), a 1951 Spanish drama film
- Day by Day Christian Ministries, an evangelical Christian organisation based in the Philippines.

== See also ==
- Day to Day, a 2003–2009 radio programme in the United States
- Day After Day (disambiguation)
- Day to Day
- Daily (disambiguation)
