= Hugh Cunningham (historian) =

British historian (b. 1942)

Hugh St Clair Cunningham (born 1942) is a historian and retired academic. A specialist in the history of childhood, nationalism, philanthropy and leisure, he is an emeritus professor of social history at the University of Kent.

== Career ==
Born in 1942, Cunningham completed a Bachelor of Arts degree at the University of Cambridge, graduating in 1963. He was then a lecturer at the University of Sierra Leone from 1963 to 1966. He returned to studying, completing a doctorate at the University of Sussex; his DPhil was awarded in 1969 for his thesis "British Public Opinion and the Eastern Question 1877–1878".

In 1969, Cunningham became a lecturer at the University of Kent, where he was promoted to a senior lecturership in 1984 and then to be professor of social history in 1991. He was still on the faculty at the end of the 2001–2002 year, but had retired by March 2004. He was appointed an emeritus professor on retirement. In a staff profile, he listed his specialisms as: the "history of childhood; leisure; popular nationalism; British history 1832–1918". More recently, he has studied charity and philanthropy.

== Bibliography ==
Books

- Cunningham, Hugh (1975). The Volunteer Force: A Social and Political History 1859–1908. London: Croom Helm. ISBN 9780856642579.
- Cunningham, Hugh (1980). Leisure in the Industrial Revolution, c. 1780–c. 1880. London: Croom Helm. ISBN 9780312478940.
- Cunningham, Hugh (1991). The Children of the Poor: Representations of Childhood since the Seventeenth Century. Oxford: Blackwell. ISBN 9780631171621.
- Cunningham, Hugh (1995). Children and Childhood in Western Society since 1500. London: Longman. ISBN 9780582238534.
- Cunningham, Hugh; Viazzo, Pier Paolo, eds. (1996). Child Labour in Historical Perspective, 1800–1985: Studies from Europe, Japan and Colombia (PDF). Florence: UNICEF International Child Development Centre. ISBN 9788885401273.
- Cunningham, Hugh, ed. (1996). Barn og Barndom fra Middelalder til Moderne Tid. Oslo: Ad Notam Gyldendal. ISBN 9788241707117.
- Cunningham, Hugh; Innes, Joanna, eds. (1998). Charity, Philanthropy and Reform: From the 1690s to 1850. Basingstoke: Macmillan Press. ISBN 9781349266838.
- Cunningham, Hugh (2001). The Challenge of Democracy: Britain, 1832–1918. Harlow: Pearson Education. ISBN 9780582313040.
- Cunningham, Hugh (2005). Children and Childhood in Western Society since 1500 (2nd ed.). Routledge. doi:10.4324/9781315835495. ISBN 9781315835495.
- Cunningham, Hugh (2006). Die Geschichte des Kindes in der Neuzeit. Düsseldorf: Artemis and Winkler. ISBN 9783538072299.
- Cunningham, Hugh (2006). The Invention of Childhood. London: BBC Books. ISBN 9780563493907.
- Cunningham, Hugh (2007). Grace Darling: Victorian Heroine. London: Hambledon Continuum. ISBN 9781852855482.
- Cunningham, Hugh (2014). Time, Work and Leisure: Life Changes in England since 1700. Studies in Popular Culture. Manchester: Manchester University Press. ISBN 9780719085208.
- Cunningham, Hugh (2020). Children and Childhood in Western Society since 1500 (3rd ed.). Abingdon: Routledge. doi:10.4324/9781003033165. ISBN 9781003033165.
- Cunningham, Hugh (2020). The Reputation of Philanthropy Since 1750: Britain and Beyond. Manchester: Manchester University Press. doi:10.7765/9781526146397. ISBN 9781526146373. S2CID 216333341.

Peer-reviewed articles and chapters

- Cunningham, Hugh (1969). "Jingoism and the Working Classes, 1877–78". Bulletin of the Society for the Study of Labour History. 19: 6–9. doi:10.3828/lhr.19.1.4.
- Cunningham, Hugh (1971). "Jingoism in 1877–78". Victorian Studies. 14 (4): 429–453. JSTOR 3825960.
- Cunningham, Hugh (1977). "The Metropolitan Fairs: A Case Study in the Social Control of Leisure". In Donajgrodzki, A. P. (ed.). Social Control in Nineteenth-Century Britain. London: Croom Helm. pp. 163–184. ISBN 9780874718805.
- Cunningham, Hugh (1981). "The Language of Patriotism, 1750–1914". History Workshop Journal. 12 (1): 8–33. doi:10.1093/hwj/12.1.8.
- Cunningham, Hugh (1981). "Class and Leisure in Mid-Victorian England". In Waites, Bernard; Bennett, Tony; Martin, Graham (eds.). Popular Culture: Past and Present. London: Croom Helm. pp. 66–91. doi:10.4324/9781315002408-11. ISBN 9780415040334.
- Cunningham, Hugh (1985). "Leisure". In Benson, John (ed.). The Working Class in England, 1875–1914. London: Croom Helm. pp. 133–164. ISBN 9781317268802.
- Cunningham, Hugh (1986). "The Conservative Party and Patriotism". In Colls, Robert; Dodd, P. (eds.). Englishness: Politics and Culture, 1880–1920. London: Croom Helm. pp. 283–307. ISBN 9780709945628.
- Cunningham, Hugh (1987). "Child Labour in the Industrial Revolution". The Historian. 14: 3–8.
- Cunningham, Hugh (1990). "The Employment and Unemployment of Children in England, c.1680–1851". Past and Present. 126 (126): 115–150. doi:10.1093/past/126.1.115. JSTOR 650811.
- Cunningham, Hugh (1990). "Leisure and Culture". In Thompson, F. M. L. (ed.). The Cambridge Social History of Britain, 1750–1950. Vol. 2. Cambridge: Cambridge University Press. pp. 279–340. doi:10.1017/CHOL9780521257893.007. ISBN 9781139055598.
- Cunningham, Hugh (1994). "The Rights of the Child from the Mid-Eighteenth to the Early Twentieth Century". Aspects of Education. 50: 2–16.
- Cunningham, Hugh (1994). "The Nature of Chartism". In Catterall, Peter (ed.). Britain 1815–1867. History Briefings. London: Heinemann. pp. 45–50. ISBN 9780435310004.
- Cunningham, Hugh (1995). "Leisure". In Leventhal, Fred M. (ed.). Twentieth-Century Britain: An Encyclopedia. New York and London: Garland Publishing. pp. 450–452. ISBN 9780824072056.
- Cunningham, Hugh; Viazzo, Pier Paolo (1996). "Some Issues in the Historical Study of Child Labour". In Cunningham, Hugh; Viazzo, Pier Paolo (eds.). Child Labour in Historical Perspective, 1800–1985: Studies from Europe, Japan and Colombia (PDF). Florence: UNICEF International Child Development Centre. pp. 11–22. ISBN 9788885401273.
- Cunningham, Hugh (1996). "Combating Child Labour: The British Experience". In Cunningham, Hugh; Viazzo, Pier Paolo (eds.). Child Labour in Historical Perspective, 1800–1985: Studies from Europe, Japan and Colombia (PDF). Florence: UNICEF International Child Development Centre. pp. 41–56. ISBN 9788885401273.
- Cunningham, Hugh (1996). "The History of Childhood". In Hwang, C. Philip; Lamb, Michael E.; Sigel, Irving E. (eds.). Images of Childhood. Mahwah, N.J.: Lawrence Erlbaum Associates. pp. 27–35. ISBN 9780805817010.
- Cunningham, Hugh (1998). "Histories of Childhood". The American Historical Review. 103 (4): 1195–1208. doi:10.1086/ahr/103.4.1195. JSTOR 2651207.
- Cunningham, Hugh (1998). "Introduction". In Cunningham, Hugh; Innes, Joanna (eds.). Charity, Philanthropy and Reform: From the 1690s to 1850. Basingstoke: Macmillan Press. pp. 1–15. ISBN 9781349266838.
- Cunningham, Hugh (2000). "The Decline of Child Labour: Labour Markets and Family Economies in Europe and North America since 1830". The Economic History Review. 53 (3): 409–428. doi:10.1111/1468-0289.00165.
- Cunningham, Hugh (2001). "The Rights of the Child and the Wrongs of Child Labour: An Historical Perspective". In Leiten, Kristoffel; White, Ben (eds.). Child Labour: Policy Options. Amsterdam: Aksant Academic Publishers. pp. 13–26. ISBN 9789052600086.
- Cunningham, Hugh (2003). "Children's Changing Lives from 1800 to 2000". In Maybin, Janet; Woodhead, Martin (eds.). Childhoods in Context. Chichester: John Wiley and the Open University. pp. 81–128. ISBN 9780470846933.
- Cunningham, Hugh (2003). "Elites and the Army in Britain, 1850–1950". In Bosbach, Franz; Robbins, Keith; Urbach, Karina (eds.). Geburt oder Leistung?: Elitenbildung im Deutsch-Britischen Vergleich. Prinz-Albert-Studien. Vol. 21. Munich: K. G. Saur. pp. 91–100. doi:10.1515/9783110967968.91. ISBN 9783110967968.
- Cunningham, Hugh (2004). "Childhood Histories". Journal of Victorian Culture. 9 (1): 90–96. doi:10.3366/jvc.2004.9.1.90.
- Cunningham, Hugh (2005). "How Many Children Were 'Unemployed' in Eighteenth- and Nineteenth-Century England?: Reply". Past and Present. 187 (187): 203–215. doi:10.1093/pastj/gti006. JSTOR 3600711.
- Cunningham, Hugh; Stromquist, Shelton (2005). "Child Labour and the Rights of Children: Historical Patterns of Decline and Persistence". In Weston, Burns H. (ed.). Child Labour and Human Rights: Making Children Matter. London: Lynne Rienner. pp. 55–83. ISBN 9781588263247.
- Cunningham, Hugh (2008). "Dickens as a Reformer". In Paroissien, David (ed.). A Companion to Charles Dickens. Blackwell Companions to Literature and Culture. Oxford: Wiley-Blackwell. pp. 159–173. doi:10.1002/9780470691908.ch10. ISBN 9781405130974.
- Cunningham, Hugh (2011). Lieten, Kristoffel; van Nederveen Meerkerk, Elise (eds.). Child Labour's Global Past, 1650-2000. International and Comparative Social History. Bern: Peter Lang. pp. 61–74. doi:10.3726/978-3-0351-0218-5. ISBN 9783034305174.
- Cunningham, Hugh (2012). "Saving the Children, c.1830–c.1920". In Morrison, Heidi (ed.). The Global History of Childhood Reader. Routledge Readers in History. London: Routledge. pp. 359–374. ISBN 9780415782494.
- Cunningham, Hugh (2016). "The Multi-Layered History of Western Philanthropy". In Jung, Tobias; Phillips, Susan D.; Harrow, Jenny (eds.). The Routledge Companion to Philanthropy. The Routledge Companions. Abingdon: Routledge. pp. 42–55. doi:10.4324/9781315740324. ISBN 9781315740324.
- Cunningham, Hugh (2016). "Philanthropy and Its Critics: A History". In Morvaridi, Behrooz (ed.). New Philanthropy and Social Justice: Debating the Conceptual and Policy Discourse. Bristol: Policy Press. pp. 17–32. doi:10.1332/policypress/9781447316978.001.0001. ISBN 9781447316992.
