= Laura McKowen =

- Occupation: Writer
- Writing career
- Subject: Sobriety
- Website: www.lauramckowen.com

Laura McKowen is an American writer whose work focuses on sobriety. She has written two books: We Are The Luckiest: The Surprising Magic of a Sober Life (2020) and Push Off From Here: Nine Essential Truths to Get You Through Life (and Everything Else) (2023). McKowen runs an online sobriety support community called The Luckiest Club.
