= Dog Flowers =

2021 book by Danielle Geller

Dog Flowers: A Memoir
- Author: Danielle Geller
- Language: English
- Genre: Memoir
- Set in: United States
- Publisher: Penguin Random House, Oneworld Publications
- Publication date: 2021
- Publication place: United States
- Media type: Print
- Pages: 260
- ISBN: 978-1984820396
- OCLC: 1143840974
- Dewey Decimal: E99.N3 G357 2021
- LC Class: 2020006990

Dog Flowers is a 2021 memoir written by Danielle Geller and published by Penguin Random House and Oneworld Publications. The memoir is an account of Geller's response to her mother's death, and her identity as a Navajo woman. The text addresses how Geller comes to understand her mother's life through the suitcases containing her personal effects, the book includes images taken from the suitcases' contents. The narrative explores Geller's childhood, and her experiences of abuse. The book addresses mothering and family difficulties in relationship to the impact of colonization.

== Writing ==
Geller's mother died of alcohol withdrawal in 2013 while homeless, leaving behind "diaries, photos, letters, and other personal documents" which Geller collected. Having been distanced from her mother and wanting "to better understand a woman she hardly knew", Geller, trained as an archivist, used these documents to reconstruct her mother's story. Through the writing process, Geller corresponded with her sister Eileen who was during that time in jail. Geller remarked that "it was really important that I share it with people that I was writing about", acknowledging that "writing a book like this has the potential to end a relationship".

== Reception ==
Dog Flowers was a finalist for the 2022 Hubert Evans Non-Fiction Prize. The book was also a finalist for the 2022 Jim Deva Prize for Writing That Provokes award. In April 2021, Dogflowers was selected by WGBH (FM)'s for their 'Bookmarked' book club. Describing the book as a "heart wrenching memoir about generational trauma", Shannon Carlin of Refinery29 listed Dogflowers as one of "22 Great Books To Kick Off Your New Year’s Resolution To Read More" in 2021.

A review in The Seattle Times by Connor Goodwin listed Dog Flowers among "three new memoirs [that] are well worth reading", describing Dog Flowers as requiring "some emotional fortitude" to read. A review by Joan Gaylord in The Christian Science Monitor framed the book as drawing attention to "how the threads of addiction can weave through generations", and praised Geller's "simple, direct writing style". Gaylord summarized that "it is Geller's strength, her honesty, and her kindness that provide the means to untangle her family history".

Ms. Magazine summarized the book as "a candid and achingly fractured memoir of her mother, her family, her Navajo heritage and her own journey to self-discovery and acceptance" and listed Dog Flowers among its "most anticipated reads for 2021".

Writing in The Southern Review of Books, Nikki Leahy described Dog Flowers as "a portrait of modern reservation life" and "a poignant attempt to understand the author’s mother". Leahy summarized the book as a "masterful memoir", praising Dog Flowers as "a work of art that is at once painful and triumphant".

Dog Flowers was featured on Esquire Magazine's list of the "50 Best Books of 2021". Esquire described the book as "formally ambitious" and a "transcendent story", summarizing that Geller writes "with deep compassion about the limitations of the people we love".

== Author ==
Danielle Geller is a Navajo writer and an assistant professor of writing at the University of Victoria. She teaches creative writing at the Institute of American Indian Arts. Geller earned an MFA in creative writing for nonfiction at the University of Arizona. She was a recipient of the 2016 Rona Jaffe Foundation Writers' Award. Geller lives in British Columbia.
