= Day After Day =

Day After Day may refer to:

- "Day After Day" (Badfinger song)
  - Day After Day: Live, a 1990 album by Badfinger
- "Day After Day (The Show Must Go On)", a song by The Alan Parsons Project from I Robot
- "Day After Day" (Def Leppard song), 2000
- "Day After Day" (Elnur Hüseynov and Samir Javadzadeh song)
- "Dag efter dag" (English: "Day after day"), a song by Chips
- "Day After Day", a song by Dallas Smith from Dallas Smith
- "Day After Day", a song by Exo from Obsession
- "Day After Day", a song by Haji's Kitchen
- "Day After Day", a song by FreQuency for the trailer of Armored Core: Verdict Day
- "Day After Day", a song by Hooverphonic from Hooverphonic Presents Jackie Cane
- "Day After Day", a song by Julian Lennon from Photograph Smile
- "Day After Day", a song by NCT 127 from Blingy
- "Day After Day", a song by The Pretenders from Pretenders II
- "Day After Day (It's Slippin' Away)", a song by Shango
- "Day After Day", a song by the Vels from Velocity
- Day After Day (1943 film) (Russian: Den za Dnyom), a Russian film with a screenplay by Aleksei Kapler
- Day After Day (1998 film) (Hebrew: Yom Yom), an Israeli film starring Moshe Ivgy
- Day After Day (film), a 1962 Canadian documentary film

== See also ==
- Day by Day (disambiguation)
