= The Cup of Fury (book) =

1956 book by Upton Sinclair

- First edition (publ. Channel Press)
- Author: Upton Sinclair
- Language: English
- Publication date: 1956

The Cup of Fury is a 1956 non-fiction work by Upton Sinclair describing how alcohol affected the lives of many writers including Jack London, Ben Hecht and Hart Crane.
