= Abstinence =

Self-enforced restraint from pleasurable activities

Abstinence is the practice of self-enforced restraint from indulging in bodily activities that are widely experienced as giving pleasure. Most frequently, the term refers to sexual abstinence, but it can also mean abstinence from alcohol, drugs, food, or other comforts.

Because the regimen is intended to be a conscious act, freely chosen to enhance life, abstinence is sometimes distinguished from the psychological mechanism of repression. The latter is an unconscious state, having unhealthy consequences.

== Abstinence in religion ==
Abstinence may arise from an ascetic over indulgent, hasidic point of view in natural ways of procreation, present in most faiths, or from a subjective need for spiritual discipline. In its religious context, abstinence is meant to elevate the believer beyond the normal life of desire, to a chosen ideal, by following a path of renunciation.

In Judaism, Christianity and Islam, amongst others, pre-marital sex is prohibited.

=== Judaism ===
For Jews, the principal day of fast is Yom Kippur, the Day of Atonement.

=== Christianity ===
In Western Christianity, Roman Catholics abstain from meat on Ash Wednesday and on Fridays except solemnities. During the Christian season of repentance, Lent, many Lutheran Christians abstain from alcohol and meat on Fridays. In the Anglican Communion, the Book of Common Prayer prescribes certain days as days for fasting and abstinence, "consisting of the 40 days of Lent, the ember days, the three rogation days (the Monday to Wednesday following the Sunday after Ascension Day), and all Fridays in the year (except Christmas Day, if it falls on a Friday)". Catholics distinguish between fasting and abstinence; the former referring to the discipline of diminishing intake of bodily pleasures, and the latter signifying the discipline of completely restraining from bodily pleasures, most notably meats on Fridays (for example, there is the Traditional Catholic practice of fasting from food and liquids from midnight until the reception of Holy Communion). Some Protestants, especially Methodists and Baptists, abstain from drinking alcohol and the use of tobacco; additionally, all Fridays of the year are days of fasting and abstinence from meat in Methodist Christianity (except Christmas Day, if it falls on a Friday). In Western Christianity, abstinence from meat on Fridays is done as a sacrifice because on Good Friday, Jesus sacrificed his flesh for humanity.

In many Western Christian Churches, including those of the Catholic, Methodist, and Baptist traditions, certain congregations have committed to undertaking the Daniel Fast during the whole season of Lent, in which believers practice abstinence from meat, dairy,and alcohol for the entire forty days of the liturgical season.

Orthodox Christians abstain from food and drink from midnight on the day they receive Holy Communion, and abstain from meat and dairy on Wednesdays and Fridays throughout the year, as well as during Great Lent. During Great Lent, Orthodox Christians practice sexual abstinence.

The Seventh-day Adventist Church encourages the consumption of only clean meats as specified in Leviticus and forbids the consumption of alcohol, smoking, and the use of narcotics.

Members of The Church of Jesus Christ of Latter-Day Saints abstain from certain foods and drinks by combining spiritual discipline with health concerns. They also fast one day a month, for both spiritual and charitable reasons (the money saved by skipping meals is donated to the needy).

=== Islam ===
For Muslims, the period of fasting lasts during the whole month of Ramadan (generally spans 29 or 30 days depending on Lunar cycle), from dawn to dusk. Religiously and traditionally, Observable abstinence follows In the said practice, as with fast, Muslims discontinue or impose and enforce restrictions regarding immoral or addictive habits etc and may also avoid routinely based pleasurable activities completely aside from not eating, drinking during the fasting hours as a way to cleanse and purify the mental and spiritual state of being.

=== Hinduism, Jainism, Buddhism and Sikhism (Dharmic) ===
In India, Buddhists, Jains, Sikhs and Hindus abstain from eating meat and fish (basically, all living animals) on the grounds both of health and of reverence for all sentient forms of life. Total abstinence from feeding on the flesh of cows is a hallmark of Hinduism. In addition, lay and monastic Buddhists refrain from killing any living creature and from consuming intoxicants, and bhikkhus keep vows of celibacy. In Theravada Buddhism, bhikkhus also refrain from eating in the afternoon,and cannot accept money. Jains abstain from violence in any form, and will not consume living creatures or kill bugs or insects. Lord Ayappa devotees who visit the shrine, observe 41 days of fasting which includes abstinence.

== Medicine ==
In medicine, abstinence is the discontinuation of a drug, often an addictive one. This might, in addition to craving after the drug, be expressed as withdrawal syndromes. In the Basic Text of Narcotics Anonymous, a large fellowship following the 12-steps outlined by AA, NA is outlined to be "a program of complete abstinence from all mood or mind-altering substances." This description includes alcohol and is widely known to include any kind of prescription narcotics, like pain-killers (opiates), anti-anxiety medicine (benzodiazepines) or diet pills (stimulants). The practice of abstinence is a learned behavior, and comes slowly over time - time spent listening and sharing in NA and AA meetings, behavioral health psychology group or individualized therapies, and hanging out with people in the recovery support community.

== Types ==
=== Drugs ===
In the context of drug use, individuals may, at some point, decide to abstain from taking the drug following chronic use. Addicts engage in chronic drug use, followed by periods of abstinence, then in many cases relapse. Addicts decide to abstain due to the negative consequences that are often associated with the drug. Depending on the individual, abstinence time may vary. In many cases, individuals relapse, and the cycle begins anew. There are several forms of abstinence that exist. Two common ones are forced and voluntary. Voluntary abstinence refers to an individual actively choosing to stop taking the drug. Forced abstinence occurs when an individual is removed from the drug environment. This makes them unable to have access to the drug. An example of forced abstinence is in-patient rehabilitation treatment, or incarceration. There are three main triggers of relapse: stress, drug re-exposure and drug associated cues. An individual may relapse if they are presented with a stressful situation that compels them to re-administer the drug that they used to take. If the individual is in an environment where they are in contact with the drug, they may feel compelled to engage in drug-taking behaviour (for example, someone who is practicing sobriety that finds themselves in a bar and re-engages in drinking alcohol). Finally, drug associated cues can be the environment in which the person used to administer the drug, or the smell of a cigarette.

Individuals report that when engaging in abstinence, the longer they are not taking the drug, the more they crave it.

==== Nicotine ====
Smoking cessation is the discontinuation of a smoked or vaporized substance, such as tobacco or anything containing nicotine.

==== Alcohol ====
Teetotalism is the practice and promotion of complete abstinence from alcoholic beverages.

Some common reasons for choosing teetotalism are religious, health, family, philosophical or social reasons, and, sometimes, as simply a matter of taste preference. When at drinking establishments, they either abstain from drinking or consume non-alcoholic beverages such as tea, coffee, water, juice, and soft drinks.

Contemporary and colloquial usage has somewhat expanded teetotalism to include strict abstinence from most "recreational" intoxicants (legal and illegal, see controlled substances). Most teetotaller organizations also demand from their members that they do not promote or produce alcoholic intoxicants.

==== Caffeine ====
This systematic review highlights the effectiveness of caffeine abstinence for improving sleep quality.

=== Food ===
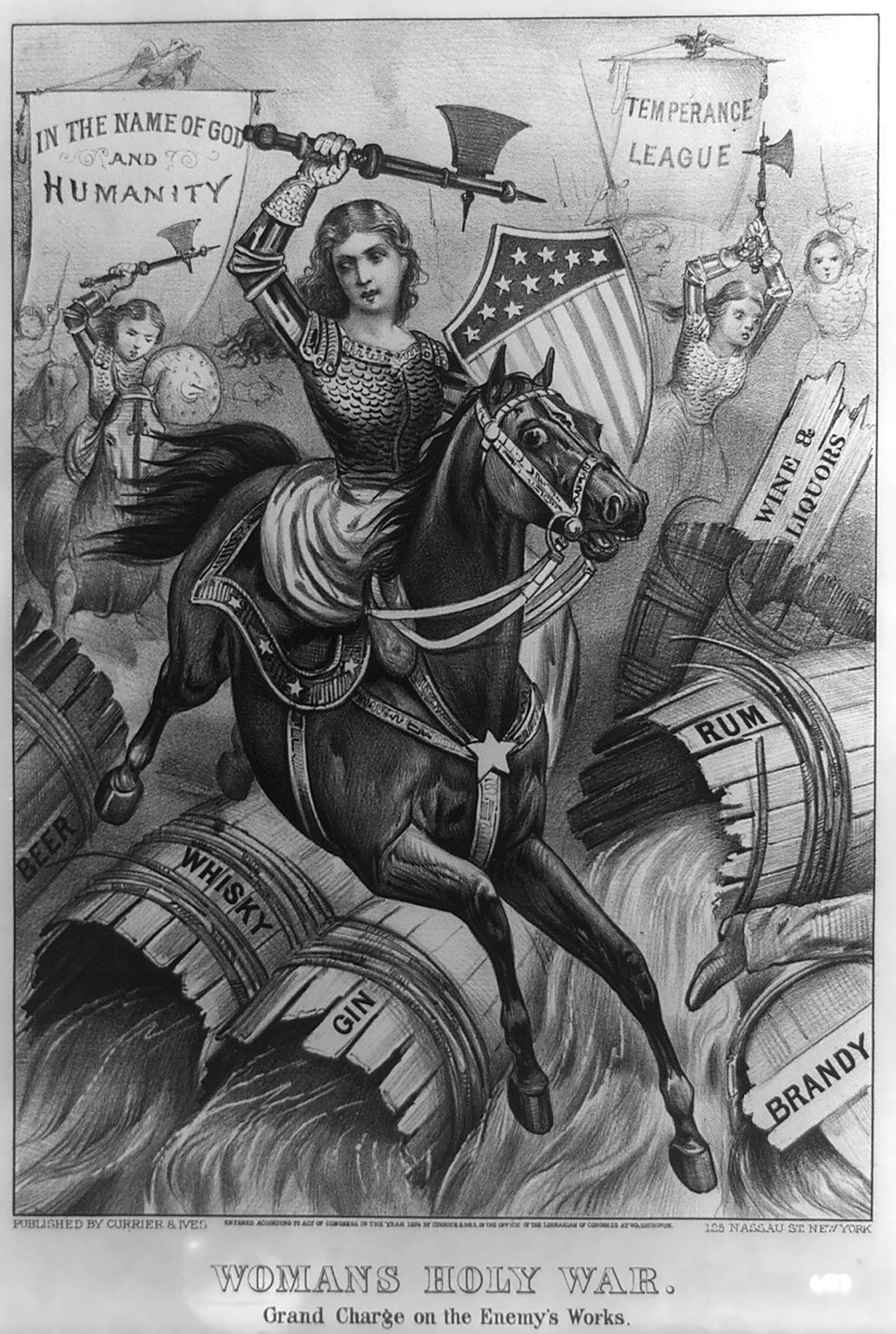
"Woman's Holy War. Grand Charge on the Enemy's Works". An allegorical 1874 political cartoon print by Currier and Ives, which somewhat unusually shows temperance campaigners (alcohol prohibition advocates) as virtuous armored women warriors (riding sidesaddle), wielding axes Carrie-Nation-style to destroy barrels of Beer, Whisky, Gin, Rum, Brandy, Wine and Liquors, under the banners of "In the name of God and humanity" and "Temperance League". The foremost woman bears the shield seen in the Seal of the United States (based on the U.S. flag), suggesting the patriotic motivations of temperance campaigners. The shoe and pants-leg of a fleeing male miscreant are seen at lower right.

Fasting is primarily the act of willingly abstaining from some or all food, drink, or both, for a period of time. A fast may be total or partial concerning that from which one fasts, and may be prolonged or intermittent as to the period of fasting. Fasting practices may preclude sexual activity as well as food, in addition to refraining from eating certain types or groups of foods; for example, one might refrain from eating meat. A complete fast in its traditional definition is abstinence of all food and liquids except for water.

Vegetarianism is the practice of a diet that excludes meat (including game, marine mammals and slaughter by-products), poultry, fowl, fish, shellfish and other sea creatures. There are several variants of the diet, some of which also exclude eggs or products produced from animal labour such as dairy products and honey.

=== Pleasure ===
A general abstinence from pleasures or leisure, either partial or full, may be motivated by ambition, career or general self-respect (excluding the point of view that even the latter examples may be regarded as sources of pleasure).

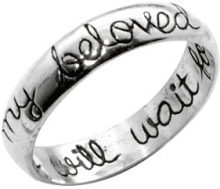
Purity rings are worn by some youth committed to the practice of sexual abstinence.

== Organizations ==
- Alcoholics Anonymous
- Narcotics Anonymous
- Pagans in Recovery
- Rehabilitation for Addicted Prisoners Trust (RAPT)

== See also ==
- Abstinence (psychoanalysis)
- Anatta
- Asceticism
- Celibacy
- Mortification of the flesh
- Temperance
- Self-denial
- List of books about sobriety
