= Day by Day (book) =

1973 meditation book

- Language: English
- Genre: Self-help
- Publisher: Hazelden Publishing
- Publication date: 1974
- ISBN: 0-89486-006-2

Day by Day is a daily meditation book for alcoholics and addicts. It was written in 1973 by members of the Young People's Group of Alcoholics Anonymous in Denver, Colorado. The project was spearheaded by Shelly M., a member of the group who went on to compile Young, Sober & Free and The Pocket Sponsor. Day by Day was written when there were fewer than 200 Narcotics Anonymous meetings held worldwide, and was the group's effort to produce twelve step literature inclusive of addicts. Each day's entry contains a meditation, followed by an open-ended statement after which there is a blank space for writing. Every entry concludes with the sentence, “God help me to stay clean and sober today!”
