= Quit lit (alcohol cessation) =

Literary genre

Quit lit is a literary genre on alcohol cessation, the name can be interpreted as "literature of quitting" or "quit being lit (drunk)". Examples include the Alcoholics Anonymous Big Book, as well as self-help books. Recent books, in particular in partially autobiographic ones focus on women, examples include Wishful Drinking and This Naked Mind.

== See also ==
- Category:Memoirs about alcoholism
