= Janicki =

Janicki (feminine: Janicka) is a Polish surname derived from the place named Janice (disambiguation). Notable people with the surname include:

- Aleksander Janicki (born 1963), Polish artist
- Czesław Janicki (1926–2012), Polish scientist and politician
- Don Janicki (born 1960), American long-distance runner
- Greg Janicki (born 1984), American soccer player
- Jagna Janicka (born 1959), Polish costume and scene designer
- Jerzy Janicki (1928–2007), Polish writer
- Jerzy Stanisław Janicki (born 1956), Polish physicist
- Kamil Janicki (born 1987), historian and writer
- Klemens Janicki (1516–1543), Polish poet
- Konstanty Janicki (1876–1932), Polish parasitologist
- Michał Janicki (born 1982), Polish footballer
- Rafał Janicki (born 1992), Polish footballer
- Robert Janicki (born 1997), Polish footballer
- Wanda Janicka (1923–2023), Polish architect
