= Commonplace book =

Method of knowledge compiling

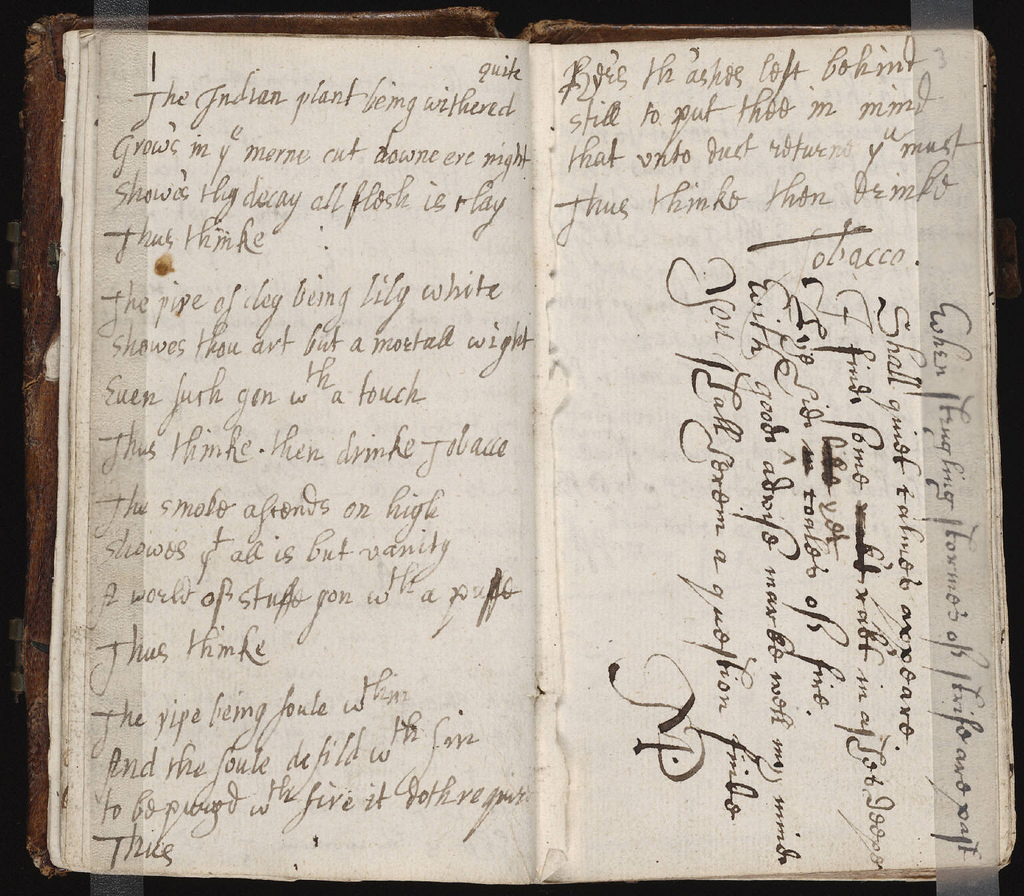
A commonplace book from the mid-seventeenth century

Commonplace books (or commonplaces) are personal notebooks used to compile any information the owner finds interesting or useful. They can variously contain notes, proverbs, adages, aphorisms, maxims, recipes, quotes, letters, poems, tables of weights and measures, prayers, legal formulas, and other professional references. They have been kept from antiquity, and were kept particularly during the Renaissance and in the nineteenth century.

Entries are most often organized under systematic subject headings and differ functionally from journals or diaries, which are chronological and introspective.

== Overview ==
"Commonplace" is a calque of the Latin term locus communis (from Greek tópos koinós, see literary topos), which means "a general or common place", such as a statement of proverbial wisdom. In this original sense, commonplace books were collections of such sayings, for example John Milton's. "Commonplace book" is at times used with an expansive sense, referring to collections by an individual in one volume which have a common theme (e.g. ethics) or explore several themes. The term overlaps with aspects of the terms "anthology" or "mixed-manuscript" in these productions, but most properly refers to a collection of sayings or excerpts by an individual, often collected under thematic headings.

Commonplaces are a separate genre of writing from diaries or travelogues. Commonplaces are used by readers, writers, students, and scholars as an aid for remembering useful concepts or facts; sometimes they were required of young women as evidence of their mastery of social roles and as demonstrations of the correctness of their upbringing. They became significant in Early Modern Europe. As a genre, commonplace books were generally private collections of information, but as the amount of information grew following the invention of movable type and printing became less expensive, some were published for the general public.

In 1685, the English Enlightenment philosopher John Locke wrote a treatise in French on commonplace books, translated into English in 1706 as A New Method of Making Common-Place-Books, "in which techniques for entering proverbs, quotations, ideas, speeches were formulated." Locke gave specific advice on how to arrange material by subject and category, using such key topics as love, politics, or religion. Following the publication of his work, publishers often printed empty commonplace books with space for headings and indices to be filled in by their users. An example is "Bell's Common-Place Book, Formed generally upon the Principles Recommended and Practised by Mr Locke", which was published by John Bell almost a century after Locke's treatise. A copy of this blank commonplace was used by Erasmus Darwin from 1776 to 1787, and it was later used by Charles Darwin, who called it "the great book" when composing his grandfather's biography.

By the early eighteenth century, they had become an information management device in which a note-taker stored quotations, observations, and definitions. They were used in private households to collate ethical or informative texts, sometimes alongside recipes or medical formulae. For women, who were excluded from formal higher education, the commonplace book could be a repository of intellectual references. The gentlewoman Elizabeth Lyttelton kept one from the 1670s to 1713 and a typical example was published by Mrs Anna Jameson in 1855, including headings such as Ethical Fragments, Theological, Literature, and Art.

Commonplace books were used by scientists and other thinkers in the same way that a database might now be used: Carl Linnaeus, for instance, used commonplacing techniques to invent and arrange the nomenclature of his Systema Naturae (which is the basis for the system used by scientists today).

The commonplace system of categorized note-keeping was not restricted to books. In the twentieth century, Henri de Lubac traveled with his notes in a sack. Erasmus of Rotterdam traveled with a chest of notes, including examples of well-written Latin that formed the basis of his Adagia. In De Copia, his Method of Collecting Examples (Ratio colligendi exempla) advocated a hierarchical but ad hoc breakdown of topics: for example, the top level might be Piety and Impiety, under Piety might come Gratitude, and under these headings one puts example texts. The commonplace proper would be some simple aphorism or moral, possibly several, that can be drawn from the example, such as The crowd loves and hates thoughtlessly.

As a result of the development of information technology, there exist various software applications that perform the functions that paper-based commonplace books served for previous generations of thinkers.

== History ==
=== Philosophical origins ===
Beginning in Topica, Aristotle distinguished between forms of argumentation and referred to them as commonplaces. He extended the idea in Rhetoric, where he suggested that they also be used to explore the validity of propositions through rhetoric. Cicero in his own Topica and De Oratore further clarified the idea of commonplaces and applied them to public speaking. He also created a list of commonplaces which included sententiae or wise sayings or quotations by philosophers, statesmen, and poets. Quintilian further expanded these ideas in Institutio Oratoria, a treatise on rhetoric education, and asked his readers to commit their commonplaces to memory. He also framed these commonplaces in moral and ethical overtones.

While there are ancient compilations by writers including Pliny and Diogenes Laertius, many authors in the Renaissance credited Aulus Gellius as the founder of the genre with his commonplace Attic Nights.

In the first century AD, Seneca the Younger suggested that readers collect commonplace ideas and sententiae as a bee collects pollen, and by imitation turn them into their own honey-like words. By late antiquity, the idea of employing commonplaces in rhetorical settings was well established.

Stobaeus, a writer usually placed in the fifth century, compiled an extensive two-volume manuscript commonly known as The Anthologies, containing excerpts from 1,430 works of poetry and prose; all but 315 of these works are lost except for Stobaeus's quotations.

In the sixth century, Boethius translated the work of both Aristotle and Cicero and created his own account of commonplaces in De topicis differentiis.

=== Florilegium ===
By the eighth century, the idea of commonplaces was used, primarily in religious contexts, by preachers and theologians, to collect excerpted passages from the Bible or from approved Church Fathers. Early in this time period, passages were collected and arranged in the order of their appearance in the works from which they were taken, but by the thirteenth century they were more commonly arranged under thematic headings. These religious anthologies were referred to as florilegia, which translates as gatherings of flowers. Often these collections were used by their creators to compose sermons.

=== Early examples ===
Precursors to the commonplace book were the records kept by Roman and Greek philosophers of their thoughts and daily meditations, often including quotations from other thinkers. The practice of keeping a journal such as this was particularly recommended by Stoics such as Seneca and Marcus Aurelius, whose own work Meditations (second century AD) was originally a private record of thoughts and quotations. The Pillow Book of Sei Shōnagon, a courtier of tenth- or eleventh-century Japan, is likewise a private book of anecdote and poetry, daily thoughts and lists. However, none of these include the wider range of sources usually associated with commonplace books.

A number of Renaissance scholars kept something resembling a commonplace book – for example, Leonardo da Vinci, who described his notebook exactly as a commonplace book is structured: "A collection without order, drawn from many papers, which I have copied here, hoping to arrange them later each in its place, according to the subjects of which they treat." French encyclopedist Jean Bodin used the commonplace book as "an arsenal of 'factoids'."

=== Zibaldone ===
Zibaldone di pensieri, written by the Italian poet Giacomo Leopardi

During the course of the fifteenth century, the Italian peninsula was the site of the development of two new forms of book production: the deluxe registry book and the zibaldone (or hodgepodge book). What differentiated these two forms was their language of composition: a vernacular. Giovanni Rucellai, the compiler of one of the most sophisticated examples of the genre, defined it as a "salad of many herbs".

Zibaldone were always paper codices of small or medium format – never the large desk copies of registry books or other display texts. They also lacked the lining and extensive ornamentation of other deluxe copies. Rather than miniatures, a zibaldone often incorporates the author's sketches. Zibaldone were in cursive scripts (first chancery minuscule and later mercantile minuscule) and contained what paleographer Armando Petrucci describes as "an astonishing variety of poetic and prose texts". Devotional, technical, documentary, and literary texts appear side by side in no discernible order. The juxtaposition of taxes paid, currency exchange rates, medicinal remedies, recipes, and favorite quotations from Augustine and Virgil portrays a developing secular, literate culture.

By far the most popular literary selections were the works of Dante Alighieri, Francesco Petrarca, and Giovanni Boccaccio: the "Three Crowns" of the Florentine vernacular traditions. These collections have been used by modern scholars as a source for interpreting how merchants and artisans interacted with the literature and visual arts of the Florentine Renaissance.

The best-known zibaldone is Giacomo Leopardi's nineteenth-century Zibaldone di pensieri. It significantly departs, however, from the early modern genre of commonplace books, being comparable rather to the intellectual diary that was practiced by, for example, Lichtenberg, Joubert, Coleridge, and Valéry, among others.

=== English ===
By the seventeenth century, commonplacing had become a recognized practice that was formally taught to college students in such institutions as Oxford. John Locke appended his indexing scheme for commonplace books to a printing of his An Essay Concerning Human Understanding. The commonplace tradition in which Francis Bacon and John Milton were educated had its roots in the pedagogy of classical rhetoric, and "commonplacing" persisted as a popular study technique until the early twentieth century. Commonplace books were used by many key thinkers of the Enlightenment, with authors like the philosopher and theologian William Paley using them to write books. Both Ralph Waldo Emerson and Henry David Thoreau were taught to keep commonplace books at Harvard University (their commonplace books survive in published form).

However, it was also a domestic and private practice that was particularly attractive to authors. Some, such as Samuel Taylor Coleridge, Mark Twain, and Virginia Woolf, kept messy reading notes that were intermixed with other quite various material; others, such as Thomas Hardy, followed a more formal reading-notes method that mirrored the original Renaissance practice more closely. The older, "clearinghouse" function of the commonplace book, to condense and centralize useful and even "model" ideas and expressions, became less popular over time.

== Examples ==
=== Manuscripts ===
- Adelaide Horatio Seymour Spencer, nineteenth-century gentlewoman. Held in Van Pelt Library, University of Pennsylvania.
- Glastonbury Miscellany (Trinity College, Cambridge, MS O.9.38). Originally designed as an account book.
- Isaac Newton (1643–1727), mathematician and physicist. Held at the University of Cambridge, with a digitized version freely available to view online. He developed the calculus in a commonplace book which he called his waste book.
- Jean Miélot, fifteenth-century Burgundian translator and author. His book is held in the Bibliothèque nationale de France and is the main source for his verses, many of which were written for court occasions.
- Loci communes (Pseudo-Maximus), a late ninth- or early tenth-century florilegium
- Richard Hill, a London grocer (Oxford, Balliol College, MS 354).
- Robert Reynes of Acle, Norfolk (Oxford, Bodleian Library, MS Tanner 407).
- Virginia Woolf, twentieth-century novelist. Some of her notebooks are held at Smith College in Massachusetts.
- Zibaldone da Canal merchant's commonplace book (New Haven, CT, Beinecke Rare Book & Manuscript Library, MS 327)

=== Published examples ===
- Mrs Anna Jameson, A Common Place Book of Thoughts, Memories and Fancies (London: Longman, Brown, Green and Longmans, 1855)
- W. Ross Ashby (1903–1972) started a commonplace book in a journal in May 1928 as a medical student. He kept it for 44 years until his death, at which point it occupied 25 volumes comprising 7,189 pages and was indexed with 1,600 index cards. The British Library created a digital archive of his commonplace book, which has been published online with extensive cross-linking based on his original index: ashby.info. Old site:
- W.H. Auden, A Certain World (New York: The Viking Press, 1970).
- Francis Bacon, The Promus of Formularies and Elegancies, Longmans, Green and Company, London, 1883. Bacon's Promus was a rough list of elegant and useful phrases gleaned from reading and conversation that Bacon used as a sourcebook in writing and probably also as a promptbook for oral practice in public speaking.
- Robert Burns, Robert Burns's Commonplace Book. 1783–1785. James Cameron Ewing and Davidson Cook (eds.). Glasgow: Gowans and Gray Ltd., 1938.
- E.M. Forster, Commonplace Book, ed. Philip Gardner (Stanford: Stanford University Press, 1985).
- The Houghton Club, which holds the fishing rights to more than a dozen miles of the River Test, kept a club commonplace book from 1827–1902, filled with manuscript text and drawings, with numerous letters and drawings by members tipped in. A limited edition facsimile was printed for members (London: Atelier Press, 2019).
- Thomas Jefferson, Literary Commonplace Book (D.L. Wilson, ed., Princeton University Press, 1989)
- Thomas Jefferson, Legal Commonplace Book (David Thomas Konig and Michael P. Zuckert, eds., Princeton University Press, 2019)
- Ben Jonson, Timber; or, Discoveries, made upon men and matter, as they have flow'd out of his daily Readings, or had their reflux to his peculiar Notion of the Times (London, 1641).
- Lovecraft, H.P. (4 July 2011). "Commonplace Book". H.P. Lovecraft's Commonplace Book. Wired. Transcribed by Bruce Sterling.
- The Commonplace Book of Elizabeth Lyttelton (Cambridge University Press, 1919)
- John Man, Commonplaces of Christian Religion (London, 1578)
- John Marbeck, A book of notes and commonplaces…collected and gathered out of the works of diverse singular writers and brought alphabetically into order (London, 1581).
- Philip Melanchthon, Loci communes, 1521 (Internet Archive)
- John Milton, Milton's Commonplace Book, in John Milton: Complete Prose Works, gen. ed. Don M. Wolfe (New Haven: Yale University Press, 1953). Milton kept scholarly notes from his reading, complete with page citations to use in writing his tracts and poems.
- Ronald Reagan (1911–2004) kept a commonplace book with traditional commonplace headings, using index cards that "were kept in the plastic sleeves of a black photo album". They are held at the Ronald Reagan Presidential Library. Edited by his biographer Douglas Brinkley, his notes were published as the book The Notes: Ronald Reagan's Private Collection of Stories and Wisdom (HarperCollins, 2011).

== Literary references to commonplacing ==
- Amos Bronson Alcott, 1877: "The habit of journalizing becomes a life-long lesson in the art of composition, an informal schooling for authorship. And were the process of preparing their works for publication faithfully detailed by distinguished writers, it would appear how large were their indebtedness to their diary and commonplaces. How carefully should we peruse Shakespeare's notes used in compiling his plays—what was his, what another's—showing how these were fashioned into the shapely whole we read, how Milton composed, Montaigne, Goethe: by what happy strokes of thought, flashes of wit, apt figures, fit quotations snatched from vast fields of learning, their rich pages were wrought forth! This were to give the keys of great authorship!"
- In Arthur Conan Doyle's Sherlock Holmes stories, Holmes keeps numerous commonplace books, which he sometimes uses when doing research. For example, in "The Adventure of the Veiled Lodger", he researches the newspaper reports of an old murder in a commonplace book.
- In Alan Moore's graphic novel Providence, the protagonist Robert Black keeps a commonplace book; his entries in this book make up the second halves of the novel's chapters, contrasting with the graphic sections.
- In Lemony Snicket's A Series of Unfortunate Events a number of characters including Klaus Baudelaire and the Quagmire triplets keep commonplace books.
- In Michael Ondaatje's The English Patient, Count Almásy uses his copy of Herodotus's Histories as a commonplace book.
- Virginia Woolf, early twentieth century: "[L]et us take down one of those old notebooks which we have all, at one time or another, had a passion for beginning. Most of the pages are blank, it is true; but at the beginning we shall find a certain number very beautifully covered with a strikingly legible hand-writing. Here we have written down the names of great writers in their order of merit; here we have copied out fine passages from the classics; here are lists of books to be read; and here, most interesting of all, lists of books that have actually been read, as the reader testifies with some youthful vanity by a dash of red ink."
- In Susie Dent's 2024 crime mystery novel, Guilty by Definition, a sixteenth-century commonplace book is central to the plot.

== See also ==
- Attic Nights
- Biji (Chinese literature), a similar Chinese genre
- Book of Shadows
- Bullet journal
- Card file
- Commentarii
- Family cookbooks
- Hypomnema
- Knowledge organization
- Memex
- Memoranda books
- Miscellany
- Notebook (style)
- Notetaking
  - Comparison of notetaking software
- Personal information management
  - List of personal information managers
- Personal knowledge base
- Personal knowledge management
- Personal wiki
  - List of wiki software § Personal wiki software
- Reference management software
- Sammelband
- Silva rerum (also known as sylvae ("forests"))
- Sudelbücher
- Swipe file
- Table-book
- Tag (metadata) § Knowledge tags
- Thesaurus ("treasure chests")
- Vade mecum ("go with me") or handbook
