= Institute for Physico-Medical Research =

Polish research unit

Coordinates: 52°24′27″N 16°55′41″E

The Institute for Physico-Medical Research
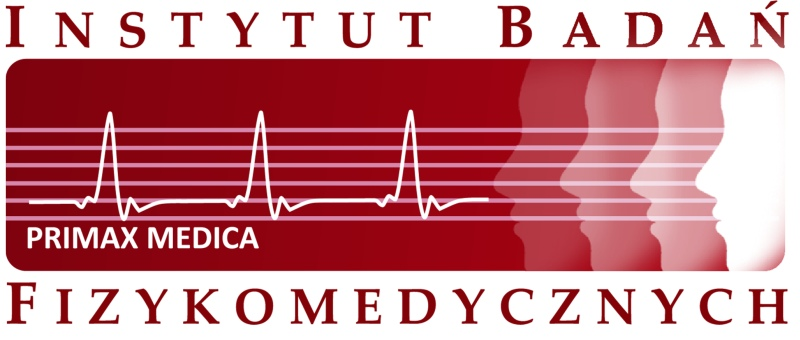
- Established: 1991
- President: Jerzy Stanisław Janicki
- Address: Pl. Wolności 1, 61-738 Poznań
- Location: Poznań, Poland
- Website: http://www.ibf.com.pl

The Institute of Physico-Medical Research (polish: Instytut Badań Fizykomedycznych, IBF), is a Polish research unit that emerged in 1991 as a Research and Development Department of Primax Medic Research, Innovative and Development Company Ltd. It cooperates with specialists from renowned scientific and clinical institutions and has the Scientific Council. Its activities cover developing innovative technologies used in medicine and biotechnology.

== Main Specializations of Scientific Activities ==
The main aim of the specialists focused on the subjects developed in the institute is conducting the research and publishing its results. It concerns in particular the evaluation and analysis of:

- distribution of electric potentials which appear during heart activity and application of these measurements to cardiac diagnosis,
- the influence of inhomogeneous static magnetic fields (NCMF) on living organisms, especially on particular ailments and diseases,
- developing the content and technology of producing medicines, cosmetics, nutriceutics and dietary supplements

There has been developed a new method of analysing the activity cardiac electrical activity SATRO-ECG, which is based on an individual SFHAM model. This method is used in non-invasive diagnosis of heart diseases and it facilitates analysing the processes occurring during depolarization of the myocardium.

The specialists of the Institute have developed a revascular therapy with the usage of nutriceutics and dietary supplements, ready to be implemented with SATRO-ECG method in health care systems.

There has also been calculated the spatial distribution of inhomogeneous constant magnetic field (NCMF) presently used in magnetic products.

Basing on individual solutions developed in the Institute there has been compiled “The Domestic Magneto-Therapy Program as an Initiative to Global Public Health”, which was presented at the Forum of Projects for Public Health of the UN.

== Publications ==
- Leoński, W. (1996). "Quantum and classical dynamics for a pulsed nonlinear oscillator". Physica A: Statistical Mechanics and Its Applications. 233 (1–2). Elsevier BV: 365–378. Bibcode:1996PhyA..233..365L. doi:10.1016/s0378-4371(96)00250-6. ISSN 0378-4371.
- Leoński, W. (1996-10-01). "Fock states in a Kerr medium with parametric pumping". Physical Review A. 54 (4). American Physical Society (APS): 3369–3372. Bibcode:1996PhRvA..54.3369L. doi:10.1103/physreva.54.3369. ISSN 1050-2947. PMID 9913860.
- Chumakov, S M; Kozierowski, M (1996). "Dicke model: quantum nonlinear dynamics and collective phenomena". Quantum and Semiclassical Optics: Journal of the European Optical Society Part B. 8 (4). IOP Publishing: 775–803. Bibcode:1996QuSOp...8..775C. doi:10.1088/1355-5111/8/4/003. ISSN 1355-5111.
- Leon-acuteski, W. (1997-05-01). "Finite-dimensional coherent-state generation and quantum-optical nonlinear oscillator models". Physical Review A. 55 (5). American Physical Society (APS): 3874–3878. Bibcode:1997PhRvA..55.3874L. doi:10.1103/physreva.55.3874. ISSN 1050-2947.
- Janicki JS. Analiza EKG z uwzględnieniem procesów fizycznych zachodzących w mięśniu sercowym. Folia Cardiologica, vol.11, p. 13, Zakopane 2004
- Janicki J. Wpływ gradientowego pola magnetycznego na organizm człowieka. Acta Bio-Optica et Informatica Medica 4/2008, vol. 14, p. 300-301
- Janicki JS. Podstawy zastosowania gradientowego pola magnetycznego w rehabilitacji. Rehabilitacja w praktyce, 1/2009, p. 15
- Janicki, J.S.; Leoński, W.; Jagielski, J. (2009). "Partial potentials of selected cardiac muscle regions and heart activity model based on single fibres". Medical Engineering & Physics. 31 (10). Elsevier BV: 1276–1282. doi:10.1016/j.medengphy.2009.08.007. ISSN 1350-4533. PMID 19762270.
- Janicki JS, Leoński W, Jagielski J, Sobieszczańska M, Chąpiński M, Janicki Ł. Single Fibre Based Heart Activity Model (SFHAM) Based Qrs-Waves Synthesis. W: Sobieszczańska M, Jagielski J, Macfarlane PW, editors. Electrocardiology 2009. JAKS Publishing Company; 2010. p. 81-86, ISBN 978-83-928209-5-6
- Janicki JS, Leoński W, Jagielski J, Sobieszczańska M, Leońska JG. Implementation of SFHAM in Coronary Heart Disease Diagnosis. W: Sobieszczańska M, Jagielski J, Macfarlane PW, editors. Electrocardiology 2009. JAKS Publishing Company; 2010. p. 197-201, ISBN 978-83-928209-5-6
