= Philip van Wilder =

Dutch musician (c. 1500–1554)

Philip van Wilder (Weldre, Welder, Wylder, Wyllender, de Vuildre, Wild, Wildroe; c. 1500 – February 24, 1554) was a lutenist and composer from the Habsburg Netherlands, active in England.

== Life and career ==
=== Early years ===
Like Peter van Wilder, who also worked in the Tudor court and was presumably related to him, Philip was probably born in Millam, near Wormhout, or in the nearby village of Wylder ("Wilder" in Dutch). His father may have been Mathis (Matthew) van Wilder, a lutenist from the court of Philip the Fair of Castile who also worked at the Tudor court from 1506 to 1517. It can be speculated that Peter and Philip were his two sons, and that he used his influence to secure court employment for them in England. It is not known when Philip arrived in England, but since Peter dated his residence in England from 1515, it is possible that the two travelled together. A note in Italian in the Jacobean scorebook anthology GB-Lbl Egerton 3665 describes Philip as "Master Philip of Flanders, musician to King Henry VIII, who lived in England around the year 1520". He was certainly in London by 1522, living in the parish of St Olave's Hart Street (close to the Tower of London) and having £60 "in goodes" and £48 "in fees". The court account books for the year 1525-26 describe him as "mynstrell"; he was later designated "lewter". Van Wilder steadily advanced his position at the Tudor court. By 1529 he was a member of the Privy chamber, the select group of musicians who played to the king in private. He was also active as a merchant, being given a licence to import Toulouse woad and Gascon wine, and in purchasing instruments for the court. He taught the lute to Princess (later Queen) Mary, who rewarded him with a gift on the occasion of his marriage to a woman named Frances in 1537. Later he also taught Prince Edward (later Edward VI), who wrote a letter to his father in 1546 thanking him for "sending me your servant Philip, as excellent in music as he is noble ... that I might become more excellent in striking the lute".

=== Later years ===
In 1539, Van Wilder became a denizen, which allowed him to own land. This enabled him to profit from the dissolution of the monasteries and engage in a number of lucrative property deals with the Crown. At various times he was granted leaseholds on former monastic properties in London, as well as in Middlemarsh (in the parish of Minterne Magna) and Littlebredy in Dorset, previously owned by Cerne Abbey. By 1540 he was a Gentleman of the Privy chamber, a prestigious position that enabled him to accept financial inducements to raise legal issues and private grievances with the King. At the time of Henry VIII's death in 1547 Van Wilder was Keeper of the Instruments and effectively head of the Court instrumental musical establishment, a post later known as Master of the King's Music.

Van Wilder continued to enjoy royal favour during the reign of the boy-king Edward VI (reigned 1547–53). At Edward's coronation he was placed in charge of a special group of nine singing men and boys. He was granted a coat of arms and a crest, and in 1551 was given powers of impressment to recruit boys for the Chapel Royal from anywhere in England. It has sometimes been speculated that Hans Holbein's Man with a Lute, a portrait of a man in French dress with a lute and music books, may be Van Wilder, though a rival claim has been made for John Dudley, the Lord High Admiral. On his death, which took place in London on 24 February 1554, Van Wilder was buried on the south side of the choir in his parish church of St Olave's Hart Street. His tomb was still in existence in 1733, but has since disappeared. An elegy in the poetry anthology known as Tottel's Miscellany (1557) praises Van Wilder's skill as a lutenist:

Bewaile with me all ye that haue profest
Of musicke tharte by touche of coarde or winde:
Laye downe your lutes and let your gitterns rest.
Phillips is dead whose like you can not finde.
Of musicke much exceadyng all the rest,
Muses therfore of force now must you wrest
Your pleasant notes into an other sounde,
The string is broke, the lute is dispossest,
The hand is colde, the bodye in the grounde.
The lowring lute lamenteth now therfore,
Phillips her frende that can her touche no more.

— Henry Howard, Earl of Surrey, et al., Songes and Sonettes (1st edition) ([London]: Apud Ricardum Tottel, 1557 on fol. 70v "On the death of Philip"

Four sons and a daughter survived him; the eldest son, Henry, also became an instrumentalist in the Court establishment.

== Music ==
=== Chansons ===
More than forty compositions by Van Wilder survive in about sixty European and English sources. He was primarily a composer of chansons, of which thirty survive, but there are also seven motets, an English psalm setting, one consort piece and at least one composition for lute. The Continental sources, most of them printed anthologies published between 1544 and 1598, generally give the text and music of the chansons in good order, but the English manuscripts present them in various guises, generally left untexted for instrumental performance or solmization and in arrangements for keyboard, lute, cantus with lute accompaniment, or even with substitute English texts. The most extensive English source is the table-book manuscript GB-Lbm Add. 31390, which contains seventeen textless chansons and motets attributed to ‘Mr Phillipps’. The five-part scoring and imitative textures employed in most of the chansons suggest that Van Wilder took a Flemish stylistic model, contrasting with the lighter, more homophonic style favoured by native French composers. A number of them are resttings of texts already set, sometimes several times, by other composers. The fragmentary En despit des envyeulx (a7) is a canonic treatment of a 15th-century monophonic chanson, and is one of five polyphonic surviving settings. Je dis adieu de tout plaisir (also a7) is a French contrafactum of a Dutch part-song to a text beginning Ik seg adiu, which was also based on a derived melody.

=== Motets ===
The motets are more varied in character, ranging from four to twelve-part scoring. The brief "monster" motet Deo gratias (a12), which was perhaps composed for a state occasion, is a cantus firmus treatment of the plainsong (Liber Usualis Mass XI). A setting of the Dismissal at Mass, it may have been intended to follow a liturgical performance of Antoine Brumel's famous twelve-part Missa Et ecce terrae motus, perhaps during the Anglo-French conference held in Boulogne and Calais in late October 1532. Homo quidam fecit cenam magnam (a7), which sets the plainsong as a cantus firmus in canon, is partly modelled on the setting by Josquin. The others employ the Franco-Flemish technique of through-imitation. Sancte Deus, sancte fortis (a4) has a general similarity of design with Tallis's setting of the same text. Van Wilder made two distinct, though closely related, settings of Aspice Domine quia facta est (a5 and a6). The five-part setting was particularly popular with English musicians, as the seven surviving manuscript sources show. It provided the model for Byrd's Civitas sancti tui (Part II of Ne irascaris Domine) and the source for the famous Non nobis Domine canon, as well as Thomas Morley's canzonet In nets of golden wires published in 1595.. One English manuscript (GB-Ob Tenbury 1464) preserves an interesting version with a substitute text in which the setting is changed from Jerusalem to Thebes, perhaps in order to serve as a play-chorus. The substitute text reads:

Plangete vivos, quia facta est desolata civitas plena misteriis; sedet in tristicia Thebana civitas. O luctuosa proelia infausta natis Oedipi! (2) Eheu ploremus extinctos! Iacet Eteocles, Polinices cecitit et Iocasta extincta est. O luctuosa proelia infausta natis Oedipi! (GB Ob Ten 1464 ff. 3v-5)

(Weep for the living, for the city full of mysteries is laid waste; the Theban city sits in sadness. O lamentable battles, unfavourable to the sons of Oedipus! (2) Alas, let us weep for the dead! Eteocles lies dead, Polynices is fallen and Jocasta is dead. O lamentable battles, unfavourable to the sons of Oedipus!)

The play for which the chorus was intended has not been identified. One possibility is Gascoigne and Kinwelmarsh's Jocasta, which was produced at Gray's Inn in 1566 and contains several cues for music.

=== Other works ===
The English psalm setting Blessed art thou that fearest God (a5) was also popular in Van Wilder's adopted country, providing the model for Byrd's If in thine heart (Songs of sundrie natures, 1589). Four lute pieces from English sources can be attributed to Van Wilder with varying degrees of probability, the best authenticated being a fantasia found in the two Matthew Holmes Lute Books. A curiosity is the Fantasia con pause e senza pause for four-part consort, which can be performed either with or without the rests.

Edition: J. Bernstein, (ed.) Philip van Wilder Collected Works (Masters and Monuments of the Renaissance 4, New York, 1991); Part I: Sacred Works; Part II: Secular works, Instrumental works, Appendices)
