= Commentarii =

Commentarii (Latin, Greek: hupomnemata) are notes to assist the memory, or memoranda. This original idea of the word gave rise to a variety of meanings: notes and abstracts of speeches for the assistance of orators; family memorials, the origin of many of the legends introduced into early Roman history from a desire to glorify a particular family; and diaries of events occurring in their own circle kept by private individuals. An example of this is the day-book drawn up for Trimalchio in Petronius's Satyricon (Satyricon, 53) by his actuarius, a slave to whom the duty was specially assigned. Other commentarii were memoirs of events in which they had taken part drawn up by public men. Examples of these are the Commentaries of Caesar: Commentarii de Bello Gallico on the Gallic Wars and Commentarii de Bello Civili on the civil wars; another example is that of Cicero on his consulship. Different departments of the imperial administration and certain high functionaries kept records, which were under the charge of an official known as a commentariis (cf. a secretis, ab epistulis). Municipal authorities also kept a register of their official acts.

The Commentarii Principis were the register of the official acts of the emperor. They contained the decisions, favourable or unfavourable, in regard to certain citizens; accusations brought before him or ordered by him; and lists of persons in receipt of special privileges. These must be distinguished from the commentarii diurni, a daily court-journal. At a later period records called ephemerides were kept by order of the emperor; these were much used by the collection of biographies known as Scriptores Historiae Augustae (see Augustan History). The Commentarii Senatus, only once mentioned (Tacitus, Annals, xv. 74) are probably identical with the Acta Senatus.

There were also Commentarii of the priestly colleges: (a) Pontificum, collections of their decrees and responses for future reference, to be distinguished from their Annales, which were historical records, and from their Acta, minutes of their meetings; (b) Augurum, similar collections of augural decrees and responses; (c) Decemvirorum; (d) Fratrum Arvalium. Like the priests, the magistrates also had similar notes, partly written by themselves, and partly records of which they formed the subject. But practically nothing is known of these Commentarii Magistratuum. Mention should also be made of the Commentarii Regum, containing decrees concerning the functions and privileges of the kings, and forming a record of the acts of the king in his capacity of priest. They were drawn up in historical times like the so-called leges regiae (jus Papirianum), supposed to contain the decrees and decisions of the Roman kings.

== See also ==
- Commonplace book
- Hypomnema
- Silva rerum
