= Family history (disambiguation) =

Family history is the recording of the history of families.

Family history may also refer to:

- Family history (medicine), information about disorders from which the direct blood relatives of the patient have suffered
- Family History (2006 film), a Canadian drama film directed by Michel Poulette
- Family History (2019 film), a Philippine drama film directed by Michael V.
- "Family History", an episode of St. Elsewhere

== See also ==
- History of the family, a branch of social history that concerns the sociocultural evolution of kinship groups
