= Barbara Klich-Kluczewska =

Polish historian (born 1974)

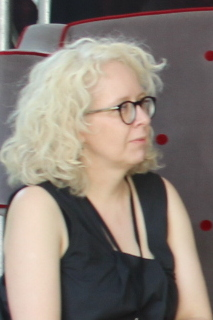
- Barbara Klich-Kluczewska during the Literary Heights Festival, 2026
- Born: 1974 (age 51–52)
- Occupation: Historian
- Board member of: PTH

Academic background
- Education: Jagiellonian University
- Thesis: Życie prywatne w Krakowie 1945–1989 (2004)
- Doctoral advisor: Andrzej Chwalba

Academic work
- Discipline: History
- Sub-discipline: Microhistory
- Main interests: Biopolitics; childhood; family; gender; sexuality; women
- Website: Barbara Klich-Kluczewska publications on Academia.edu

Barbara Klich-Kluczewska (born 1974) is a historian, professor at the Jagiellonian University.

== Biography ==
In 1998 she graduated in history from Jagiellonian University. In 2004 she obtained doctorate upon dissertation Życie prywatne w Krakowie 1945–1989 supervised by Andrzej Chwalba. In 2018 she obtained habilitation. She was a visiting professor at Rochester University (2009) and Universitat Martin Luther Halle (2018). In 2019 she held Research Fellowship for Advanced Scholars at the Imre Kertesz Kolleg Jena.

She is a member of the Committee on Historical Sciences of the Polish Academy of Sciences (2020–2023, 2024–2027), the board of the Kraków Branch of the Polish Historical Society, and the scientific council of the Hannah-Arendt-Institut für Totalitarismusforschung (HAIT) in Dresden.

She started work at the Department of Historical Anthropology at the Institute of History of Jagiellonian University. Her research interests include history of Polish post-war society from a cultural perspective, particularly the history of family and private life, the history of women and gender, the history of sexuality, the history of childhood, and biopolitics in Central and Eastern Europe. She employs a microhistorical perspective.

== Works ==
- Przez dziurkę od klucza. Życie prywatne w Krakowie (1945–1989). Warszawa: Wydawnictwo Trio. 2005.
- Rodzina, tabu i komunizm w Polsce, 1956–1989. Kraków: Wydawnictwo Libron. 2015.
- Gołębnik. Historia miejsca. Kraków: Księgarnia Akademicka. 2018.
- Kobiety w Polsce, 1945–1989. Nowoczesność – emancypacja – komunizm. Universitas. 2020. Co-authored with Małgorzata Fidelis, Piotr Perkowski and Katarzyna Stańczak-Wiślicz.
- Taboo, Family and Communism in Poland, 1956–1989. Peter Lang. 2021.

=== Editions ===
- Między sierpniem a grudniem. Solidarność w Krakowie i Małopolsce w latach 1980-1981. Kraków. 2006. Co-edited with Tomasz Gąsowski and Janusz Mierzwa.
- From mentalités to anthropological history. Theory and methods. Kraków: Historia Iagiellonica. 2012. Co-edited with Dobrochna Kałwa.
- Pytać mądrze. Studia z dziejów społecznych i kulturowych. Księga pamiątkowa dedykowana Profesorowi Andrzejowi Chwalbie. Historia Iagellonica. 2020. ISBN 978-83-66304-34-5. Co-edited with Anna Czocher.
- Biopolitics in Central and Eastern Europe in the 20th Century. Routledge. 2023. Co-edited with Immo Rebitschek and Joachim von Puttkamer.
