= Social organization =

Pattern of relationships between and among individuals and social groups

In sociology, a social organization is a pattern of relationships between and among individuals and groups. Characteristics of social organization can include qualities such as sexual composition, spatiotemporal cohesion, leadership, structure, division of labor, communication systems, and so on.

Because of these characteristics of social organization, people can monitor their everyday work and involvement in other activities that are controlled forms of human interaction. These interactions include: affiliation, collective resources, substitutability of individuals and recorded control. These interactions come together to constitute common features in basic social units such as family, enterprises, clubs, states, etc. These are social organizations.

Common examples of modern social organizations are government agencies, NGOs, and corporations.

== Elements ==
Social organizations are present in everyday life. Many people belong to various social structures, both institutional and informal. These include clubs, professional organizations, and religious institutions. Physical proximity with other members can strengthen a sense of community and shared identity within a social organization. While organizations link people with shared interests or goals, membership can also produce boundaries between members and non-members. Social organizations typically have some hierarchical structure. The form that hierarchy takes influences how a group is structured and how stable it tends to be over time.

Four other interactions can also bear on whether a group stays together. A group must have a strong affiliation within itself. To be affiliated with an organization means having a recognized connection and acceptance within that group, along with an obligation to return to it. The organization draws power through the collective resources of its affiliates. Those affiliates often have something invested in those resources, which motivates continued participation. At the same time, the organization must account for the substitutability of individuals: it needs affiliates and their resources to survive, but it also needs to be able to replace departing members. Given all these dynamics, internal coordination can be difficult. Recorded control — writing things down — makes processes clearer and keeps the organization coherent.

== Within society ==
Social organizations within society change over time. Smaller-scale social organizations include groups that form from common interests and conversations.

These small organizations — bands, clubs, sports teams — have the same structural characteristics as large-scale organizations, even if their membership is far smaller. They still interact and function in similar ways.

A school sports team is a clear example. Members share a common goal and work together toward it. Different roles or positions divide the labor. The structure, while informal, is real: there are coaches, captains, and players, each with distinct responsibilities.

Large-scale organizations typically involve some degree of bureaucracy: a set of rules, specializations, and a hierarchical system, which allows them to pursue efficiency at scale. These organizations tend to rely on impersonal authority, where the position of power is structurally defined and kept separate from personal relationships, so that operations run predictably regardless of who holds a given role.

A hospital is one example of a large social organization. Within the hospital's overarching social structure we sometimes find smaller social structures such as within the nursing staff, the surgery team, facilities and operations teams. These smaller social structures work closely together on specific-to-their-role tasks. As a large social organization, a hospital may daily demonstrate relationships among staff and with patients, as well as the division of labor, structure, cohesion, and communication systems. This example serves to demonstrate how these smaller networks and structures serve to facilitate the larger structure's operations and objective. A 2023 study on the collaborative and professional boundary challenges within a hospital ward found that, "To safely discharge patients, the professionals needed

to talk about each other’s professional responsibilities" (Bjork,M., 2024, p.389). In other words, the social structure necessary for patient health relies on multiple networks.

Whether bureaucracy and hierarchical management are effective also depends on the structure of work within the organization. Organizations where departments operate independently of one another — called parallel organizations — do not necessarily benefit from top-down hierarchical control, because the diversity of functions makes centralized coordination difficult. Interdependent organizations, where departments rely on each other to complete tasks, tend to be better suited to hierarchical management because the work requires coordination across the whole.

== Collectivism and individualism ==
Societies can be organized through individualistic or collectivist means. Each orientation has documented associations with different patterns in economic behavior, legal and political institutions, and social relations. The organization of a society is shaped by its cultural, historical, social, political, and economic context, which in turn governs how members interact.

Collectivist or individualist orientations can exist within a single broader society. Studies have examined differences in collectivism between regions of the US and between regions of China. Researchers have also examined historical factors linked to these differences, such as histories of rice and wheat farming in different regions of China and patterns of frontier settlement in the western United States.

=== Collectivism ===
Some scholars argue that the core unit of collectivism is the group. Others argue that "group" is too broad and that the focus is specific, close relationships. Individuals are seen as fundamentally connected through relationships and group membership. In this context, groups are defined as networks of interpersonal relationships. The collectivist orientation places emphasis on collective identity and collective agency, and values tend to prioritize the group over the individual.

However, common misunderstandings of collectivism are that it entails trust, warmth, and a rejection of competition. Studies have found that people in collectivistic cultures endorse competition more than people in individualistic cultures. Other research has found that people in collectivistic cultures are more mistrusting of people in their social circles (sometimes called "frienemies"). This can happen because collectivism involves strong ties between people, often with less freedom to choose relationships and leave conflictual relationships.

Some researchers measure collectivism through behaviors such as living arrangements, rates of multi-generational households, and divorce rates. Psychologically, collectivism is associated with what researchers call "holistic thought," which attends to relationships between objects, context, and a broader range of information simultaneously. And studies have found that getting people to think about social relationships in laboratory experiments makes people think more holistically.

Collectivist social organization may be horizontal or vertical. Horizontal models stress relationships within communities rather than a social hierarchy between them.

This kind of system has been associated with cultures with strong religious, ethnic, or familial group ties.

=== Individualism ===
An individualist orientation places emphasis on the individual through self-identity, individual agency, and values that tend to prioritize the individual over the collective. Psychologically, individualist orientations are associated with a tendency to distinguish, separate, and contrast information rather than integrate or assimilate it. Individualist social organization has been linked to different institutional forms, including arrangements that prioritize personal autonomy, contract-based cooperation, and formal legal structures for coordinating behavior between people who do not share strong group ties. However, individualism has also been associated with rising loneliness & isolation.

=== Regional Associations ===
Most research on individualism has been conducted in the United States, Germany, and the Netherlands. Most research on collectivism has come from East Asia.

European data has drawn predominantly from Germany and the Netherlands. Scandinavian countries (which have a more egalitarian culture), southern Europe, and Eastern Europe are underrepresented in this data. Africa, West Asia, and Latin American countries are also absent from much of the research. The literature does not substantially cover countries with Islamic culture or countries experiencing within-group conflict.

== Online ==
Social organizations can exist in digital spaces, and online communities show patterns of interaction similar to those in in-person social groups. The technology allows people to engage with social organizations without being in the same physical location.

Although the characteristics of online organizations differ in some ways from those of in-person groups, the structural parallels are clear. Various forms of online communication allow people to talk, share interests, and maintain membership in a group without physical presence. These online groups still function as social organizations because of the relationships within them and the shared interest in sustaining the community.

== See also ==
- Allocentrism – Personality attribute centering attention on others
- Communitarianism – Philosophy emphasizing community
- Cooperation – Groups working or acting together
- Corporation – Legal entity incorporated through a legislative or registration process
- Government agency – Organization distinguished by its role in public administration
- Institution – Structure or mechanism of social order
  - Total institution – Place where a lot of people (in the same condition) live together, cut off from society
- Organization – Social entity established to meet needs or pursue goals
- Postliberalism – Political philosophy
- Social group – Two or more humans who interact with one another
- Social network – Social structure made up of a set of social actors
- Social structure – Aggregate of patterned social arrangements in society
