= Hypomnema =

Greek word

Hypomnema (Greek. ὑπόμνημα, plural ὑπομνήματα, hypomnemata), also spelled hupomnema, is a Greek word with several translations into English including a reminder, a note, a public record, a commentary, an anecdotal record, a draft, a copy, and other variations on those terms.

Plato's theory of anamnesis recognized the new status of writing as a device of artificial memory, and he developed the hypomnesic principles for his students to follow in the Academy. According to Michel Foucault, "The hypomnemata constituted a material memory of things read, heard, or thought, thus offering these as an accumulated treasure for rereading and later meditation. They also formed a raw material for the writing of more systematic treatises in which were given arguments and means by which to struggle against some defect (such as anger, envy, gossip, flattery) or to overcome some difficult circumstance (a mourning, an exile, downfall, disgrace)."

== Modern usage ==
Michel Foucault uses the word in the sense of "note", but his translators use the word "notebook", which is anachronistic (see codex and wax tablet). Concerning Seneca's discipline of self-knowledge, Foucault writes: "In this period there was a culture of what could be called personal writing: taking notes on the reading, conversations, and reflections that one hears or engages in oneself; keeping kinds of notebooks on important subjects (what the Greeks call 'hupomnemata'), which must be reread from time to time so as to reactualize their contents." In an excerpt from an Interview with Michel Foucault in The Foucault Reader^{Broken link}, he says: "As personal as they were, the hypomnemata must nevertheless not be taken for intimate diaries or for those accounts of spiritual experience (temptations, struggles, falls, and victories) which can be found in later Christian literature. [... T]heir objective is not to bring the arcana conscientiae to light, the confession of which—be it oral or written—has a purifying value."

== See also ==
- Commonplace book
- Commentarii
- Memex
- Mnemonic
- Silva rerum
