= Władysław Rydzewski =

Władysław Rydzewski (9 July 1911 - 28 August 1980) was a Polish professor of zoology who specialized in ornithology and founded the journal The Ring in 1954. Władysław Rydzewski Museum of Natural History in Wroclaw was named in his honour.

== Biography ==
Władysław was born in Kraków, the son of geologist Bronisław Rydzewski and Maria. After studying at the Warsaw Gymnasium he went to study at the University of Warsaw under Professor Konstanty Janicki (1876-1932) and Jan Tur. He joined the Nature Conservation League in 1930. In 1933 he joined military service and went to the Artillery Reserve Officer School in Volhynia. In 1937 he submitted his master's thesis and then visited ornithological research stations at Rēzekne, Riga and Tartu. From 1938 he edited the newsletter of the bird research station of the State Museum of Zoology but was interrupted by World War II. He joined the 3rd Light Artillery Regiment in August 1939 and found during the September campaign during which he was wounded and briefly held prisoner. In 1940 he was in charge of the Zoological Museum but he also took part in the underground resistance under the nickname of "Bogdan" and "Niemen". He was fired from his work and during the Warsaw Uprising he served as commander of the 1st Platoon 6 battalion Zaremba-Piorun of the Home Army. He was wounded and later awarded the Cross of the Order of the Virtuti Militari.

After the war, he joined the Polish army but was sent to Italy as he had a lung infection. He was later posted in Egypt and Lebanon. In 1947 he moved to the United Kingdom and for two years he served as a volunteer in the ornithology department of the British Museum. He worked in Croydon at a plastic factory and later a radio engineering company. He also studied at the Imperial College in London and wrote a dissertation on "The nomadic movements and migrations of the European Common Heron, Ardea cinerea L." for which he received a Ph.D. in 1954. He attended the ornithological congress at Uppsala in 1951, presenting a history of bird ringing. In 1954 he presented on "The History of Birdwatching". In 1959 he became a lecturer and spent about five month in the Canary Islands studying migration with American ornithologists. He was offered a professorship in the United States but he refused it in favour of an invitation from Poland and returned there in December 1960. He became an associate professor at the University of Wroclaw and later became a head of the department of comparative zoology. He then established an ornithology department and headed it until 1969. In 1963 he organized the EURING, a collaboration of European ornithologists studying bird migration.

Rydzewski founded and edited The Ring in 1954, publishing it from Croydon for the first six years and then from Wroclaw until his death in 1980. He also served as editor (1962-1973) of Acta Ornithologica published by the Polish Academy of Sciences in Warsaw.
