= Jerzy Stanisław Janicki =

Polish physicist

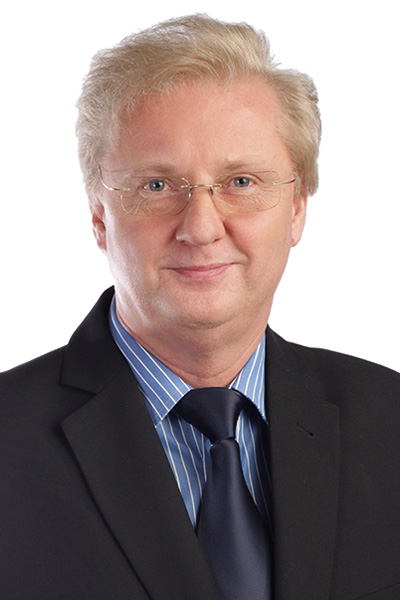
Jerzy Stanisław Janicki

Jerzy Stanisław Janicki (born 4 May 1956 in Piła, Poland), Ph.D. in physical sciences, member of the scientific and educational staff of the Physics Institute at Adam Mickiewicz University in Poznań (1980–1993).

== Education and scientific activities ==
Graduated from The Faculty of Mathematics and Physics at Adam Mickiewicz University in Poznań in 1980 specialising in – Experimental Physics. Since 1980 he worked in the Physics Institute AMU at the position of assistant. In 1994 he defended his Ph.D. in nuclear physics.

Since 1991 he has been the director of The Institute for Physico-Medical Research, which he created under Primax Medic Research, Innovative and Development Company Ltd. The focus of the activities of the Institute is the development and implementation of new technologies in medicine.

He is the author of numerous publications and scientific reports in nuclear physics, spectroscopy and magnetic properties of solids. The results of his research he has presented at many scientific conferences in Poland and abroad.

He is the author of single fibre based heart activity model (SFHAM) describing the electrical activity of myocardium used in SATRO-ECG method (protected by patent law P-372687) facilitating non-invasive cardiac diagnosis, including early detection of coronary heart disease. He also developed a unique distribution of inhomogeneous static magnetic field, which is used in magnetic products Energy For Life and MagneTouch.

=== Selected author's publications ===
- Janicki J. Physical Basis of Satro – A New Method For Analysis of The Cardiac Muscle Depolarisation. Los Alamos National Laboratory, p. 1-43, 2006, arXiv:physics/0602162v2 [physics.med-ph]
- Janicki J. Physical foundations of the SATRO method. PIW Primax Medic, p. 1-71, 2006, LCCN 2006356427; ISBN 83-60007-10-1
- Janicki J. Wpływ gradientowego pola magnetycznego na organizm człowieka. Acta Bio-Optica et Informatica Medica 4/2008, vol. 14, p. 300-301
- Janicki JS. Podstawy zastosowania gradientowego pola magnetycznego w rehabilitacji. Rehabilitacja w praktyce, 1/2009, p. 15
- Janicki JS. Gradientowe pole magnetyczne w medycynie. Acta Bio-Optica et Informatica Medica 2/2009, vol. 15, p. 127-128

=== Selected joint publications ===
- Janicki J, Pietrzak J, Porębska A, Suwalski J. Mössbauer Study of Copper Ferrites. Phys. Stat. Sol. (a) 72, 95, 1982
- Janicki J, Januszczyk M, Krzyminiewski R, Pietrzak J, Suwalski J, Śledzińska I. Mössbauer Effect Investigation of one dimensional crystal. Acta Phys. Polon. A68, 69, 1985
- Janicki J, Maryanowska A, Pietrzak J, Suwalski J. Mössbauer Study of the Ferromagnetically Ordered Perovskite Sr_{2}FeVO_{6}. Acta Phys. Polon. A68, 425, 1985
- Janicki J, Januszczyk M, Pietrzak J, Mydlarz T. Magnetic susceptibilities of the one - dimensional Fe(py)_{3} Cl_{3} py single crystal. Acta Phys. Polon A72, 311, 1987
- Janicki J, Onyszkiewicz I, Suwalski J. Mössbauer Study of the structural Phase Transition in Cu-Ferrite doped with small Quantity of C_{d}^{+2} ions. Acta Phys. Polon. A72, 315, 1987
- Januszczyk M, Janicki J, Wojakowska H, Krzyminiewski R, Pietrzak J. Synthesis and Mössbauer effect studies of low dimensional organoiron compound. Inorganica Chimica Acta 186, 27, 1991
- Januszczyk M, Kruczyński Z, Janicki J, Pietrzak J. EPR and Mössbauer Studies of Fe(py)_{3}Cl_{3} py Sing. J. Phys. Chem. Solids, 56(6) 819-823, 1995
- Portalska H, Janicki J. Ocena wpływu muzyki na funkcje fizjologiczne organizmu z wykorzystaniem aparatury Folla nowej generacji. Fizjoterapia 4/4 28, 1996
- Janicki JS. Zastosowanie stałego pola magnetycznego w terapii. PIW Primax Medic, Poznań 2009, p. 1-102, ISBN 978-83-60007-30-3
- Janicki JS, Leoński W, Jagielski J. Partial potentials of selected cardiac muscle regions and heart activity model based on single fibres. Medical Engineering & Physics, 31 (2009) 1276-1282
- Janicki JS, Leoński W, Jagielski J, Sobieszczańska M, Chąpiński M, Janicki Ł. Single Fibre Based Heart Activity Model (SFHAM) Based Qrs-Waves Synthesis. W: Sobieszczańska M, Jagielski J, Macfarlane PW, editors. Electrocardiology 2009. JAKS Publishing Company; 2010. p. 81-86, ISBN 978-83-928209-5-6
- Janicki JS, Leoński W, Jagielski J, Sobieszczańska M, Leońska JG. Implementation of SFHAM in Coronary Heart Disease Diagnosis. W: Sobieszczańska M, Jagielski J, Macfarlane PW, editors. Electrocardiology 2009. JAKS Publishing Company; 2010. p. 197-201, ISBN 978-83-928209-5-6

=== Post-conference publications ===
- Janicki J, Pietrzak J, Suwalski J. Mössbauer Study of Copper Ferrites. Proc. Intern. Conf. on Physics of Magnetic Materiale, Jaszowiec 1980
- Janicki J, Januszczyk M, Pietrzak J, Suwalski J. Badanie kryształów Fe(py)_{3} Cl_{3} py metodą γ-spektroskopii. Materiały Ogólnopolskiej Konferencji - Kryształy Molekularne 83, Kraków 1983
- Janicki J, Januszczyk M, Pietrzak J, Suwalski J. Mössbauer Effect measurements in the low dimensional system Fe(py)_{3} Cl_{3} py. Proc. Inter. Conf. Trends in Physics, Praga 1984
- Janicki J, Januszczyk M, Krzyminiewski R, Pietrzak J, Suwalski J. Mössbauer Effect Investigation of one dimensional crystal. Proc. Inter. Conf. on Phys. of Magnetic Materials, Jadwisin 1984
- Janicki J, Maryanowska A, Pietrzak J, Suwalski J. Mössbauer Study of The Ferromagnetic Ordered Perovskite Sr_{2}FeVO_{6}. Proc. Inter. Conf. on Phys. of Magnetic Materials, Jadwisin 1984
- Januszczyk M, Pietrzak J, Janicki J. Wpływ defektów na przewodnictwo elektryczne w quasi- jednowymiarowym kompleksie Fe(py)_{3} Cl_{3} py. Materiały Ogólnopolskiej Konferencji – Zjazd Fizyków, Gdańsk 1984
- Janicki J, Pietrzak J. Mössbauer Investigation of The Antiferromagnetic. Proc. Inter. Conf. on Mössbauer Discussion Group Meeting, University of East England 1985
- Janicki J, Januszczyk M, Pietrzak J, Mydlarz T. Przejścia fazowe w niskowymiarowym monokrysztale Fe(py)_{3} Cl_{3} py. Materiały Ogólnopolskiej Konferencji - Kryształy Molekularne 85, Warszawa 1985
- Janicki J, Januszczyk M, Pietrzak J, Mydlarz T. Magnetic susceptibilities of the one - dimensional single crystal. Proc. Inter. Conf. on Phys. of Magnetic Materials, Szczyrk-Biła 1986
- Janicki J, Onyszkiewicz I, Suwalski J. Mössbauer Study of the structural Phase Transition in Cu-Ferrite doped with small Quantity of C_{d}^{+2} ions. Proc. Inter. Conf. on Phys. of Magnetic Materials, Szczyrk-Biła 1986
- Januszczyk M, Latosińska JN, Janicki J, Szyczewski A, Krzyminiewski R, Pietrzak J. Application of ^{57}Fe Mössbauer Effect to the Studies of TCP-P Single Crystals. 18th Conference on Modern Magnetic Resonances, RAMIS’99, April 11–15. p. 43, 1999
- Januszczyk M, Latosińska JN, Janicki J, Szyczewski A, Krzyminiewski R, Pietrzak J. ^{57}Fe Mössbauer Studies of TCPF-P Single Crystal, XV International Symposium on NQR, July 25–30, p. 25, Leipzig 1999, Germany
- Janicki JS. Analiza EKG z uwzględnieniem procesów fizycznych zachodzących w mięśniu sercowym. VI International Society for Holter & Noninvasive Electrocardiology, Zakopane Kościelisko 2004
- Janicki JS. Physical basis of SATRO - a new method for analysis of the cardiac muscle depolarisation. 33rd International Congress on Electrocardiology, Cologne 2006, Germany
- Janicki JS, Jagielski JK, Sobieszczańska M, Rusiecki L, Chąpiński MK, Janicki ŁJ. SATRO - a New Method of Examining the Cardioelectric Field. 35th International Congress on Electrocardiology, St. Petersburg 2008, Russia
- Janicki JS, Chąpiński MK, Janicki ŁJ, Janicki MB. SATRO – a breakthrough in early heart diagnosis. World’s Best Technologies Showcase 2008, Arlington 2008, USA
- Janicki JS, Leoński W, Jagielski J, Sobieszczańska M, Chąpiński M, Janicki Ł. Single Fibre Based Heart Activity Model (SFHAM) Based Qrs-Waves Synthesis. 36th International Congress on Elektrocardiology, Wrocław 2009.
- Janicki JS, Leoński W, Jagielski J, Sobieszczańska M, Leońska JG. Implementation of SFHAM in Coronary Heart Disease Diagnosis. 36th International Congress on Elektrocardiology, Wroclaw 2009.

== Business and social activities ==
In 1991 he established and became the chairman of Primax Medic Research, Innovative and Development Company Ltd. The company deals with implementation for commercial use the solutions developed in The Institute for Physico-Medical Research Development. With him as the leader the company achieved many successes:

- National Leader of Innovation 2009
- Innovation 2009 for the author's SATRO system on International Congress on Electrocardiology (ICE 2009)
- Joining Polish Chamber of Commerce for High Technology
- Participation in the conference World's Best Technologies Showcase in 2008
- Participation in the project “Innovation for Public Health” reported to the United Nations under the title “Program of Universal Prevention and Therapy of Coronary Heart Disease (CHD)”

Running the company, he implements the policies of social responsibility of businesses. Moreover, he also participates in the initiative of the UN Secretary General under the name United Nations Global Compact. In his activities he supports scientific and cultural events, e.g.: he physics contest organised by Polish Physical Society, film festival “Integration You and Me” in Koszalin, Chopin Festival in Small Philharmonic Hall in Puszczykowo.

== Prizes and awards ==
In 2004 he received the title of Doctor Honoris Causa at the Department of Medical Science of the Open International University in Colombo, implementing the objectives of World Health Organization (WHO) under the program "Health for All".

He was nominated to stand for the prestigious Kavli Prize for the year 2010 in Neuroscience (Reference No.: 9444828).

He is the second Pole in the history of International Association of Educators for World Peace nominated by this organization to the Nobel Peace Prize in 2010.

== Sources ==
Jerzy Stanisław Janicki in the portal nauka-polska.pl
