= Rydzewski =

Rydzewski (feminine: Rydzewska) is a Polish surname. Notable people with the surname include:

- Frank Rydzewski (1892–1979), American football player
- Władysław Rydzewski (1911–1980), Polish ornithologist
