= Swipe file =

Template used in marketing and copywriting

A swipe file is a collection of tested and proven advertising and sales letters. Keeping a swipe file is a common practice used by advertising copywriters and creative directors as a reference of ideas for projects.

Authors and publishers can benefit from creating a swipe file of best-selling titles to give them ideas for their own titles. Publicists can create a swipe file of great press release headlines. Copywriters also need to keep a swipe file ad copies for future inspiration.

Swipe files are also commonly used by Internet marketers who need to gather a lot of resources not only about products but also about marketing methods and strategies.

== See also ==
- Commonplace book
- Communication design
- Internet marketing
- Morgue file
- Search engine optimization
