= Family cookbooks =

Books which contain a variety of recipes collected by specific families

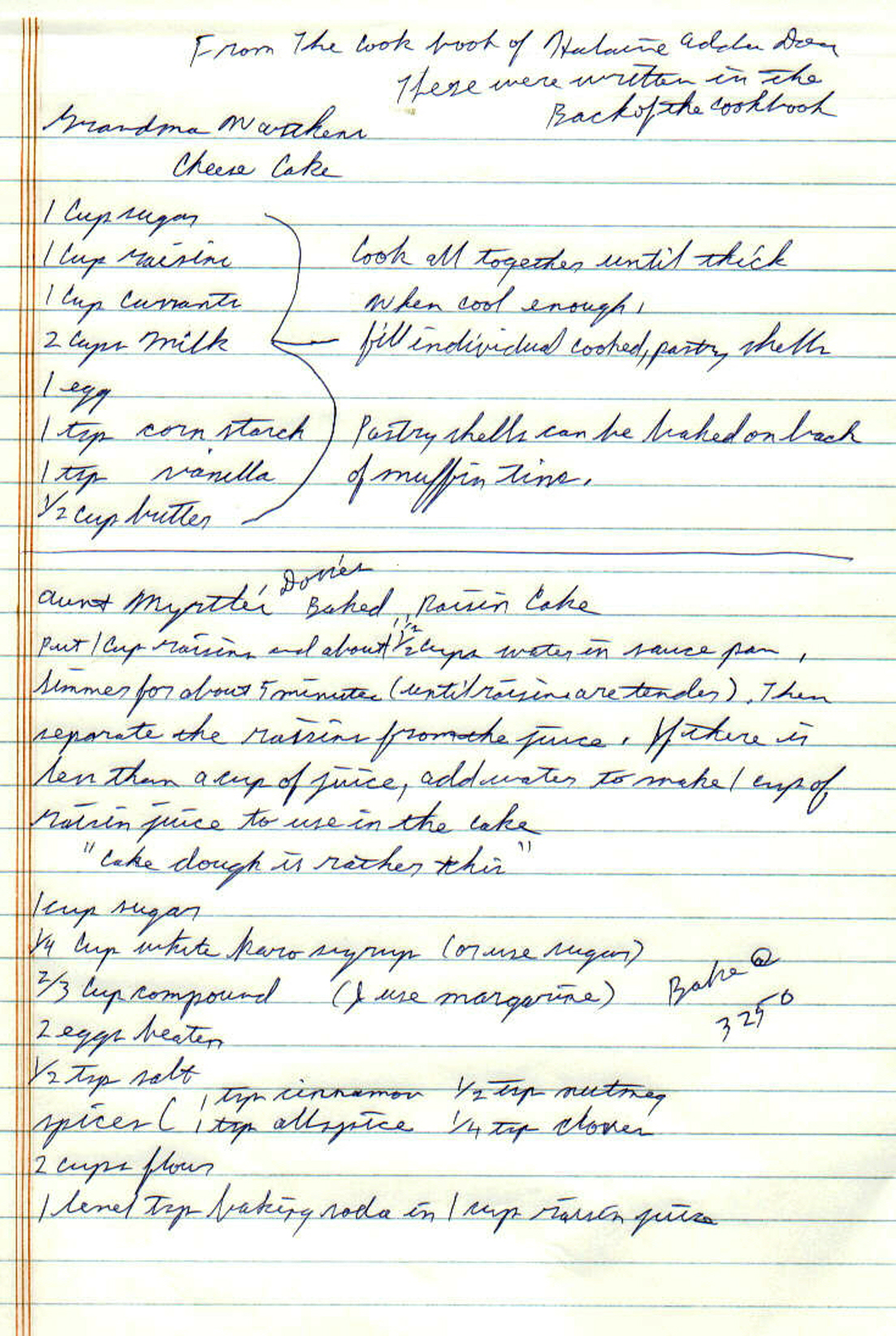
Cheesecake recipe from a family cookbook

Family cookbooks are books which contain a variety of recipes collected by specific families. Whilst these cookbooks are sometimes later published, the concept is of a commonplace book where useful recipes are retained and passed on to later generations.

The recipes can be developed by the family or collated from other sources – and may be so familiar to the family that the origin is forgotten or not acknowledged.

== Family cookbooks as memory ==
Whilst the primary function of a family cookbook is as a scrapbook to collect recipes for various types of meals and cooking techniques, an important function is also to provide context and promote familial memory.

Scholars use these kinds of collected manuscripts to give insights into family history in the era when they were written, such as about gender roles, household environments, and women's emancipation.

== Commercial family cookbooks ==
Celebrities, chefs, and notable families write and market family cookbooks which share their family recipes.

== Western History ==
The earliest family cookbook on the western side of the world dates back to 1700 BC in Mesopotamia, a cookbook was constructed of four clay tablets. Although the first ever traditional cookbook can be dated back to 1300s on the eastern side of the world where it was seen as a privilege for royalty and nobles.

== See also ==
- Family traditions
