= Family traditions =

Aggregate of traditions

Family tradition, also called family culture, is defined as an aggregate of attitudes, ideas and ideals, and environment, which a person inherits from their parents and ancestors.

== Modern studies of family traditions ==
The study of family tradition and personality has attracted the attention of social scientists. Ernest W. Burgess, Professor of Sociology at the University of Chicago, has defined the term in these words:

Whatever its biological inheritance from its parents and other ancestors, the child receives also from them a heritage of attitudes, sentiments, and ideals which may be termed the family tradition, or the family culture.

Sometimes, family traditions are associated with practices and beliefs which are handed over from one generation to the next, and during this process of transmission they acquire an aura of spirituality. Transmission of any set of such family traditions, acquiring spiritual significance, is largely an intuitive phenomenon, and the flow of family traditions continue without any intention, and the same continue to move on from one generation to another. Family traditions for most families remain largely confined to family members, but sometimes, outsiders may also be associated with a particular family's family traditions.

== Functioning of family traditions ==
Halbwachs in his book "On Collective Meare revealed only to its members. But these memories, as in the religious traditions of the family of antiquity, consist not only of a series of individual images of the past. They are at the same time models, examples, and elements of teaching. They express the general attitude of the group; they not only reproduce its history but also define its nature and its qualities and weaknesses".

Maintaining family traditions, such as preparing particular foods for holidays, is a form of emotional labor called kinkeeping.

== Antiquity of family traditions ==
Family traditions have their roots in distant past, to pre-historic times, when the concept and system of family as a unit of society was crystallized. In all ages and in all civilizations, since the ancient time to the present day, families have taken pride in their traditions. Before nuclear family systems became the order of the day, there used to be joint family system, consisting of all the family members of two or even three generations, living together.

Then, as also now, several families like to identify a particular person as the keeper of the family traditions and assign a particular name to the keeper. Thus, a particular family, residing in the modern United Kingdom may assign a catchy name like "Keeper of the Flame" to the identified family member, entrusted with the responsibility of ensuring observance of that particular family’s family traditions. On the other side of the globe, in a country like India, the society has assigned a common nomenclature for the head of a Hindu Undivided Family (HUF), a form of joint family. Head of such a family is called "Karta" (literal meaning ‘One who does’), and for all practical purposes, "Karta" was entrusted with responsibilities, among other things, to ensure observance of family traditions. Even, modern India's legal system recognizes the concept of "Karta" as the head of a Hindu joint family.

== Classic examples of family traditions ==
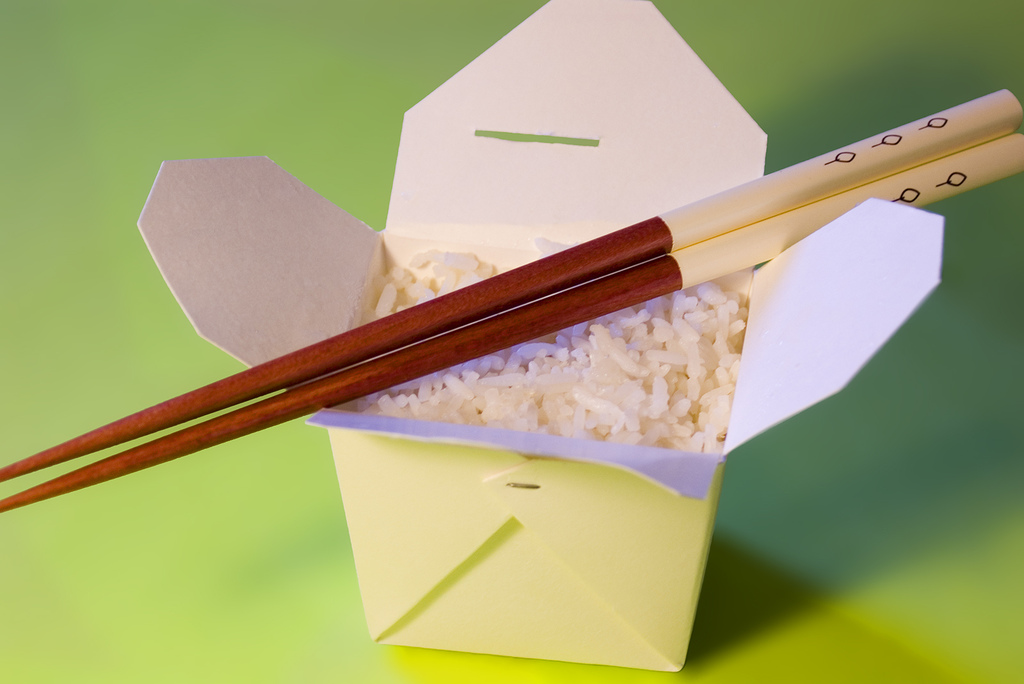
Many families have a tradition of eating a particular food on holidays. For example, some Jewish families in the US eat Chinese food on Christmas Day.

One of the classic examples of family traditions of the modern era is the family traditions of the present royal family of Great Britain. One of such family traditions enjoin upon male members of the present British royal family to serve in the armed forces. A BBC report has announced on 12 June 2003 that "Prince Harry’s decision to join the Army means he will follow a long family tradition of serving the military." Before him, his uncle, Prince Andrew, had joined the Navy in 1979. Prince Harry’s other uncle, Prince Edward had joined the Royal Marines as a second lieutenant in 1983. Prince Harry’s father, Charles III, was appointed in 1969 as colonel-in-chief of the Royal Regiment of Wales. Harry’s grandfather, Prince Philip, Duke of Edinburgh, had joined the Navy in 1939, and had also served in the World War II.

Many families have traditions around celebrating holidays, such as with particular foods or activities.

== Family traditions in the modern context ==
Meaningful family traditions have always been a valuable tool for parents and elders to carry out the responsibility of raising children and inculcating into them social values and ethos. Family traditions ensure that the warmth and closeness of family bondage grow. In the modern context, maintenance of and developing family traditions continue to be as significant as they were at the earliest times. Active family traditions and meaningful participation in them help families to avoid social entropy. In physical science, the term entropy means the tendency of the physical system to lose energy and coherence over a period of time, like a gas dissipating until it is all but gone. An "entropic family" is one that loses its sense of emotional closeness because members neglect the family’s inner life and community ties.

Social scientists now agree that effective family traditions promote a sense of identity and a feeling of closeness, a sense of security and assurance in today’s fast, hectic, and ever-changing world. William Doherty, a social scientist has explained in his book "The Intentional Family" that as family bonds are weakened by busy lifestyles, families can stay connected only by being intentional about maintaining important rituals and traditions.

== See also ==
- Family cookbooks
- Silva rerum – Polish "home chronicles"
