= Andrzej Chwalba =

Polish historian

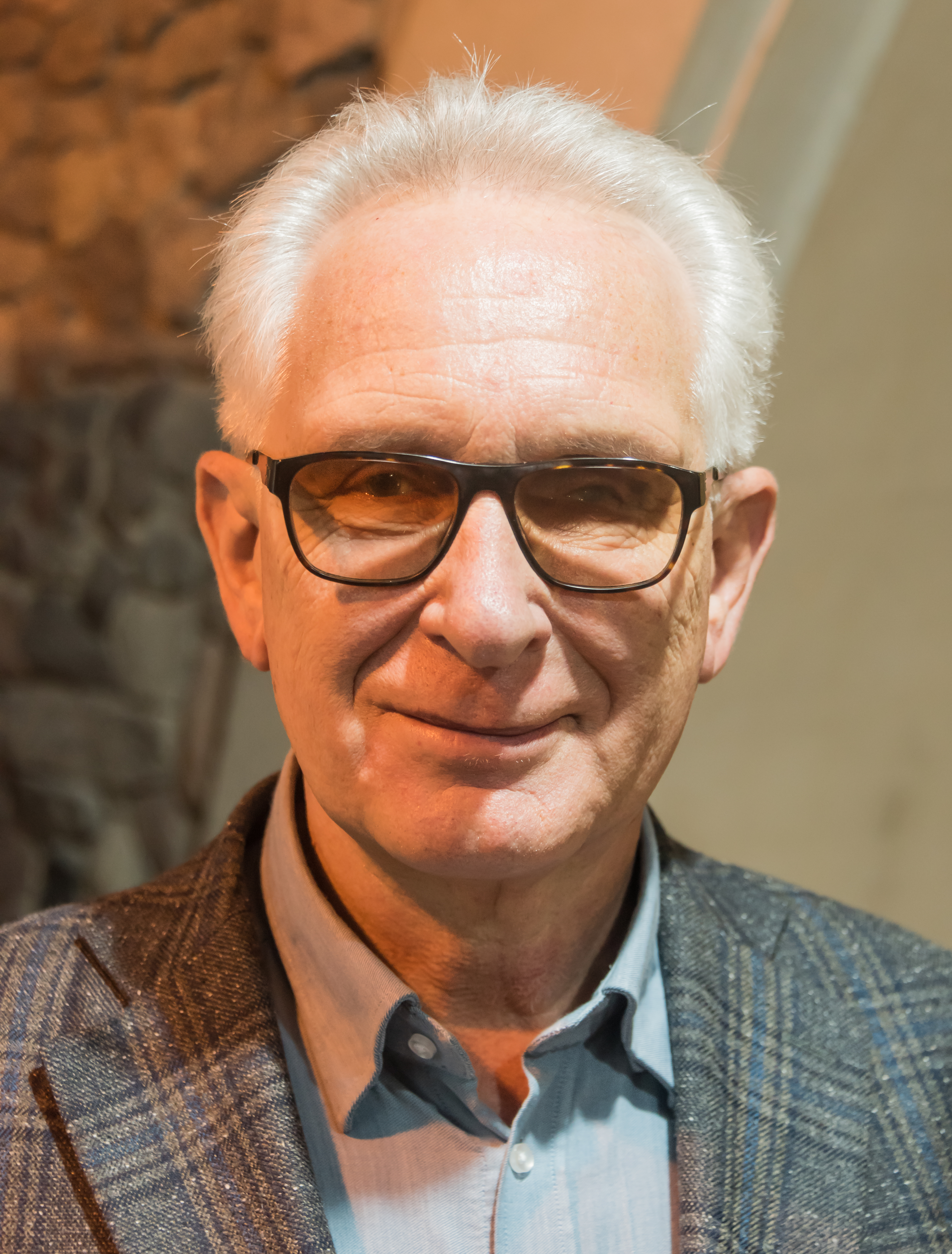
- Portrait of Chwalba during a bookfair at the Royal Castle, 2022
- Born: Andrzej Jerzy Chwalba; 1949 (age 76–77); Częstochowa, Kielce Voivodeship, Republic of Poland
- Occupation: Historian
- Political party: PZPR

Academic background
- Education: Jagiellonian University
- Thesis: (1982)

Academic work
- Discipline: History
- Sub-discipline: Modern history

Andrzej Chwalba (born 1949 in Częstochowa) is a Polish historian. A Professor of history at the Jagiellonian University (UJ) since 1995, the University's prorector of didactics (1999-2002), head of the Institute of Social and Religious History of Europe in the 19th and 20th centuries, and the deacon and prodeacon of the Department of History.

== Biography ==
Chwalba graduated from UJ in 1972. Later he worked as a teacher in Częstochowa. In 1977 he became a member of the Polish United Workers' Party. He gained a Ph.D. from UJ in 1982.

Chwalba is a member of the Polish Historical Society, the Historical Commission of the Polish Academy of Sciences and several foreign historical societies (Intern. Tagung der Historik, Europ. Community Liaison Committee of Historians, Centre de recherches d'histoire des mouvement sociaux et du syndicalisme), as well as editor in chief of Alternatywy (1985-1989); and Arka (1994-1995). He is a member of the editorial board of Historyka. He is also Chairman of the Organisational Committee of the Congress.

Works by Chwalba centre on the social and religious history of Europe in the 19th and 20th centuries. He has published over 120 scientific dissertations, including several books.

His doctoral students included Barbara Klich-Kluczewska; Kamil Janicki was also among his students.

In December 2002 he received Kraków Book of the Month Award for the book Dzieje Krakowa. Kraków w latach 1939–1945. He received Kraków Book of the Month Award again in December 2023 for Wisła. Biografia rzeki.

== Works ==
- Socjaliści polscy wobec kultu religijnego (1989)
- Sacrum i rewolucja (1992)
- Józef Piłsudski historyk wojskowości (1993)
- Imperium korupcji w Rosji i Królestwie Polskim w latach 1861–1917 (1995)
- Czasy "Solidarności". Francuscy związkowcy i NSZZ "S" 1980–90 (1997)
- Polacy w służbie Moskali (1999)
- Słownik Historii Polski 1939–1948 (1994,1996) - coauthor
- Kalendarium Dziejów Polski (1999) (editor)
- Samobójstwo Europy. Wielka Wojna 1914–1918 (2014)
- Przegrane zwycięstwo. Wojna polsko-bolszewicka 1918–1920 (2020)
- The Polish-Lithuanian Commonwealth. History, Memory, Legacy. New York-London: Routledge. 2021. Edited by, with Krzysztof Zamorski.
- Polska–Rosja. Historia obsesji, obsesja historii. 2021. With Wojciech Harpula.
- The People of Poland at War: 1914–1918. 2021. ISBN 978-3-631-83845-7.
- Der Krieg der anderen. Die Polen und der Erste Weltkrieg 1914–1918. 2021. ISBN 978-3-631-83128-1.
- Festung Krakau. Kraków w cieniu twierdzy. 2022. ISBN 978-83-08-07592-0.
- Cham i Pan. 2022. ISBN 978-83-08-07673-6. With Wojciech Harpula.
- Wisła. Biografia rzeki. 2023. ISBN 978-83-08-08126-6.
- Polska krwawi. Polska walczy. Jak żyło się pod okupacją 1939–1945. 2024. ISBN 978-83-08-08470-0.
- Maj 1926. Zamach, którego miało nie być. 2026. ISBN 978-83-8396-285-6.
