= Jan Tur =

Polish zoologist

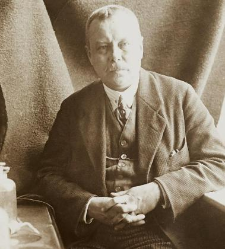

Jan Feliks Tur (25 August 1875 – 8 May 1942) was a Polish zoologist who specialized in embryology, mutagenesis, and teratology at the University of Warsaw. His family belonged to the Korczak clan of nobles.

Tur was born at Radziwiliszki near Grażun to landowner Jarosław Daniel and Maria née Rymkiewicz. After schooling in Vilnius and Częstochowa, he studied zoology at the Warsaw Imperial University under Pavel Mitrofanov and became his assistant in 1899. After receiving a doctorate from the Jagiellonian University on avian teratology under Józef Nusbaum-Hilarowicz he went on internships to Villefranche, Roscoff, Saratov, Vimereux and Heligoland. In 1912 he began a zoological laboratory in Warsaw and gave lectures in biology. From 1915 he was involved in the revival of the Polish University of Warsaw and became a lecturer in 1916. After his habilitation in 1918, he became a professor of comparative anatomy in 1919. His research was principally on abnormal development of the embryo (or teratology) and worked on cytology, embryology and comparative anatomy. He examined the effect of radiation from radium on organismic development and mutation, working with Marie Skłodowska-Curie whom he had met in Paris in 1902. He took an evolutionary approach to the interpretation of mutations and believed that some mutations could demonstrate primitive developmental states. He also took an interest in the history and philosophy of science.
