= Sammelband =

Book constructed from various separate works or manuscripts

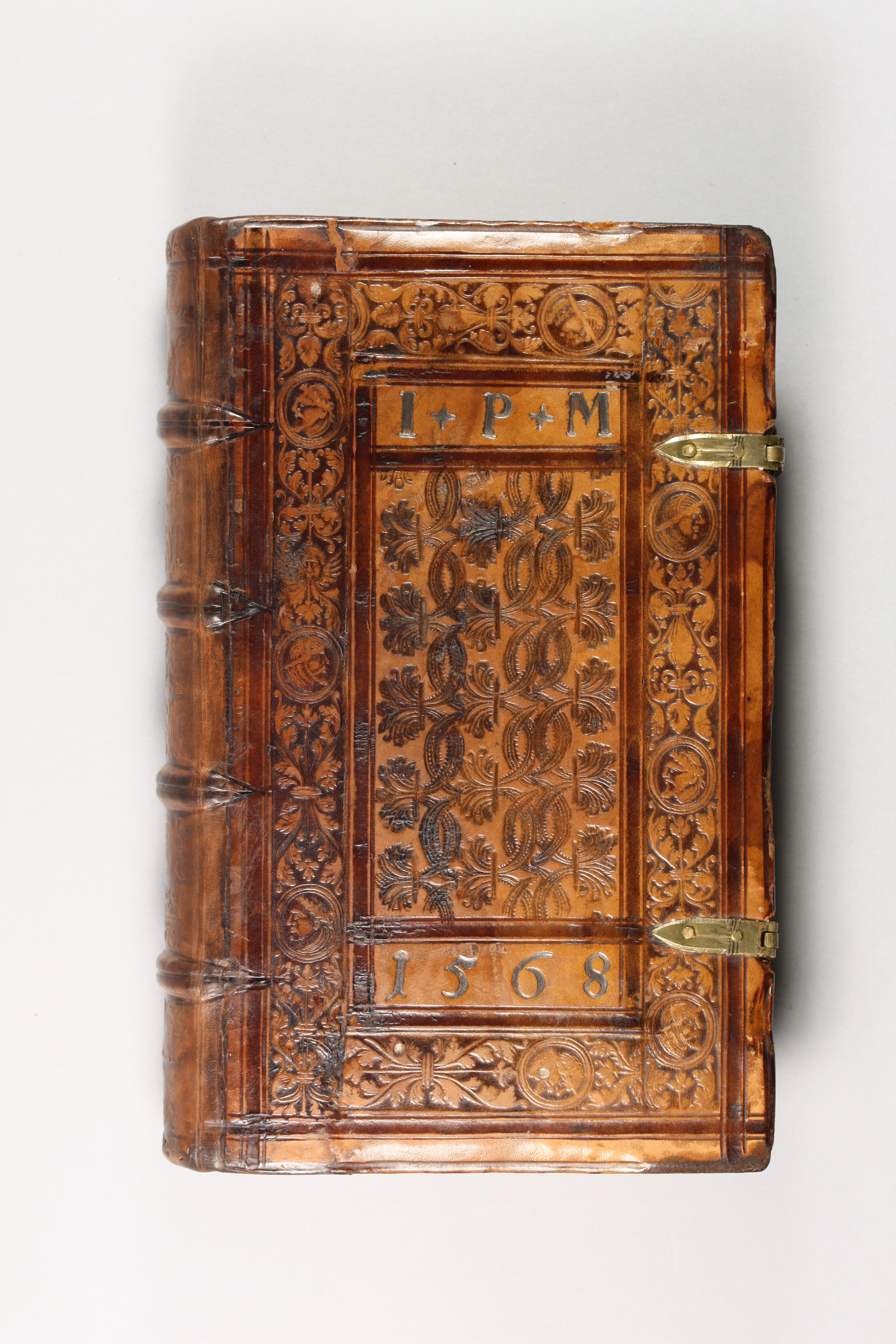
Sammelband of alchemical treatises printed by Samuel Emmel, ca.1568

Sammelband (German: [ˈzaml̩ˌbant]; /ˈzæməlbænt/ ZAM-əl-bant, plural Sammelbände, German: [ˈzaml̩ˌbɛndə] /ˌzæməlˈbɛndə/ ZAM-əl-BEN-də or Sammelbands, German: [ˈzaml̩ˌbant͡s]), or sometimes nonce-volume, is a book comprising a number of separately printed or manuscript works that are subsequently bound together.

In the German language as used in science and humanities, Sammelband refers to an edited volume.

== Sammelbände and William Caxton ==
William Caxton appeared to follow the established manuscript tradition of producing booklets or fascicles of individual works or groups of works that would later be bought together for a patron or buyer.

Nearly forty of these tract volumes have been reconstructed from the evidence of now separately bound parts. They indicate the nature of early readership of Caxton’s work, and they also allow historians to infer something about Caxton’s own sense of his projects.

Perhaps most famous and extensive of his sammelbände work was the collection made out of Caxton's 1476-8 productions, known since the time of Caxton scholar William Blades as “the volume purchased by King George I from the estate of Bishop John Moore in 1714.” This volume is a compendium of Caxton’s first run of vernacular poetry, and the texts within appear as follows:

John Lydgate, Stans ad Mensam
Burgh, Cato’s Distichs
John Lydgate, The Churl and the Bird (2nd edn)
John Lydgate, Horse Goose and Sheep (2nd edn)
John Lydgate, The Temple of Glas
Geoffrey Chaucer, The Temple of Brass (The Parliament of Fowls), also containing Henry Scogan's Moral Balad, and Chaucer’s ballads Truth, Fortune, and the Envoy to Scogan
The Book of Cutesye
Geoffrey Chaucer, Anelida and Arcite, also containing the Complaint to his Purse and a collection of verses known as the Sayings of Chaucer

== Sammelbände from the Tudor Period ==
Modern students of early Tudor literature only rarely encounter extant Sammelbände, most of which were disbound in the nineteenth century.

Yet printed editions of works by (or ascribed to) Geoffrey Chaucer, John Lydgate, Richard Rolle, Margery Kempe, Stephen Hawes, John Skelton, and writers involved in Tudor religious controversy from John Wycliffe to William Tyndale may all be traced to such composite volumes.

== Effects on literature ==
In Caxton’s case specifically, he presents a Lydgatenized Chaucer, even to the point of giving the Parliament of Fowls a unique new title, The Temple of Brass, to follow Lydgate’s Temple of Glas. It is a testimony both to Caxton’s understanding of vernacular poetry and to the tastes of his clientele. It is a volume centered on a particular publishing event, a volume that contains not only the key texts by canonical authors, but the critical instruction for their understanding: The Book of Curtesye.

Generally, the creation of sammelbände can have various effects on the readership of texts. It offers people a larger framework for the understanding of texts within the volumes; these volumes also used prologues and epilogues in order to provide a further framework for readership. These explanatory additions and the use of advertisements, such as Caxton’s “new and improved edition” of The Canterbury Tales shows the movement away from privileged, aristocratic readership towards the readership of the middle class, solidifying printing as a business and a social progression.
