= Kinkeeping =

Act of maintaining family ties

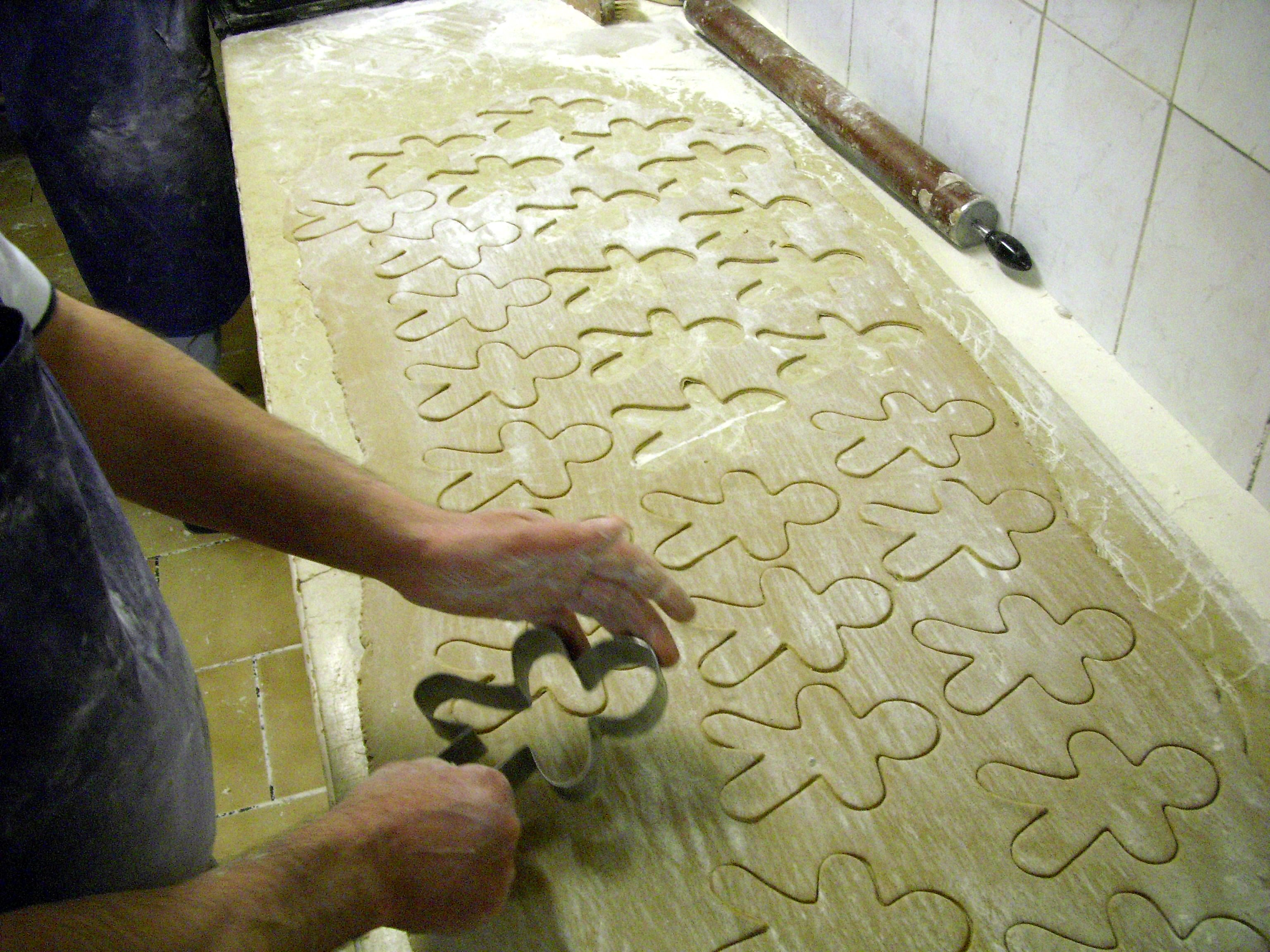
Preparing traditional holiday foods, such as gingerbread men, for family gatherings is a form of kinkeeping.

Kinkeeping is the act of maintaining and strengthening familial ties. It is a form of emotional labor done both out of a sense of obligation and because of emotional attachment. Kinkeepers play an important role in maintaining family cohesion and continuity. Their efforts contribute significantly to the family's social capital, providing emotional support and a sense of belonging to family members.

Sociologist Carolyn Rosenthal defined the term in her 1985 article, "Kinkeeping in the Familial Division of Labor".

== Activities ==
Kinkeeping activities primarily involve facilitating communication between family members and preparing for family gatherings.

Kinkeeping activities help extended family members of differing households stay in touch with one another and strengthen intergenerational bonds. It facilitates the transfer of family traditions, values, and histories from one generation to the next. Families with active kinkeepers tend to feel more connected as a family.

Kinkeeping methods may include telephone calls, writing letters, visiting, sending gifts, acting as a caregiver for disabled or infirm family members, or providing economic aid. They may plan family gatherings and holiday events. Maintaining family traditions, such as preparing particular foods for holidays, is a form of kinkeeping.

Kinkeeping tends to be time-consuming. The kinkeepers may enjoy their role, or they may find it burdensome. They may also feel like their work, which often happens in the background, is not recognized or appreciated.

== Gender roles ==
Women are more likely to act as kinkeepers than men and often organize family events and reunions. A 2006 survey of Americans found that women reported more contact with relatives than men in every age group. A 2017 study found that more than 90% of self-identified kinkeepers were women.

A related activity, called mankeeping, is when women provide emotional support to the men in their lives, especially for men who are socially isolated.
