= Konstanty Janicki =

Polish zoologist

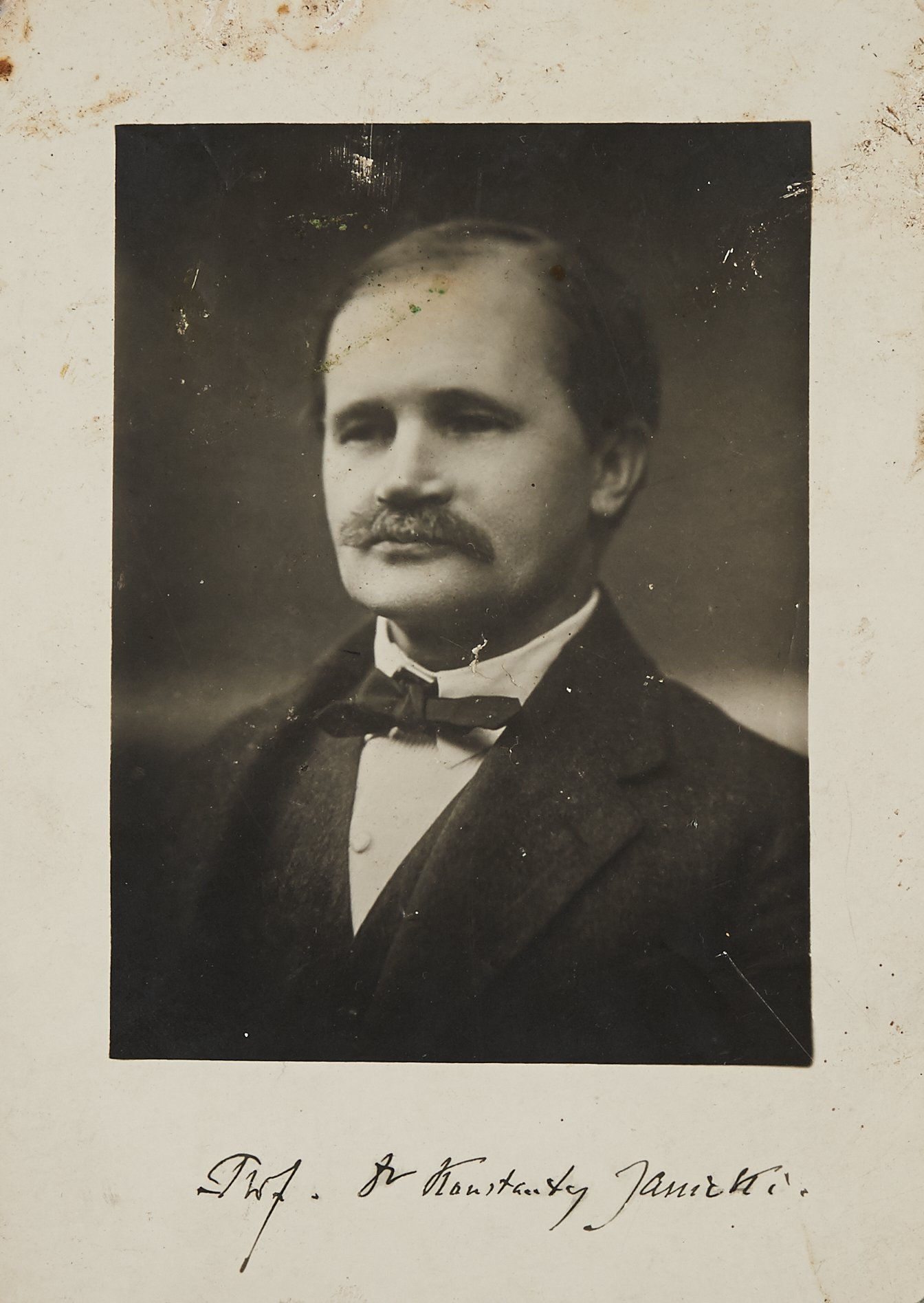

Konstanty Stanisław Janicki (November 16, 1876 – October 25, 1932) was a Polish zoologist who specialized in parasitology. An influential teacher and professor at the University of Warsaw, he is considered as the founder of parasitology research in Poland.

== Biography ==
Janicki was born in Moscow. His mother Emilia née Pellizzaro was of Italian origin and his father Stanisław was a noted engineer. After graduating from the Wojciech Górski Real School in Warsaw he went to Leipzig in 1894 and graduated in the natural sciences in 1898. He was influenced by Rudolf Leuckart. He then went to Freiburg im Breisgau and attended the lectures of August Weismann. In 1901 he worked in Basel under Friedrich Zschokke on tapeworms and received a doctorate in 1906. In 1908 he worked in Rome under Giovanni Battista Grassi. From 1911 he worked in Basel examining development in the Cestodes. He became a professor of zoology in 1919 at the University of Warsaw. With Feliks Rosen he studied the life cycle of Diphyllobothrium latum. They suggested that copepods carried an intermediate stage. He also studied stages of parasites in fish, travelling twice to the Volga to examine the tapeworms of sturgeon (Amphilina foliacea) suggesting that they developed by neoteny. He studied the life history of Cystopsis acipenseri along with Karel Rašin. He also began to study protozoan parasites and described what he called the parabasal apparatus.

== Major works ==
Janicki's influential publications included:

- Janicki C., 1908. Contribuzione alla conesceza di alcuni protozoi parassiti della Periplaneta ortientalis (Lophomonas blattarum Stein: L. striata Butschli; Amoeba blattae Butschli). Atti della Reale Accademia dei Lincei, Rendiconti delle Classe di Scienze Fisiche, Matematiche e Naturali, Roma 17, 140–151.
- Janicki C., 1909. Uber Kern und Kernteilung bei Entamoeba blattae Butschli. Biologisches Centrablatt 29, 381–393.
- Janicki C., 1910. Untersuchungen an parasitichen Flagellaten. I. Lophomonas blattarum Stein, L. striata Butschli. Zeitschrift für Wissenschaftliche Zool. 95, 243–315.
- Janicki C., 1911. Zur Kenntnis des Parabasalapparats bei parasitischen Flagellaten. Biologisches Centralblatt 31, 321–330.
- Janicki C., 1912. Bemerkungen zum Kernteilungsvorgang bei Flagellaten, namentlich bei parasitischen Formen. Verhandlungen der Naturforscheden Gesellschaft in Basel 23, 82–111.
- Janicki C., 1912. Untersuchungen as parasitischen Arten der Gattung Paramoeba Schaudinn P. pigmentifera Grassi und P. chaeognathi Grassi. Verhandlungen der Naturforschenden Geselchaft in Basel 23, 6-21.
- Janicki C., 1915. Untersuchungen an parasitischen Flagellaten. 2. Die Gattung Devescovina, Parajoenia, Stephanonympha, Calonympha. Uber den Parabasalapparat. Über Kernkonstitution und Kernteilung Zeit. wiss. Zool. 112:573-691.
- Janicki C., 1920. Grudlinien einer “Cercomer” Theorie zur Morphologie der Trematoden und Cestoden. Festschr. für Zschokke. 30, 1-22.
- Janicki C., 1928. Studien am Genus Paramoeba Schaund. Neue Folge I. Zeitschrift für Wissenschaftliche Zool. 131, 588–644.
- Janicki C., 1929. Neue Beitrage uber Paramoeba Schaud. (Comptes Rendus). 10 Congres International de Zoologie, Budapest, 4-10 Sept. 1927, Deuxieme partie 903–905.
- Janicki C., 1930. Über die jüngsten Zustände von Amphilina foliacea in der Fischleibeshöhle, sowie Generelles zur Auffassung de Genus Amphilina. G. Wagen. Zool. Anz. 90, 190–205.
- Janicki C., 1932. Studien am Genus Paramoeba Schaud. Neue Polge II. Uber das Trichopodium, nebst einer Erganzung zum 1 Teil. Zeitschrift für Wissenschaftliche Zool. 142. 587–623.
- Janicki C., Rosen F., 1917. Le cycle evolutif du Dibothriocephalus latus L. Recherches experimentalles et observation. Bull. Soc. Nauchatel. Sci. Nat. 42, 19–53.

== Personal character ==
Colleagues noted that Janicki was a reserved person, spoke little at conferences but excelled in experimental skills and in his lectures. He held conservative views, suggesting that universities were not suitable for women and had prejudices against Jews, possibly due to his interactions with Feliks Rosen. He also hated entomology. His closest colleague was Jan Tur (1875-1942). Janicki suffered from an ailment and was said to have been depressed. He committed suicide by hanging in the toilet of his home. Two days earlier he had asked a janitor to purchase rope supposedly for the curtains. He is buried in the Powązki Cemetery.
