= Pavel Mitrofanov =

Russian embryologist and histologist

Pavel Ilyich Mitrofanov
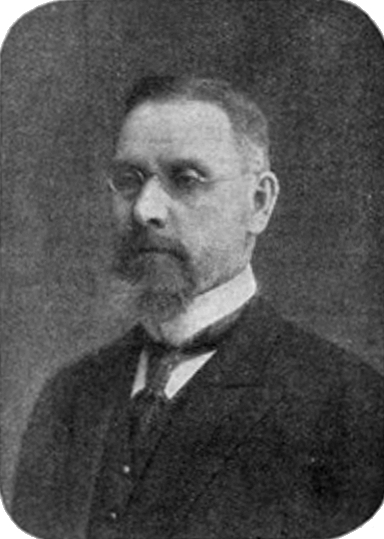
- Born: Pavel Ilyich Mitrofanov; Викентий Фердинандович Хмелевский; 3 July 1857; Arkhangelsk
- Died: 29 December 1920 (aged 63); Rostov-on-Don
- Occupations: embryologist and histologist

Pavel Ilyich Mitrofanov (Russian: Павел Ильич Митрофанов; 3 July 1857, Arkhangelsk — 29 December 1920, Rostov-on-Don) was a Russian Empire embryologist and histologist. Doctor of Zoology. Rector of Samara Polytechnic Institute in 1915―1917 and of Don University in 1919―1920.

== Biography ==
Pavel Ilyich Mitrofanov was born on 3 July 1857 (21 June Old Style) in Arkhangelsk in the family of a government official. In 1877 he graduated with honours from the Arkhangelsk High School and in the same year he enrolled to the Natural Sciences Department of the Physics and Mathematics Faculty of the Imperial Moscow University. He graduated from the university in 1881 and began working as a teacher in Moscow. Privat-docent since 1886. Since 1896 he was a Professor of the Imperial University of Warsaw.

In 1915, after the outbreak of World War I, the University of Warsaw was evacuated first to Moscow, and then to Rostov-on-Don. Mitrofanov himself chose to accept the proposal of Aleksandr Naumov, Marshal of Samara Nobility to head the newly formed Samara Polytechnic Institute (now Samara State Technical University), although he also remained the head of the Department of Comparative Anatomy, Histology and Embryology, and also was in charge of the zoo laboratory and the zoological cabinet at the evacuated Warsaw University. Since he was simultaneously an employee of the University in Rostov-on-Don, he very often had to make long trips between two cities, although his main residence was Rostov-on-Don.

On 1 September 1917 his term of office of the Rector of Samara Polytechnic was expired and he was immediately seconded to the newly formed Don University. For a short period of time at the post of rector of the Samara University, he did a lot of preparatory work for the organization of the institute.

He became the last elected rector of Don University. With his help the "Volunteer Army Assistance Society" was established in the city, and the Rostov branch of the White Cross, which arose from the ladies' circle, was headed by his wife.

In his last years of life Mitrofanov was almost completely blind. He died on 29 December 1920. As Professor Y. Shchelkanovtsev wrote in his obituary, "He died in his laboratory, where he lived lately all alone and under extremely unfavorable conditions".

=== Scientific work ===
Mitrofanov was the author of more than 110 scientific works. He was engaged in study of the development of peripheral nerves and their endings and comparative embryological studies of birds. He also dealt with teratology. In his experimental research he managed to give a correct explanation of the causes of a number of physiological abnormalities.
