= Silva rerum =

Polish and Lithuanian family chronicle

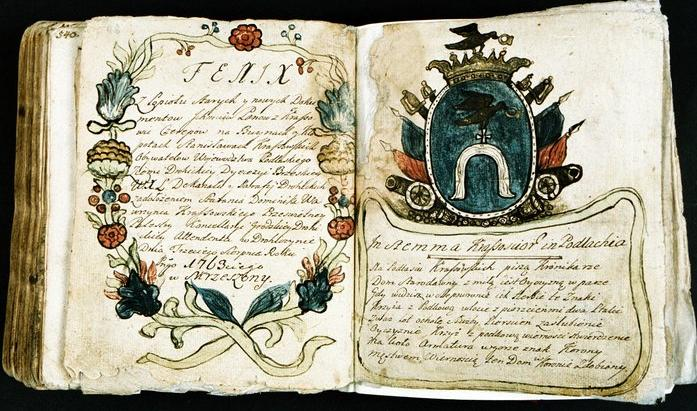
Silva Rerum of Krassowscy (Ślepowron coat of arms) family from Ziemia Drohicka in Podlasie

Silva rerum (plural: silvae rerum, Latin for "forest of things"; also Polonized as sylwa, sometimes described as home chronicle) was a multi-generational chronicle kept by many Polish and Lithuanian noble families from the 16th through 18th centuries. Some authors of modern Polish postmodern literature try to create works similar to the silvae rerum of the past.

In historical Poland it was written by members of the szlachta (Polish nobility) as a diary or memoir for the entire family, recording family traditions, among other matters; they were not intended for a wider audience or printing (although there were a few exceptions); some were also lent to friends of the family, who were allowed to add their comments to them. It was added to by many generations, and contained various information: diary-type entries on current events, memoirs, letters, political speeches, copies of legal documents, gossips, jokes and anecdotes, financial documents, economic information (price of grain, etc.), philosophical musings, poems, genealogical trees, advice (agricultural, medical, moral) for the descendants and others. The wealth of information in silva is staggering; they contain anything that their authors wished to record for future generations. Some silvae rerum were of truly enormous proportions, with thousands of pages (Gloger cites one of 1764 pages) although most common size is from 500 to 800 pages. They were written from the 16th century (the earliest entries are from the times of the king Stefan Batory) to the mid-18th century (times of the Saxon kings in Poland).

Silvae rerum were the source of our modern knowledge of poems by such writers as Andrzej Morsztyn, and even long diaries, including the famous Chocim War by Wacław Potocki and the Diaries by Jan Chryzostom Pasek. They also contain a wealth of information about the customs of Polish nobility of the past centuries. A major collection of silvae perished during the destruction of Polish libraries by Germans in World War II.

Silva Rerum (2008-2016) is the title of a four part saga of internationally bestselling historical novels by Lithuanian writer Kristina Sabaliauskaitė about the noble Norvaiša family set in Polish-Lithuanian Commonwealth in 1659-1795.

== See also ==
- Commonplace book
- Family cookbooks
- Family traditions
- Gawęda szlachecka
