= Kamil Janicki =

Polish historian (born 1987)

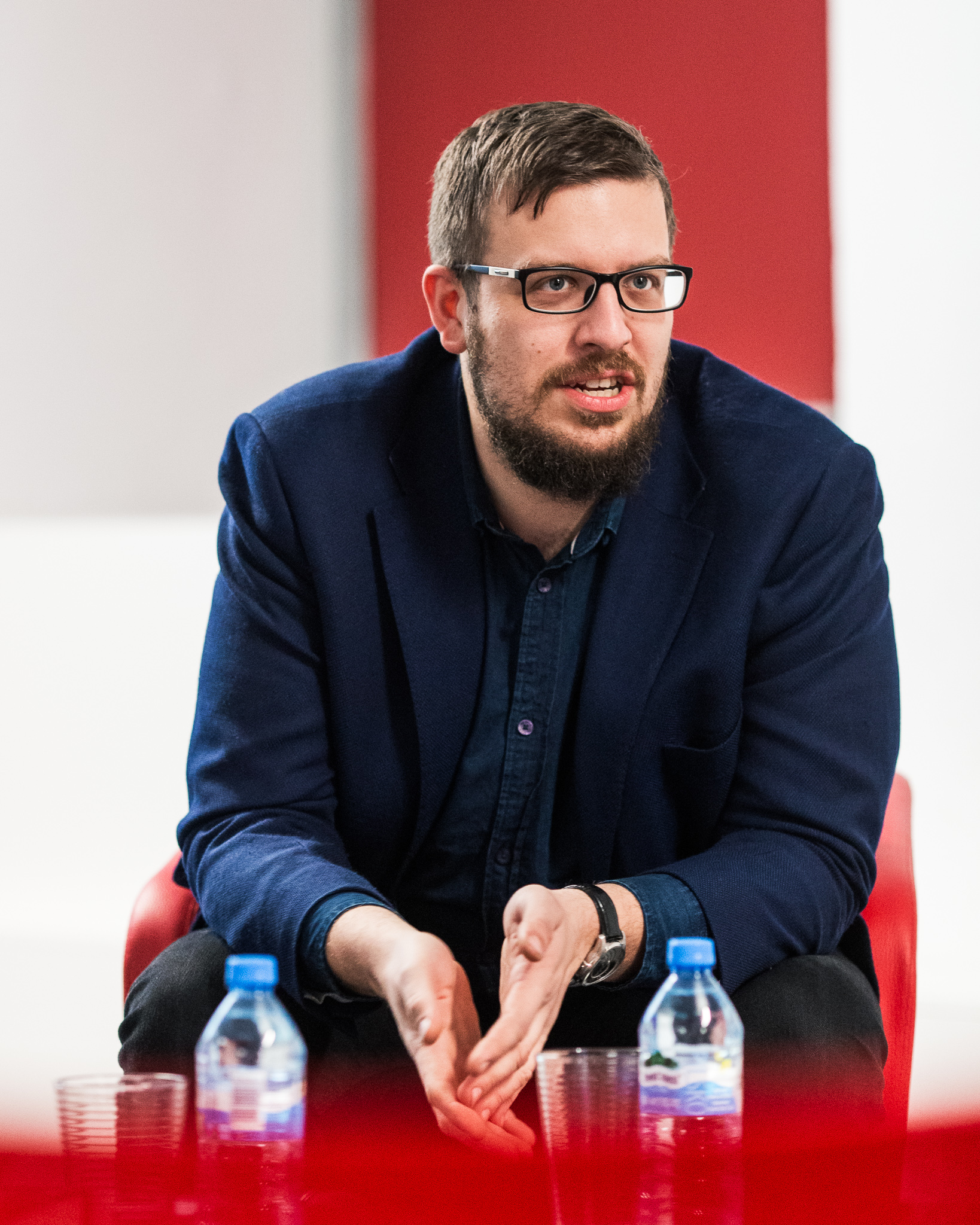
- Kamil Janicki, 2018
- Born: 1987 (age 38–39)
- Citizenship: Polish
- Education: Jagiellonian University
- Occupations: Historian, writer
- Website: kamiljanicki.pl

Kamil Janicki (born 1987) is a historian, writer and journalist.

== Biography ==
In 2011 he graduated in history from the Jagiellonian University, having submitted master's thesis Alkohol i pijaństwo we wspomnieniach żołnierskich z II wojny światowej (Alcohol and drunkenness in soldiers' memories from the World War II), supervised by Andrzej Chwalba. His books have reached a combined print run of over 200,000 copies. His research interests include interwar Poland, the Polish Middle Ages and the Jagiellonian epoch. He was editor-in-chief of the web portals ciekawostkihistoryczne.pl and wielkahistoria.pl.

== Criticism ==
Janicki has been criticized by Polish academics and historians for selective use of historical sources, decontextualization of historical evidence, and reliance on stereotypes that oversimplify the political, social, and religious realities of the Polish–Lithuanian Commonwealth:

He draws on stereotypical perceptions without subjecting them to critical scrutiny. His writing is highly tendentious, selectively presenting only those facts, events, and opinions that support his argument. Furthermore, he fails to place the phenomena he discusses within a broader historical context. His polemical writings bring to mind the propaganda pamphlets produced by the partitioning powers, which sought to justify the division of the Polish-Lithuanian Commonwealth by portraying it as a state incapable of sustaining its own existence. In July 1772, the Austrian State Chancellor Wenzel Anton von Kaunitz, seeking to persuade Maria Theresa, who remained unconvinced by the joint declaration of the three courts, to consent to its publication, argued to the Empress that although its contents “did not correspond to the truth, they were not outright falsehoods either.” The same can be said of the discussed work.

== Books ==
- Pijana wojna. Alkohol podczas II wojny światowej. Instytut Wydawniczy Erica. 2012. ISBN 978-83-623-2955-7.
- Pierwsze damy II Rzeczpospolitej. Znak. 2012. ISBN 978-83-240-2201-4.
- Upadłe damy II Rzeczpospolitej. Znak. 2013. ISBN 978-83-240-2792-7.
- Damy złotego wieku. Znak Horyzont. 2014. ISBN 978-83-240-3030-9.
- Epoka hipokryzji. Seks i erotyka w przedwojennej Polsce. CiekawostkiHistoryczne.pl. 2015. ISBN 978-83-240-3057-6.
- Żelazne damy. Kobiety, które zbudowały Polskę. Znak Horyzont. 2015. ISBN 978-83-240-3081-1.
- Damy ze skazą. Znak Horyzont. 2016. ISBN 978-83-240-3466-6.
- Damy polskiego imperium. Znak Horyzont. 2017. ISBN 978-83-240-4248-7.
- Epoka milczenia. Przedwojenna Polska, o której wstydzimy się mówić. Znak Horyzont. 2018. ISBN 978-83-240-4210-4.
- Niepokorne damy. Kobiety, które wywalczyły niepodległą Polskę. Znak Horyzont. 2018. ISBN 978-83-240-5476-3.
- Damy przeklęte. Kobiety, które pogrzebały Polskę. Znak Horyzont. 2019. ISBN 978-83-240-5797-9.
- Seryjni mordercy II RP. Wydawnictwo Literackie. 2020. ISBN 978-83-08-07046-8.
- Damy Władysława Jagiełły. Wydawnictwo Literackie. 2021. ISBN 978-83-08-08614-8.
- Pańszczyzna. Prawdziwa historia polskiego niewolnictwa. Wydawnictwo Poznańskie. 2021. ISBN 978-83-68263-36-7.
- Damy srebrnego wieku. Wydawnictwo Literackie. 2022. ISBN 978-83-08-07615-6.
- Wawel. Biografia. Wydawnictwo Literackie. 2022. ISBN 978-83-08-07695-8.
- Warcholstwo. Prawdziwa historia polskiej szlachty. Wydawnictwo Poznańskie. 2023. ISBN 978-83-67727-14-3.
- Cywilizacja Słowian. Prawdziwa historia największego ludu Europy. Wydawnictwo Poznańskie. 2023. ISBN 978-83-67815-38-3.
- Średniowiecze w liczbach. Wydawnictwo Poznańskie. 2024. ISBN 978-83-68-04599-4.
- Życie w chłopskiej chacie. Wydawnictwo Poznańskie. 2024. ISBN 978-83-68-26364-0.
- Dziesięcina. Prawdziwa historia kleru w dawnej Polsce. Wydawnictwo Poznańskie. 2025. ISBN 978-83-68576-67-2.
