= Table-book =

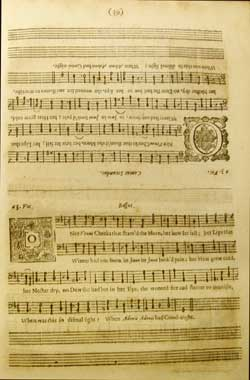
A table-book printing from Henry Lawes' The treasury of musick: containing ayres and dialogues to sing to the theorbo-lute or basse-viol., 1669.

A table-book is a manuscript or printed book which is arranged so that all the parts of a piece of music can be read from it while seated around a table. They were made in the 16th and 17th century for both instrumental and vocal pieces. They are an extension of the idea of Choir books, in which all parts are displayed on one page, in contrast with partbooks, which have a different book for each part (one book for all the soprano parts, another for all the altos, etc.) and each performer has their own book.

The first example of such a book is probably Le parangon des chansons (1538) by Jacques Moderne of Lyon. There are far more English than Continental examples of this type of book. English sources contain many lute pieces and works by John Dowland, including his Lachrimae.

The books began displaying duets, and later quartets. Later systems of displaying parts worked for up to six performers, and in extreme cases as many as 12.

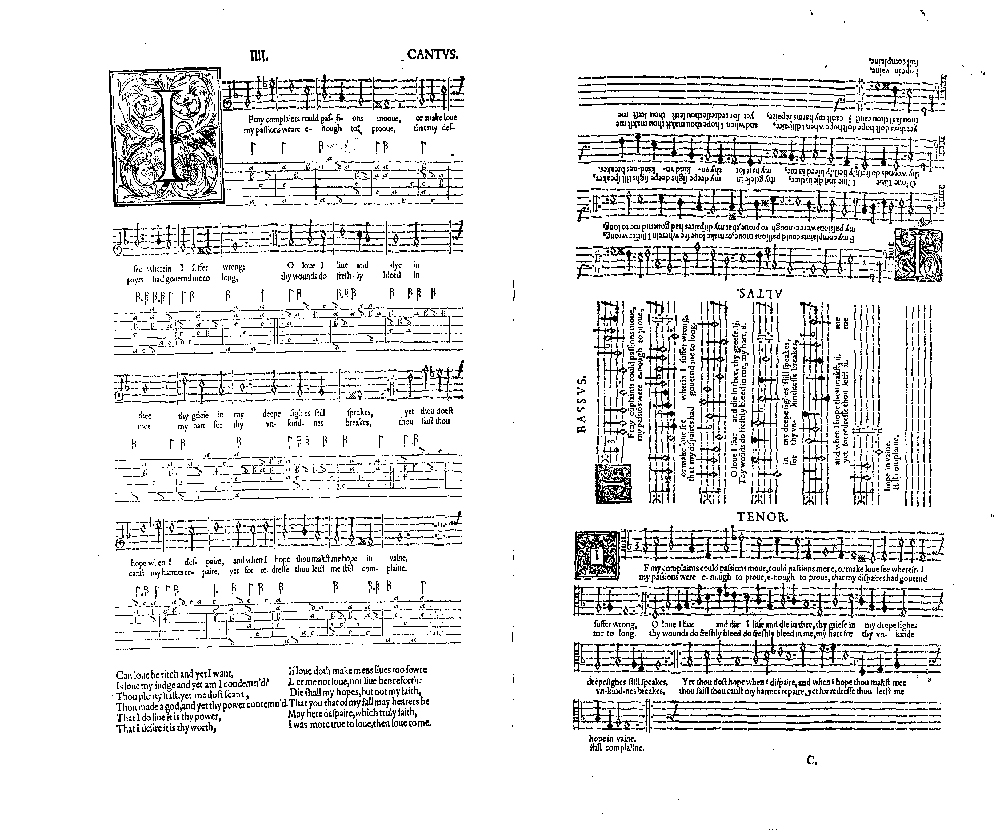
A more involved example, showing four parts and multiple verses

The publisher Peter Short published 30 lute song books in the table-book format, many of them containing Dowland's music, beginning in 1597.
