= History of the family =

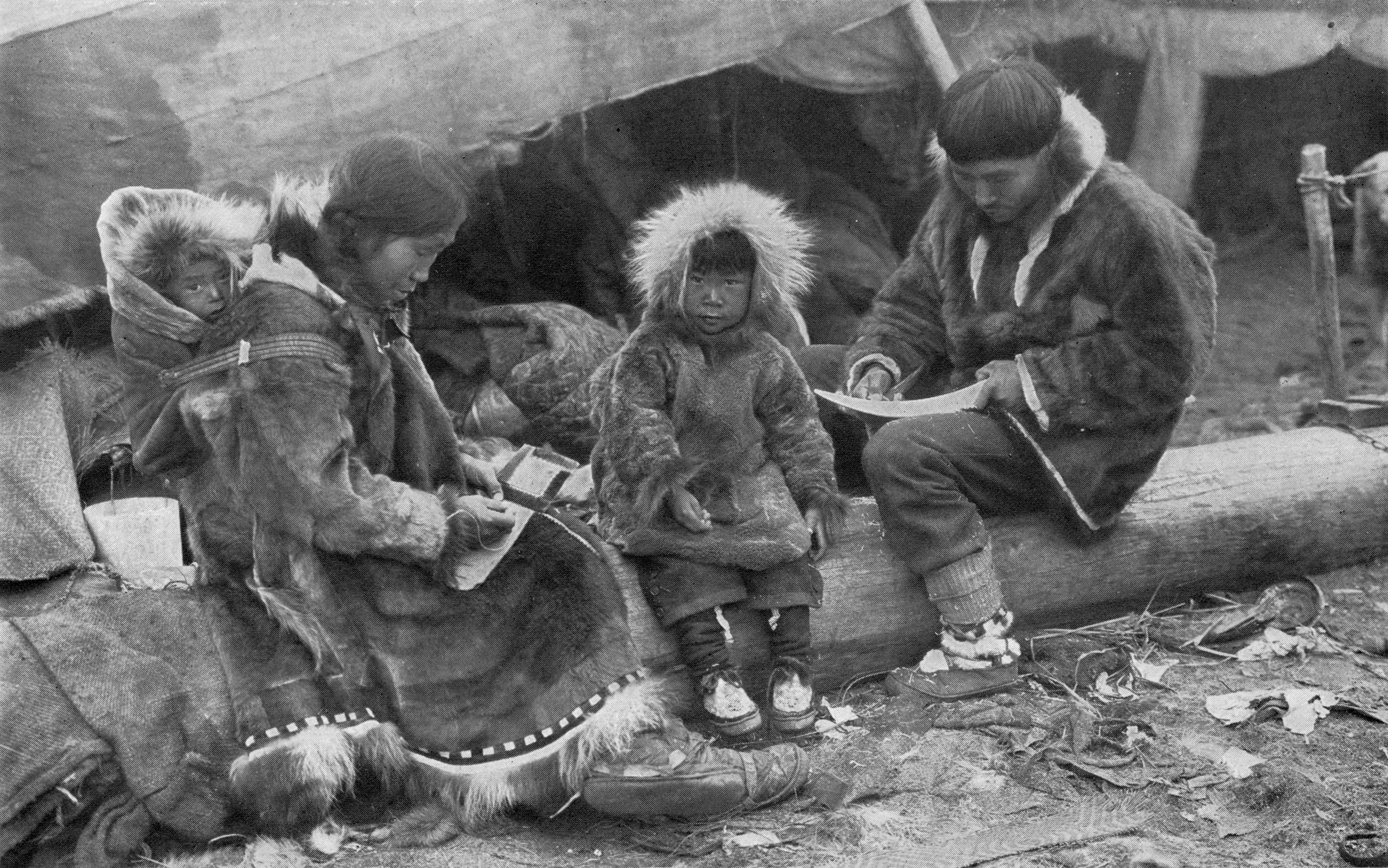
An Eskimo family

The history of the family is a branch of social history that concerns the sociocultural evolution of kinship groups from prehistoric to modern times. The family has a universal and basic role in all societies. Research on the history of the family crosses disciplines and cultures, aiming to understand the structure and function of the family from many viewpoints. For example, sociological, ecological or economical perspectives are used to view the interrelationships between the individual, their relatives, and the historical time. The study of family history has shown that family systems are flexible, culturally diverse and adaptive to ecological and economical conditions.

== Definition of family ==
Co-residence and organization by kinship are both important in the development of the concept of the family. A co-residential group that makes up a household may share general survival-goals and a residence, but may not fulfill the varied and sometimes ambiguous requirements for the definition of a family. (In Latin, familia – the source of the English-language word "family" – meant "household" or "slave staff". The Latin word domus meant both "family" and "household".)

== Historiography ==
The history of the family emerged as a separate field of history in the 1970s, with close ties to anthropology and sociology. The trend was especially pronounced in the U.S. and Canada. It emphasizes demographic patterns and public policy. It is quite separate from genealogy, although it often draws on the same primary sources such as censuses and family records. An influential pioneering study came in 1978 called Women, Work, and Family. The authors, Louise A. Tilly and Joan W. Scott, broke new ground with their broad interpretive framework and emphasis on the variable factors shaping women's place in the family and economy in France and England. It considered the interaction of production and reproduction in an analysis of women's wage labor and thus helped to bring together labor and family history. Much work has been done on the dichotomy in women's lives between the private sphere and the public. For a recent worldwide overview covering 7000 years, see Maynes and Waltner (2012).

== Family history methods ==
History of the family
- What is the proper unit for the study of the history of the family — the individual? Group? The civilization? The culture?
- Are there broad patterns and progress? How to present a universal family history?

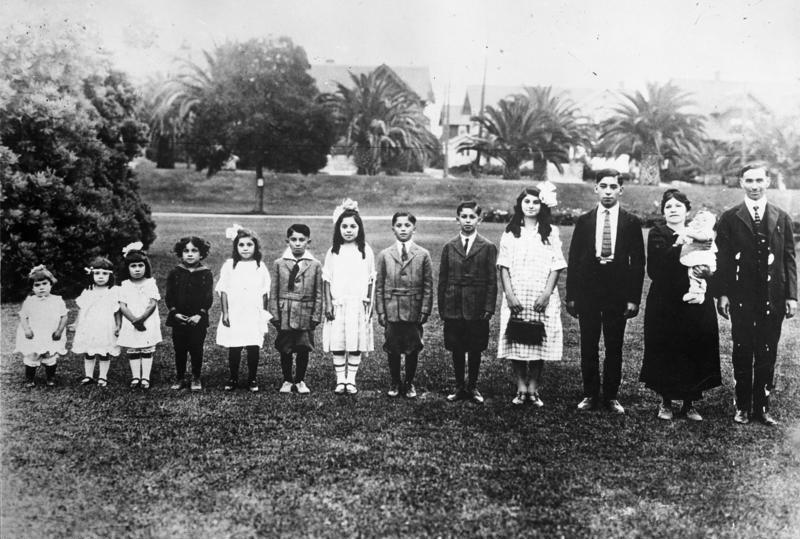
Family in Los Angeles

Historical perspectives of family studies

These are some approaches through which family history can be viewed:

- Ancient history : the family in ancient times until the Early Middle Ages.
- Anthropology: the family in cultural context.
- Archaeology: the study of the family culture.
- Art history: the family representation in visual art.
- Chronology: the science of localizing family/events in time.
- Comparative history: the historical analysis of the family not confined to national boundaries.
- Contemporary history: the study of historical/social events that are immediately relevant to the present time.
- Cultural history: the study of the family in the cultural context.
- Ethnography: the study of family customs.
- Genealogy: names of people in lines of descent.
- Gender history: the family in the perspective of gender.
- Immigration: the study of the family and nationalities.
- Legal history: the study of the law of the family.
- Modern history: the study of the modern family.
- Migration: the study of the family pattern of global movement.
- People's history: the family from the perspective of common people.
- Psychohistory: the study of the psychological motivations of family events.
- Social history: the study of processes of social change.
- Theater history: the family representation in the theater arts.
- Women's history: the study of females and the family.
- World history: the study of the family from a global perspective.

Early scholars of family history applied Darwin's biological theory of evolution in their theory of the evolution of family systems. American anthropologist, Lewis H. Morgan, published Ancient Society in 1877, based on his theory of the three stages of human progress, from savagery through barbarism, to civilization. Morgan's book was the "inspiration for Friedrich Engels' book", The Origin of the Family, Private Property, and the State, published in 1884. Engels expanded Morgan's hypothesis that economic factors caused the transformation of primitive community into a class-divided society. Engels' theory of resource control and later that of Karl Marx was used to explain the cause and effect of change in family structure and function. The popularity of this theory was largely unmatched until the 1980s, when other sociological theories, particularly structural functionalism, gained acceptance.

The book, Centuries of Childhood by Philippe Ariès, published in France in 1960, had a great influence on the revival of the field of family history studies. Ariès used the analysis of demographic data to draw the conclusion that the concept of childhood was a concept that emerged in modern nuclear families. The history of childhood is a growing subfield.

=== Research methodology ===
Since the early 20th century, scholars have begun to unify methods of gathering data. One notable book by W.I. Thomas and Florian Znaniecki, Polish Peasant in Europe and America (1918), was influential in establishing the precedence of systematic longitudinal data analysis. Gathering church files, court records, letters, architectural and archeological evidence, art and iconography, and food and material culture increased the objectivity and reproducibility of family reconstruction studies. Studies of current family systems additionally employ qualitative observations, interviews, focus groups, and quantitative surveys.

== Family of origin ==
In most cultures of the world, the beginning of family history is set in creation myths. In Works and Days, the ancient Greek poet Hesiod describes the epic destruction of four previous Ages of Man. The utopia that was the Golden Age was eventually replaced by the current Iron Age; a time when gods made man live in "hopeless misery and toil." Hesiod's second poem Theogony, described the Greek gods' relationships and family ties. Ancient Greeks believed that among them, were descendants of gods who qualified for priesthood or other privileged social status.

The Judeo-Christian tradition originates in the Bible's Book of Genesis. The first man and woman created by God gave rise to all of the humanity. The Bible reflects the patriarchal worldview and often refers to the practice of polygamy. In biblical times, men sought to prove their descent from the family of the prophet Moses in order to be accepted into the priesthood.

Roman families would include everyone within a household under the authoritarian role of the father, the pater familias; this included grown children and the slaves of the household. Children born outside of marriage, from common and legal concubinage, could not inherit the father's property or name; instead, they belong to the social group and family of their mothers'.

Most ancient cultures like those of Assyria, Egypt, and China, kept records of successors in the ruling dynasties to legitimize their power as divine in origin. Both the Inca king and the Egyptian Pharaoh claimed that they were direct descendants of the Sun God, and until the British Civil War, monarchs in England were considered second only to God and as God's representative on earth. Many other cultures, such as the Inca of South America, the Kinte of Africa, and the Māori of New Zealand, did not have a written language and kept the history of their descent as an oral tradition.

Many cultures used other symbols to document their history of descent. Totem poles are indigenous to the people of the Pacific Northwest. The symbolic representation of the pole goes back to the history of their ancestors and the family identity, in addition to being tied with the spiritual world.

European nobility had long and well-documented kinship relationships, sometimes taking their roots in the Middle Ages. In 1538, King Henry VIII of England mandated that churches begin the record-keeping practice that soon spread throughout Europe. Britain's Domesday Book from 1086, is one of the oldest European genealogy records. In ancient and medieval times, the history of one's ancestors guaranteed religious and secular prestige.

Christian culture puts notable emphasis on the family. There were two distinct family patterns that emerged in Christian Europe throughout the Middle Ages. In most of Southern and Eastern Europe, marriage occurred between two individuals who had lived with their parents for a long period of time. The man involved was older, usually in his late twenties, and the girl was often still a teenager. Their household would contain several generations, an occurrence demographers denote as a "complex" household. In contrast, areas in Northwestern Europe gave rise to a familial structure that was unique for the time period. The man and woman were typically around the same age, and would wait until they were in their early twenties to marry. Following the marriage, the couple would set up their own independent household (termed a "nuclear" household structure). This led to a lower birthrate, as well as greater levels of economic stability for the new couple. This also served as a check on the increasing population in Europe. Many women in this region during this time period would never marry at all. Historically, extended families were the basic family unit in the Catholic culture and countries.

In 1632, Virginia was the first state in the New World mandating a civil law that christenings, marriages, and burials were to be recorded. Historians of the family have made extensive use of genealogical data of the sort collected by organizations of descendants such as the National Society of Old Plymouth Colony Descendants, The Society of Mayflower Descendants, Daughters of the American Revolution, National Society Sons of the American Revolution, and Society of the Descendants of the Founding Fathers of New England. The Cambridge Group for the History of Population and Social Structure, a major scholarly organization in England founded in 1964, regularly consulted genealogists in developing their database for the history of the English family and statistical analysis of long-term demographic trends.

== Evolution of household ==
The organization of the pre-industrial family is now believed to be similar to modern types of family. Many sociologists used to believe that the nuclear family was the product of industrialization, but evidence highlighted by historian Peter Laslett and anthropologist Joseph Henrich suggests that the causality is reversed and that industrialization was so effective in North-western Europe specifically because the pre-existence of the nuclear family fostered its development.

Family types of pre-industrial Europe belonged into two basic groups, the "simple household system" (the nuclear family), and the "joint family system" (the extended family). A simple household system featured a relatively late age of marriage for both men and women and the establishment of a separate household after the marriage or neolocality. A joint family household system was characterized by earlier marriage for women, co-residence with the husband's family or patrilocality, and co-residing of multiple generations. Many households consisted of unrelated servants and apprentices residing for periods of years, and at that time, belonging to the family. Due to shorter life expectancy and high mortality rates in the pre-industrialized world, much of the structure of a family depended on the average age of the marriage of women. Late marriages, as occurred in the simple household system, left little time for three-generation families to form. Conversely, in the joint family household system, early marriages allowed for multi-generational families to form.

The pre-industrial family had many functions including food production, landholding, regulation of inheritance, reproduction, socialization and education of its members. External roles allowed for participation in religion and politics. Social status was also strictly connected to one's family.

Additionally, in the absence of government institutions, the family was the only resource to cope with sickness and aging. Because of the industrial revolution and new work and living conditions, families changed, transferring to public institutions responsibility for food production and the education and welfare of its aging and sick members. Post-industrial families became more private, nuclear, domestic and based on the emotional bonding between husband and wife, and between parents and children.

Historian Lawrence Stone identifies three major types of family structure in England: in about 1450–1630, the open lineage family dominated. The Renaissance era, 1550–1700, brought the restricted patriarchal nuclear family. The early modern world 1640-1800 emphasized the closed domesticated nuclear family. Stone's conclusions have been disputed by other historians; Peter Laslett and Alan MacFarlane believe the nuclear family became common in England beginning in the thirteenth century.

Post-materialist and postmodern values have become research topics related to the family. According to Judith Stacy in 1990, "We are living, I believe, through a transitional and contested period of family history, a period 'after' the modern family order." As of 2019, there are more than 110 million single people in the United States. More than 50% of the American adult population is single compared to 22% in 1950. Jeremy Greenwood, Professor of economics at the University of Pennsylvania has explored how technological progress has affected the family. In particular, he discusses how technological advance has led to more married women working, a decline in fertility, an increase in the number of single households, social change, longer lifespans, and a rise in the fraction of life spent in retirement. Sociologist Elyakim Kislev lists some of the major drivers for the decline in the family institution: women’s growing independence, risk aversion in an age of divorce, demanding careers, rising levels of education, individualism, secularization, popular media, growing transnational mobility, and urbanization processes.

== See also ==
- Adoption
- Clan
- Cohabitation
- Common-law marriage
- Complex family
- Consanguinity
- Custom and Myth / The Early History of the Family
- Domestic violence
- Dysfunctional family
- Family economics
- Family history, in genealogy
- Family in the United States
- Family law
- Family
- Hindu joint family
- Kinship
- Marriage
- Parenting
- Polygamy
- Same-sex marriage
- Sociology of the family
