= Outline of childhood =

Overview of and topical guide to childhood

The following outline is provided as an overview of and topical guide to childhood:

Children – biologically, a child (plural: children) is generally a human between the stages of birth and puberty. Some definitions include the unborn (termed fetus). The legal definition of "child" generally refers to a minor, otherwise known as a person younger than the age of majority. "Child" may also describe a relationship with a parent or authority figure, or signify group membership in a clan, tribe, or religion; it can also signify being strongly affected by a specific time, place, or circumstance, as in "a child of nature" or "a child of the Sixties."

== Child education ==
- Education reform
- Education
- Learning disability
- List of education topics
- Public education

=== School ===
- School
- School run
- School uniform
- Student

==== Stages ====
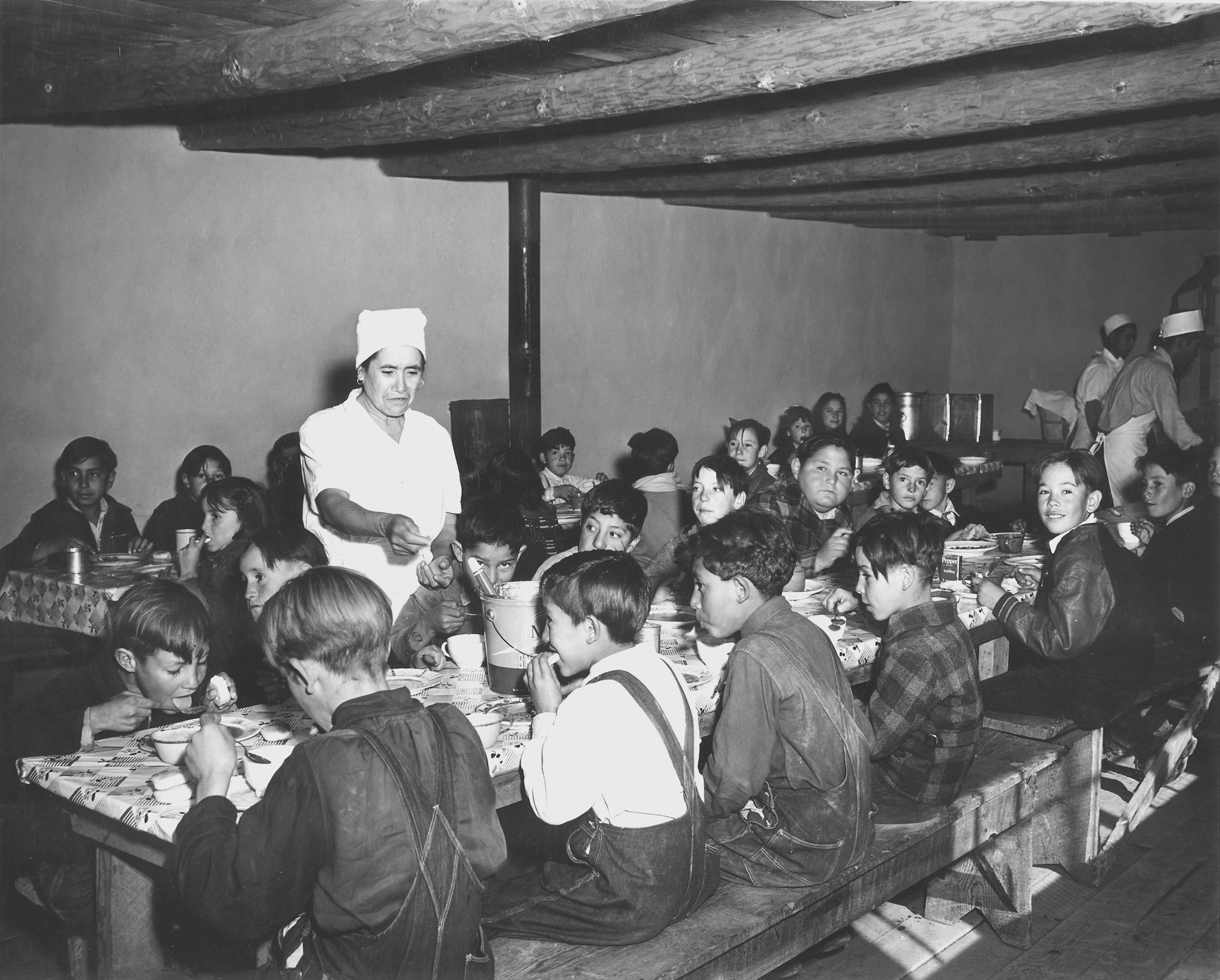
Children eating lunch at school in Penasco, New Mexico (1941)

- Educational stage
- Primary education
- Primary school
- Middle school
- Secondary education
- Secondary school

==== Methods and theories ====
- Bilingual education
- Boarding School
- Country Day School movement
- Homeschooling
- Montessori method
- Orff Schulwerk
- Outcome-based education
- Philosophy of education
- Phonics
- Prussian education
- Reggio Emilia approach
- Religious education
- Suzuki method
- Waldorf School

==== Instruction content and tools ====
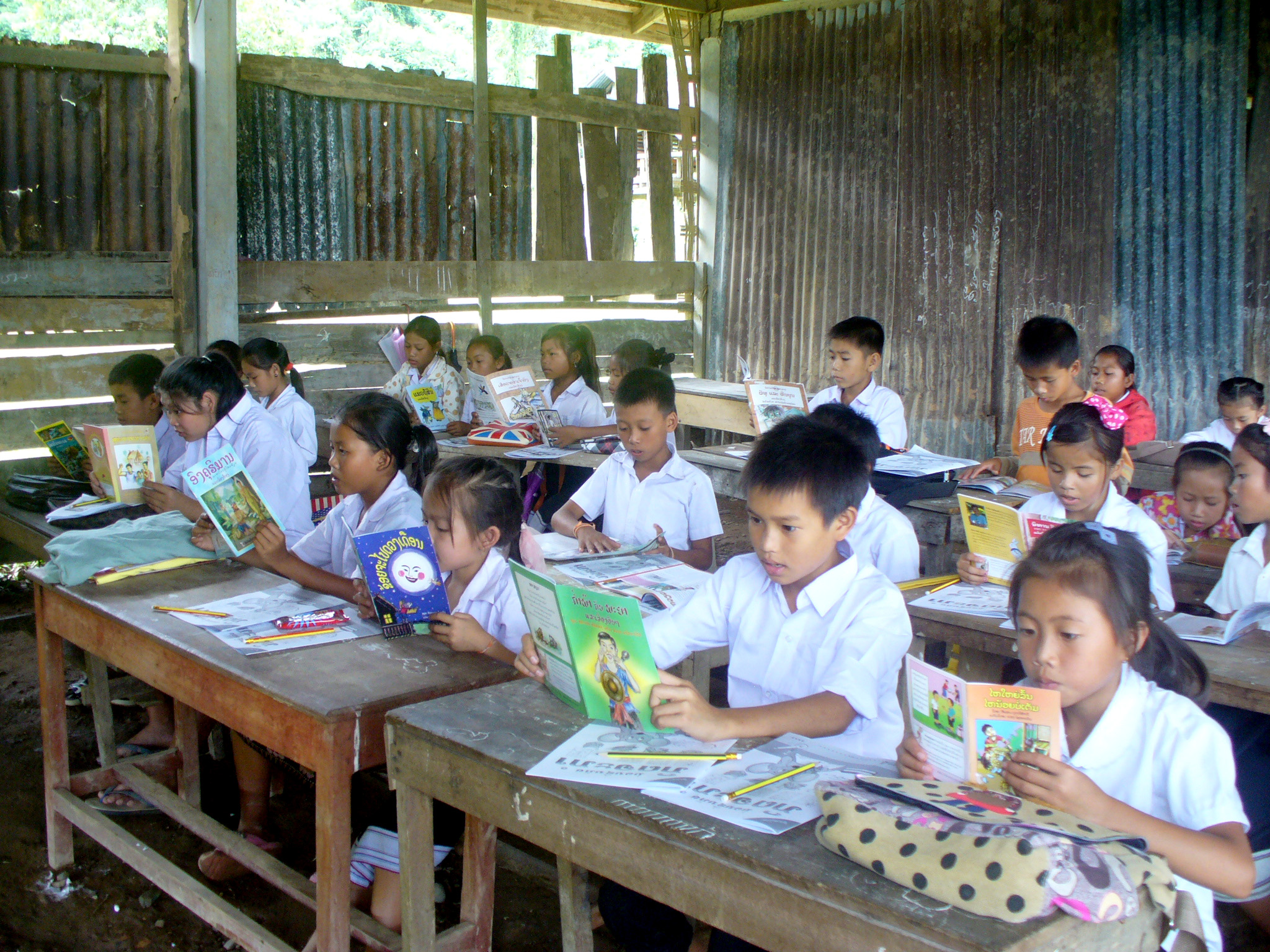
Children reading at a school in Laos

- Abacus
- Educational programming language
- Language education
- Mathematics education
- Origami
- Philosophy for Children
- Physical education
- Reading education
- Reading recovery
- Recess
- Religious education as a school subject
- School corporal punishment
- School discipline
- Science education
- Writing development

=== Elsewhere ===
==== Preschool ====
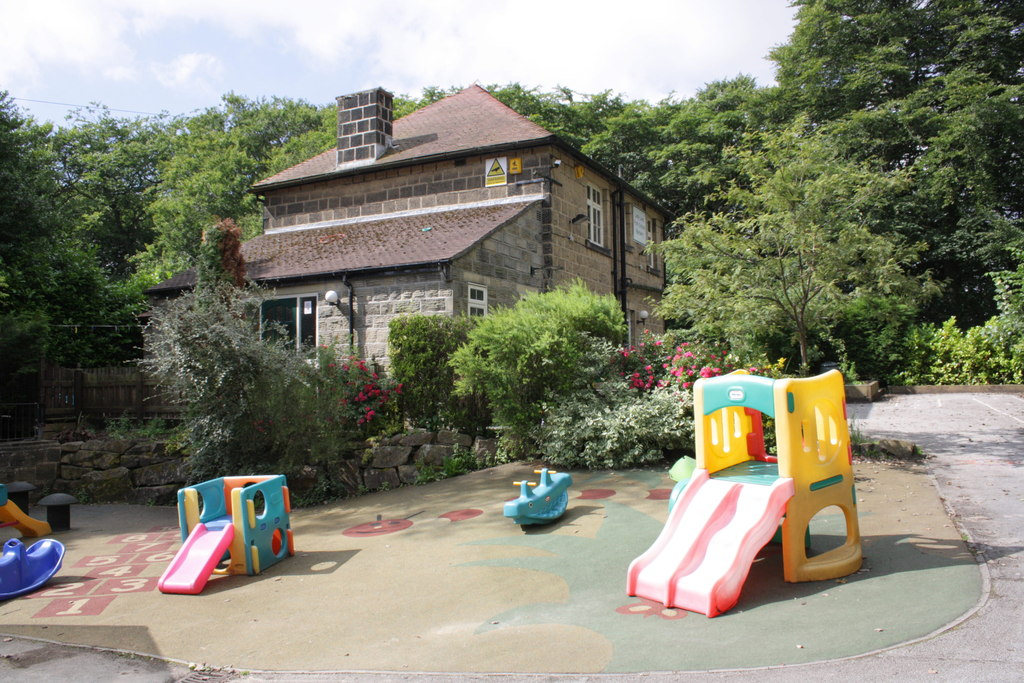
Nursery playground in Bingley, England (2012)

- Early childhood education
- Curricula in early childhood care and education
- Preschool
- Kindergarten
- Forest kindergarten

==== Childcare ====
- Child care
- Babysitting
- Governess
- Nanny
- Au pair

==== Extracurricular and informal ====
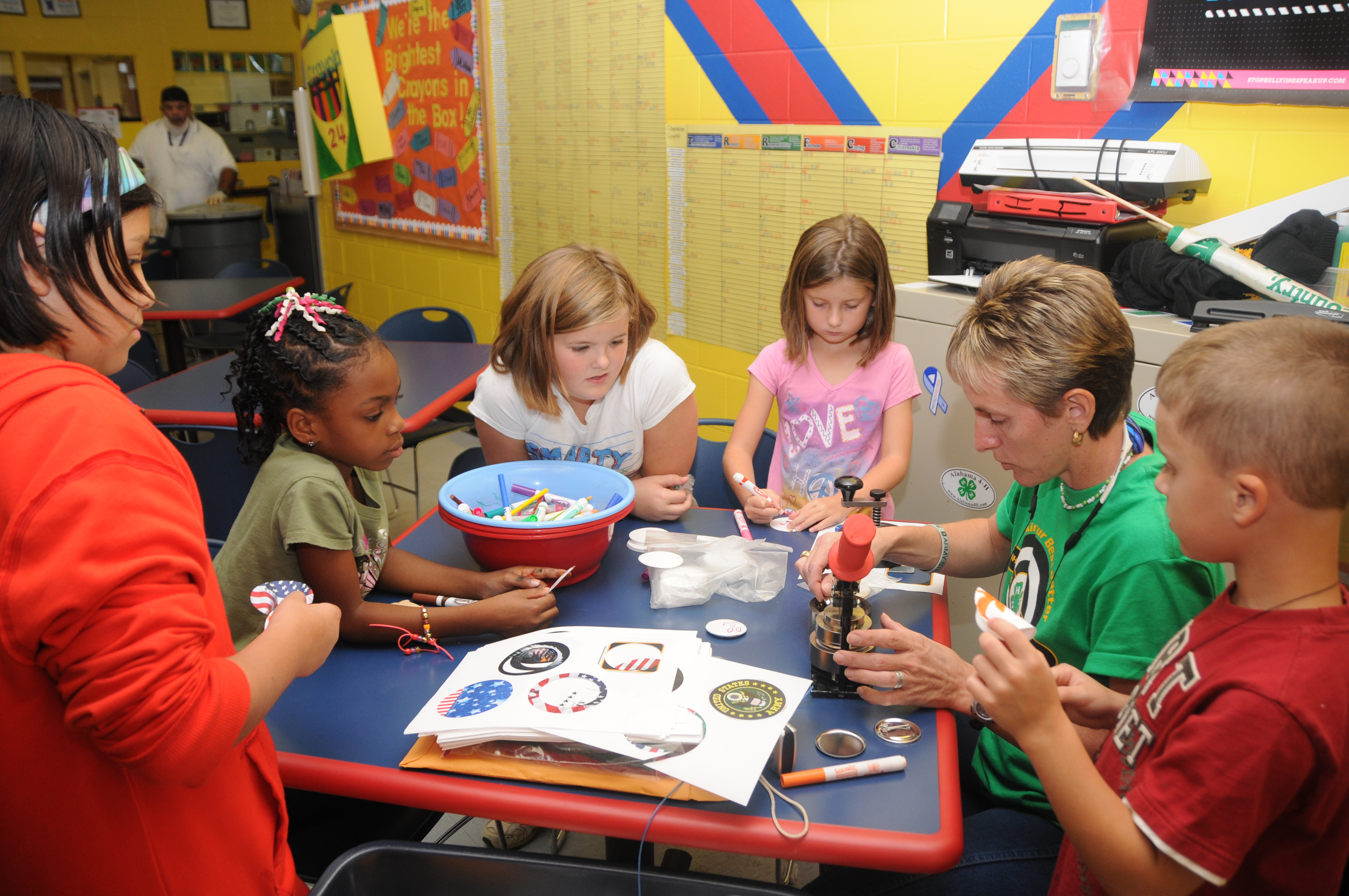
Children doing crafts during an event promoting after-school activities at a youth center linked to Fort Novosel, Alabama

- After-school activity
- Children's street culture
- Extracurricular activity
- Music lesson
- Scouting
- Youth sports
- Youth system
- Unschooling

== Growth and development ==
- Child development
- Nature versus nurture

=== Stages of formative period ===
- Child development stages
- Pregnancy
  - Conception
  - Embryo
  - Fetus
- Infant
  - Childbirth
- Child
  - Early childhood
    - Early Childhood Development
    - Toddler
- Adolescence
  - Preadolescence
  - Puberty
  - Entering Adulthood

=== Aspects ===
==== Social development ====
- A three-month-old infant laughing in response to a caregiver (2012)
  Social emotional development
- Attachment Theory
- Attachment in children
- Child directed speech / Baby talk
- Language development
- Language acquisition
- Speech acquisition
- Babbling
- Baby sign language
- Vocabulary Development
- Mama and papa
- Errors in early word use
- Crib talk
- Stranger Anxiety
- Westermarck effect
- Private speech
- Peer group
- peer pressure
- Friendship
- Imaginary friend
- Child sexuality
- Puppy love

==== Personal care ====
- Breastfeeding
- Baby bottle
- Infant bed
- Infant sleep
- Diaper
- Weaning
- Toilet Training

==== Physical development and growth ====
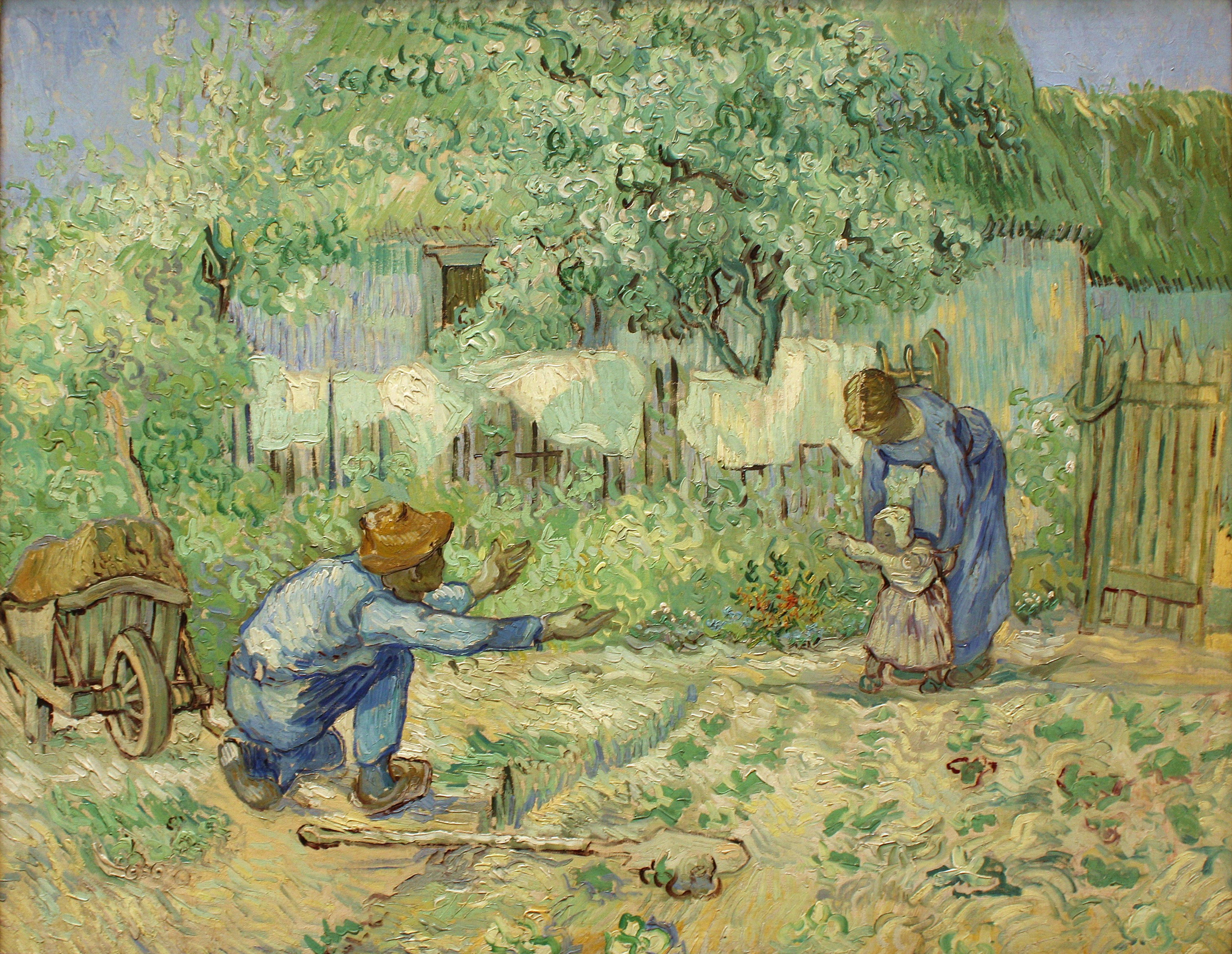
- First Steps, after Millet (1890), painting by Vincent van Goph depicts a young child learning to walk
  Development of the human body
- Growth hormone
- Motor skill
- Gross motor skill
- Crawling (human)
- Fine motor skill
- Childhood development of fine motor skills
- Grasp

==== Intellectual and cognitive development ====
- Cognitive development
- Infant cognitive development
- Object permanence
- Mirror stage
- Comfort object
- Development of the nervous system in humans
- Learning
- Children's use of information
- Moral development
- Happy victimizing
- Theory of mind

=== Complications and divergence ===
==== Innate ====
- Birth defect
- Developmental disorder
- Attachment theory
- Attention deficit disorder
- Attention-deficit hyperactivity disorder
- Autism
- Down syndrome
- Growth hormone deficiency
- Disability
- Intellectual disability
- Physical disability

==== In life ====
- Stillbirth
- Maternal death
- SIDS
- Maternal deprivation
- Infant mortality
- List of childhood diseases and disorders
- Feral child
- Infection in childcare
- Child poverty
- Childhood obesity
- Child prodigy
- Precocious puberty
- Delayed puberty

== Society and Law ==
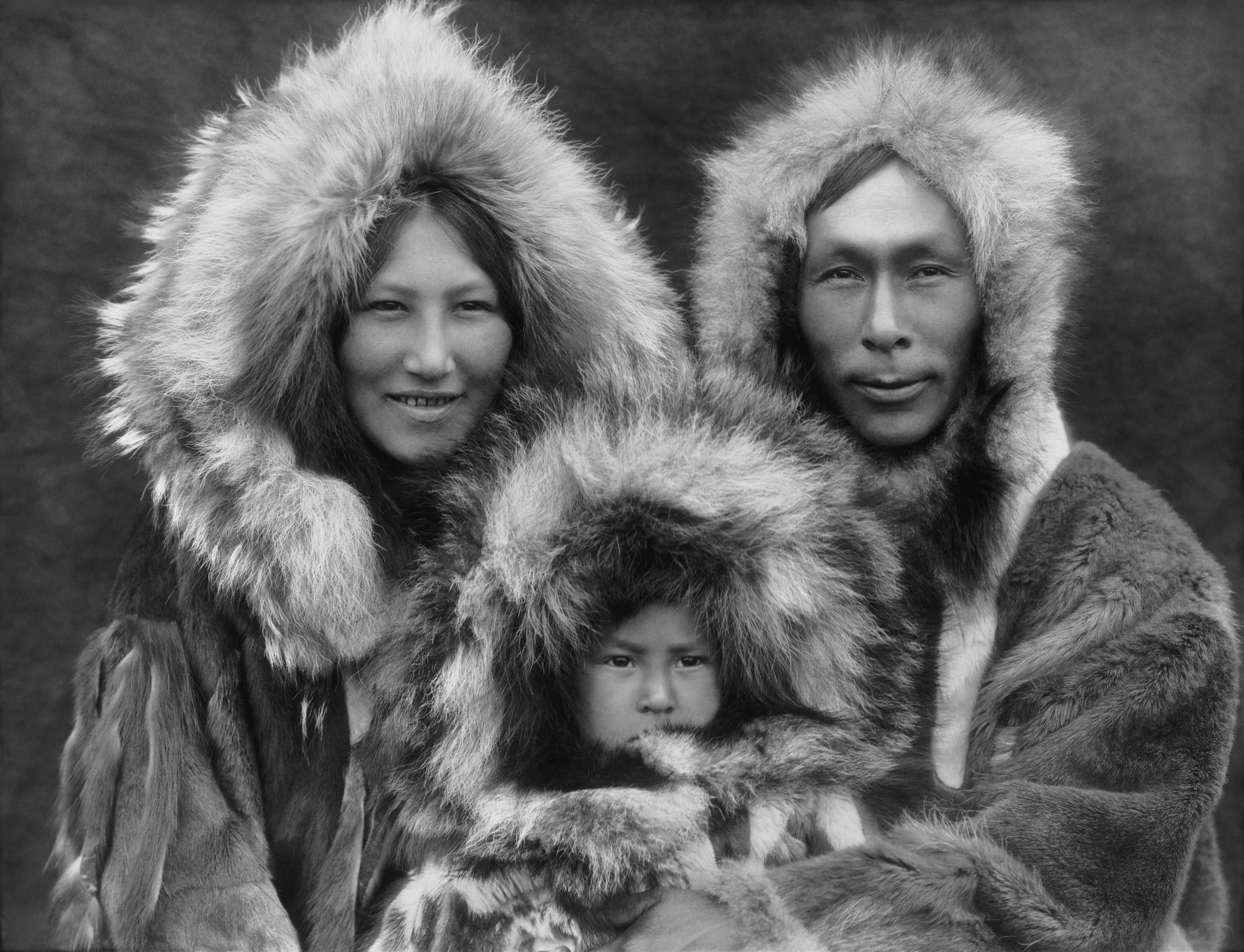
Inupiat Eskimo family in Alaska (1929)

=== Family and guardianship ===
==== Relations ====
- Parent
- Mother
- Father
- Sibling
- Brother
- Sister
- Grandparent
- Aunt
- Uncle
- Cousin
- Extended family
- Stepfamily
- Godparent

==== Concepts ====
- Parenting
- Child custody
- Family law
- Adoption
- Orphan
- Inheritance
- Child support
- Incest taboo
- Surrogate mother
- Fathers' rights
- Illegitimacy
- Divorce
- Best interests
- Morality and legality of abortion
- Sex-selective abortion
- Voluntary childlessness

=== Legal rights, responsibilities and restrictions ===
2000s era PEGI notice indicating that a Video game is unsuitable for children under the age of fifteen

- Age limit
- Age of consent
- Age of criminal responsibility
- Age of majority
- Children's rights movement
- Children's rights education
- Minor (law)
- Voting age
- Youth rights

=== Behaviour management ===
- Child discipline
- Corporal punishment
- Corporal punishment in the home
- Grounding (discipline technique)
- Juvenile delinquency
- Spanking
- Time-out (parenting)
- Young offender
- Youth detention center

=== Child protection and welfare ===
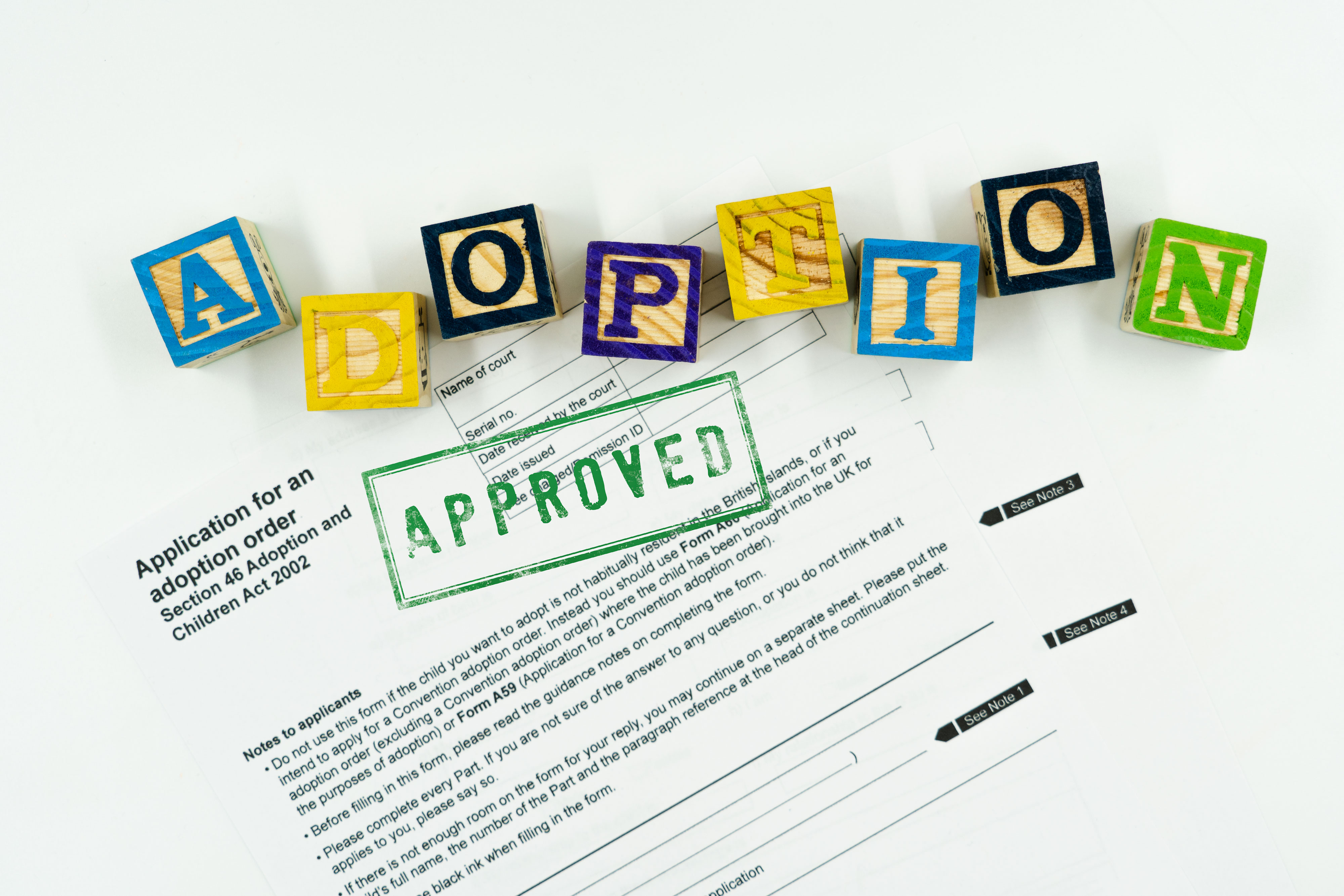
Adoption form used in the United Kingdom or dependant territories (the approved stamp seems to have been added for artistic effect)

- Child and Youth Care
- Child benefit
- Child labour laws
- Child protection
- Parental leave
- Residential care
- Foster care
- Orphanage
- Social services
- UNICEF – the United Nations Children's Fund
- Welfare

== Harm ==
=== Child abuse ===
- Child sexual abuse
- Paedophilia
- Child pornography
- Child abuse
- Child neglect
- Child abandonment
- Child abduction
- Child murder
- Filicide
- Child selling
- Child slavery
- Infanticide
- Military use of children

=== Vulnerable situations and possible abuse ===
- Child marriage
- Child displacement
- Child actor
- Child refugee
- Child labour
- Children in emergencies and conflicts
- Homelessness
- Ephebophilia

== History of children in society ==
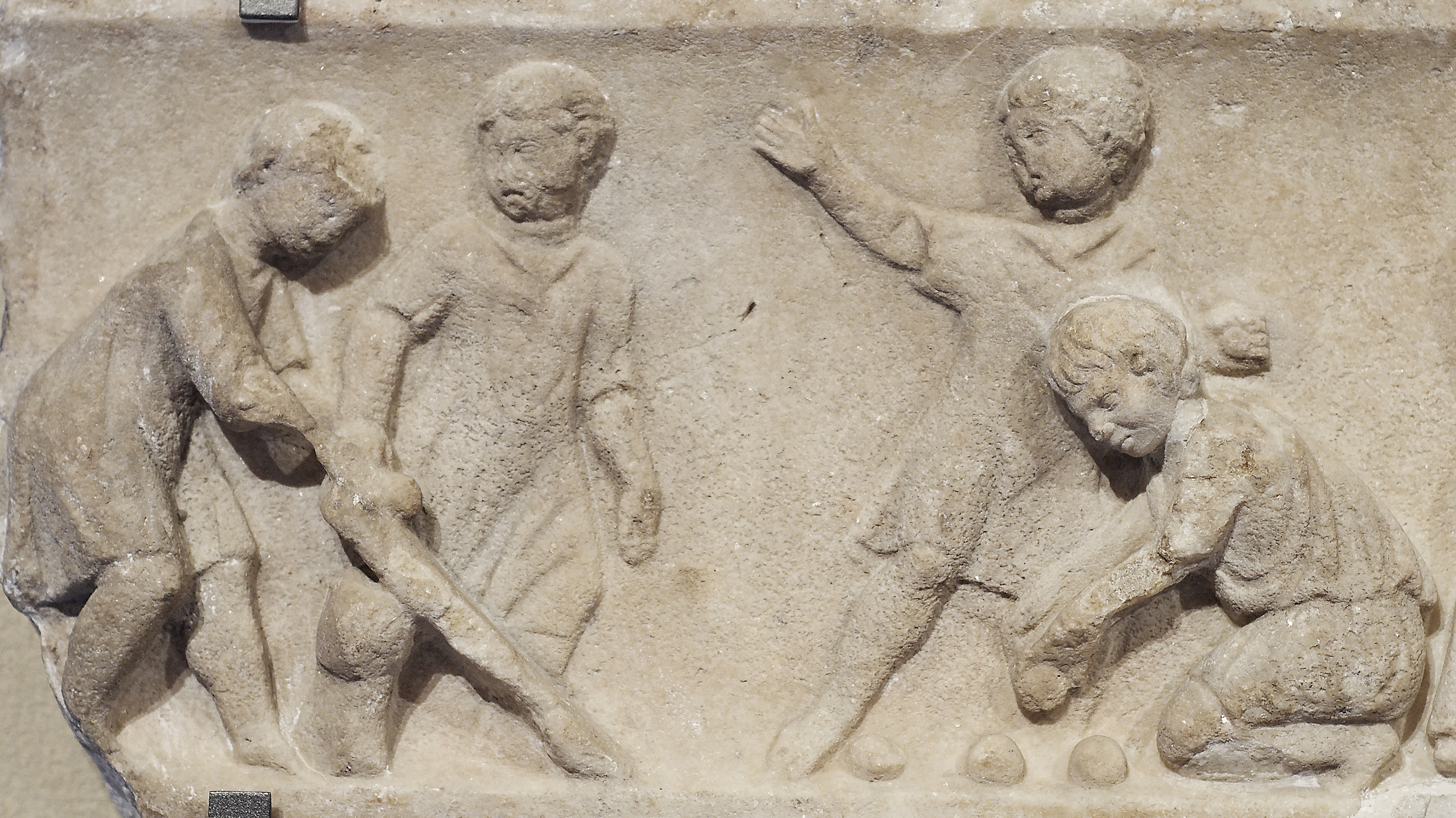
Engraving from the Roman Empire depicts children playing

- History of childhood
- History of children in the military
- History of early childhood care and education
- History of education
- History of the family

=== Specific times and places ===
- Childhood in Maya society
- Childhood in the Viking Age
- Childhood in medieval England
- Childhood in Scotland in the Middle Ages
- Childhood in early modern Scotland
- Stolen Generations
- Effect of World War I on children in the United States
- Children in the Holocaust
- Impact of the COVID-19 pandemic on children

== Children's entertainment and leisure ==
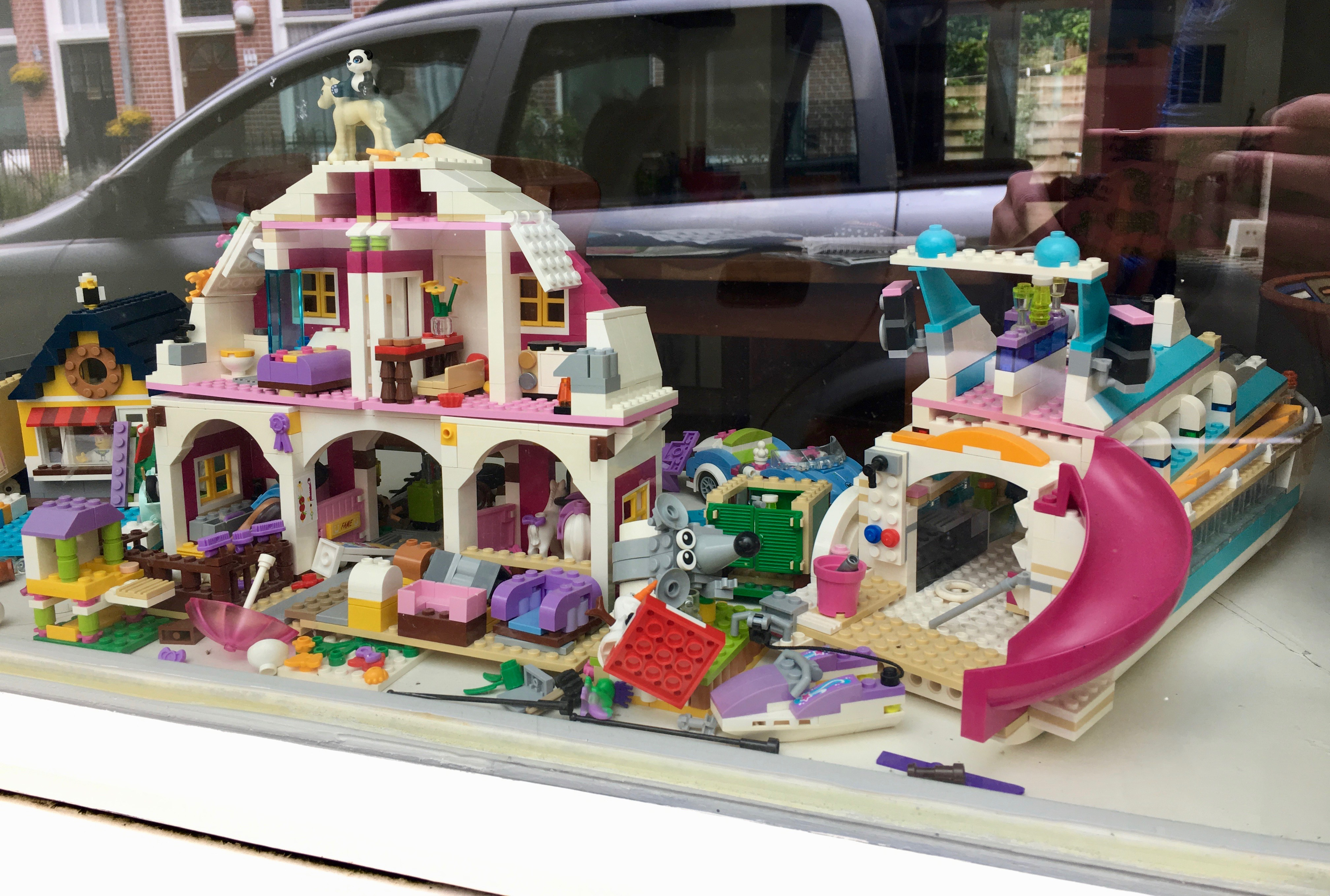
Children's toys displayed in a window in Ultrecht (2017)

=== Media and literature ===
- Advertising to children
- Children's clothing
- Children's culture
- Children's literature
  - Fairy tale
  - Picture book
- Children's film
  - Animation
- Children's music
  - Nursery rhyme
  - Lullaby
- Children's television series

=== Toys and games ===
- Game
- List of children's games
- Play
- Playground
- Toy
- List of toys

== See also ==
- Child harness
- Child safety lock
- The World's Children's Prize for the Rights of the Child
- Piggy bank
- Genetic counseling
- Children's Day
- Student loan
- World Summit for Children
- Childhood studies
- Lina Medina
- List of youth topics
- Term of endearment
