= Childhood in ancient Rome =

Children of ancient Rome

Childbirth in ancient Rome was dangerous for both the mother and the child. Mothers usually would rely on religious superstition to avoid death. Certain customs such as lying in bed after childbirth and using plants and herbs as relief were also practiced. Midwives assisted the mothers in birth. Once children were born they wouldn’t be given a name until 8 or 9 days after their birth. The number depended on if they were male or female. Once the days had passed, the child would be given a name and a bulla during a ceremony. When a child reached the age of 1, they would gain legal privileges which could lead to citizenship. Children 7 and under were considered infants, and were under the care of women. From age 8 until they reached adulthood children were expected to help with housework. The age of adulthood was 12 for girls, or 14 for boys. Children would often have a variety of toys to play with. If a child died they could be buried or cremated. Some would be commemorated in Roman religious tradition.

== Pregnancy and birth ==
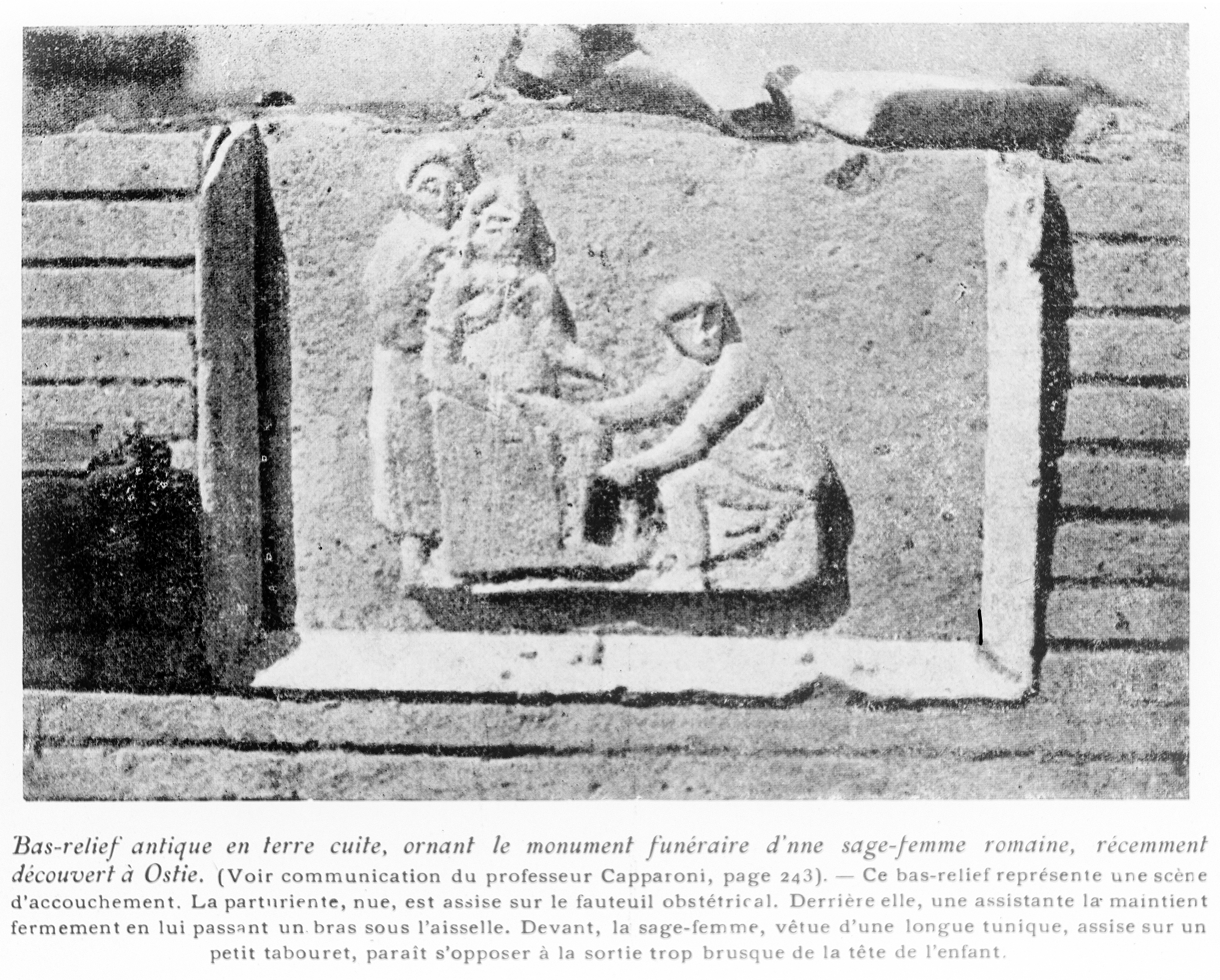
Funeral monument of a Roman midwife

In ancient Rome, childbirth was the aim of a Roman marriage. Procreation was the prime duty and expectation of a woman. Childbirth also brought upon high risk to both the mother and child due to a greater chance of complications, which included infection, uterine hemorrhage, and the young age of the mothers. Women relied mainly on the religious and superstitious practices associated with medicine at this time. After conception, women would rest in bed to “preserve the seed.” To treat pregnancy symptoms they would eat a bland diet of eggs or rice and would be massaged with olive oil. Plants and herbs such as dittany leaves, scordotis in hydromel and the root of verbena were used for relief during labor. Also, methodologies such as a drink powdered with sow’s dung to relieve labor pains and fumes from hyena loin fat or placing the right foot of a hyena on the woman to induce an easy delivery were of use. The development of midwives greatly improved the birthing process for Roman women. Midwives assisted births in the home and prepared the mothers with oil for lubrication, warm water, sponges, and provided bandages for the newborn. During difficult births tools with sharp hooks would be used to extract the baby. Once the baby was born the midwife would cut the umbilical cord, remove the placenta and then they would decide if the child was worth keeping. Once declared fit to live, as a Roman ritual the midwife would place the child on the ground for the head of the household to then raise up and claim it to rear. Various other traditional rites accompanied the birth and were intended to ensure the favour of the gods.

== Naming ==
Infants in ancient Rome were not named until days after they were born (females 8 days, males 9 days) due to a high infant mortality rate. On the 8th or 9th day a gathering would occur consisting of family and friends bearing gifts. Then a sacrifice would be made and the child would then be named and given a bulla to identify him or her as a freeborn.

== Childhood stages ==
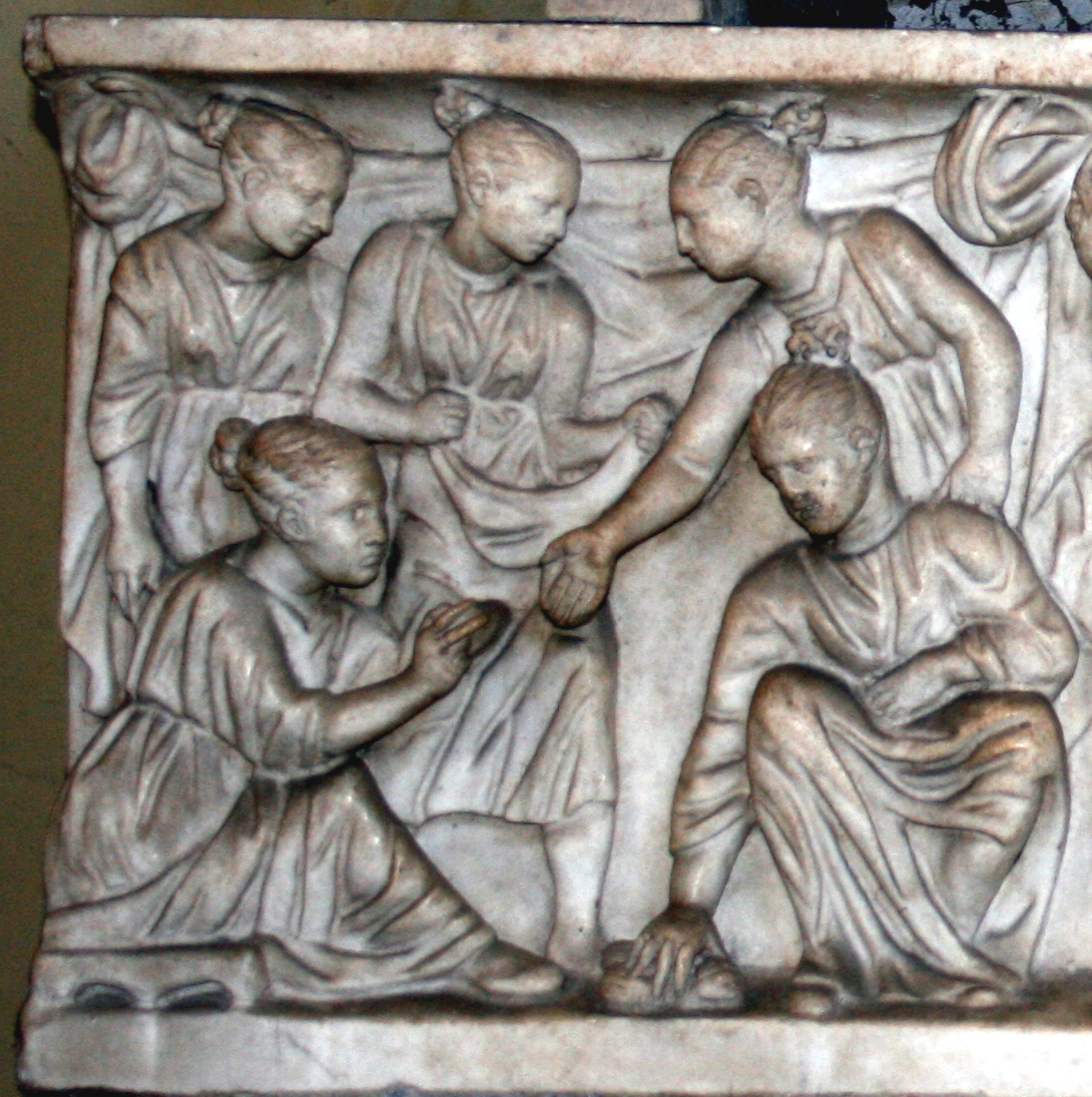
Roman girls playing

From the ages of 8 until the onset of puberty (traditionally 12 for girls and 14 for boys in ancient Rome), children were seen to have more rational minds and were expected to take on responsibility around the home such as taking care of the animals, gathering materials, and general chores around the house. Also during these years, children were considered to be aware of social and sexual roles and children’s groups were organized by gender at that time. At this age Romans knew children were able to understand speech, making them eligible for betrothal. By age 11 children could have social, moral, or criminal responsibility. Under the age of puberty, a child was considered to be doli incapax (incapable of criminal intent). A child between 8 and puberty, however, still had the possibility of being held responsible for a criminal act if it could be proven that they understood their offense. Rome's laws did not use imprisonment or the death penalty for the purpose of criminal punishment generally, and the Valerian and Porcian laws exempted all Roman citizens from degrading and shameful forms of punishment, such as whipping, scourging, or crucifixion; but in the case of theft (for example; furtum), the child and his/her family would be punished by being required to return the stolen object, and in some cases two or four times the value of the stolen object. The age of marriage for girls could be as young as 12, and for boys, as young as 14. By the age they reached puberty, boys underwent a ritual transitioning them into manhood. The ceremony involved them removing their bulla and the tunic they wore through childhood and putting on a man’s toga while accompanied by their fathers and other relatives.

== Relationships ==
In ancient Rome the pater familias held power over the rest of the family. His power over his family would remain until he died or his children were freed from the pater familias. The pater familias was the oldest living male in the family. The ideal mother was called the Roman matrona, a strong and virtuous woman who was dedicated to the political advancement of her family.

== Daily life ==
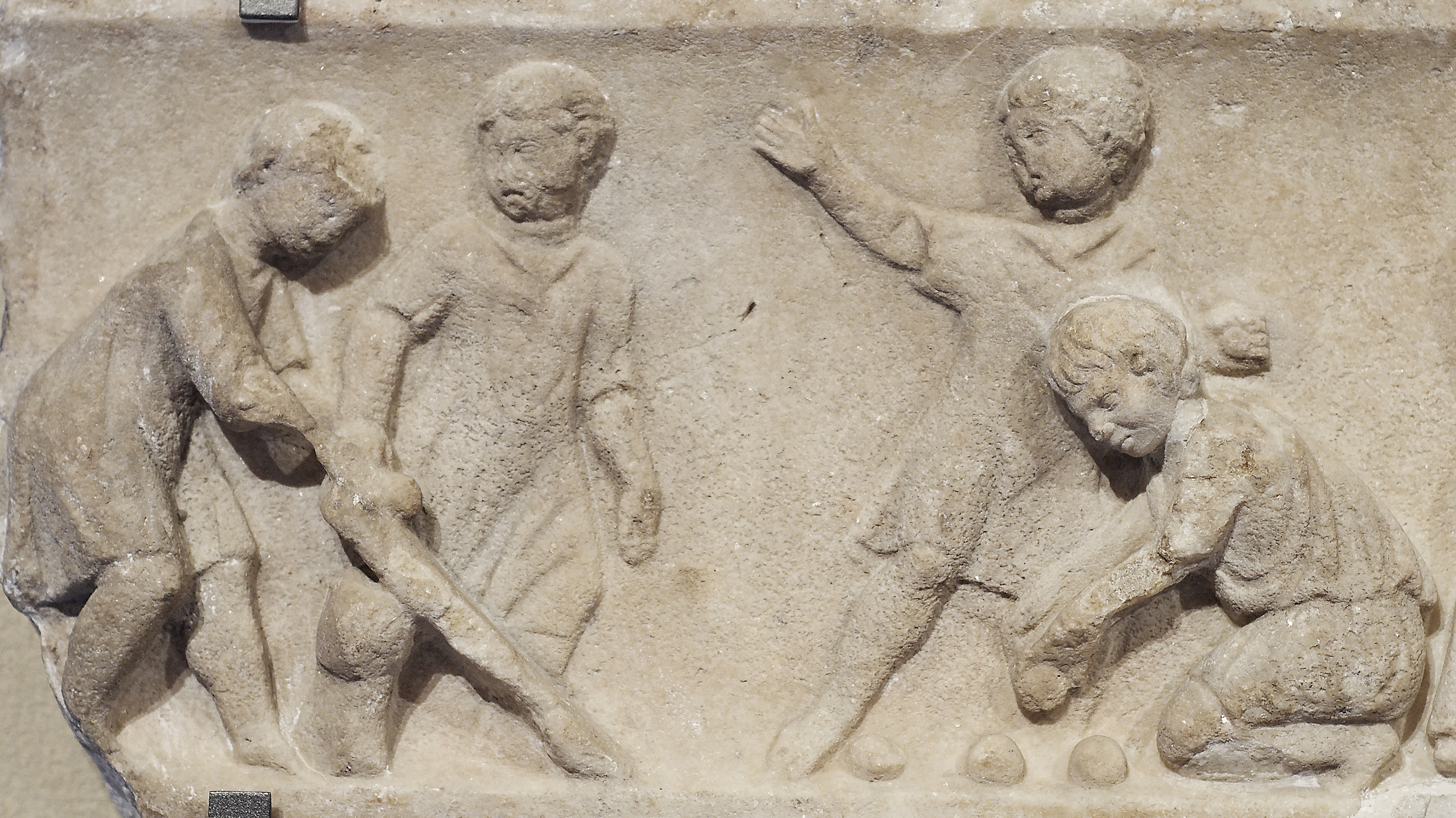
Roman boys playing ball games, 2nd century AD

Roman children had different clothing from adults until they came of age or were married. Children’s education was normally practiced at home. When children were not being educated their play time consisted of a variety of toys such as rattles, dolls made of cloth, clay, or wax, toy weapons, letter blocks, tops, balls and hoops made of sticks. Dogs were also common pets that children played with. Roman children were not allowed to bathe in the Roman baths, instead, they bathed at home.

== Death and burial ==
Due to disease, epidemics, and high mortality in the Roman world, the death of children occurred regularly. Children also participated in the funeral procession after the death of close family members. There are no findings that suggest that children were not present during the required purification of the death of a family member. They were also allowed to participate in Parentalia in February, which was a time to visit the graves and remember the dead.

Children were memorialized on their tombstones, which shows that they were recognized as individuals when they died. However, they had a better chance of being commemorated after surviving infancy. Older children were commemorated in the Roman religious tradition, but babies younger than 40 days old were usually buried instead of cremated. Furthermore, they were often buried within the city walls or under the house, since they were considered not developed enough to negatively impact Roman religion, which required burying corpses outside the city walls. Babies were at a very high risk of death; there was no formal mourning period for an infant less than 1 year old. As children got older their mourning period grew longer until they were 10 years old and had the same mourning period as an adult (10 months).·

== See also ==
- Adoption in ancient Rome
- History of childhood
- Childhood in the Viking Age
- Childhood in medieval England
