= Omne Bonum =

Encyclopedia

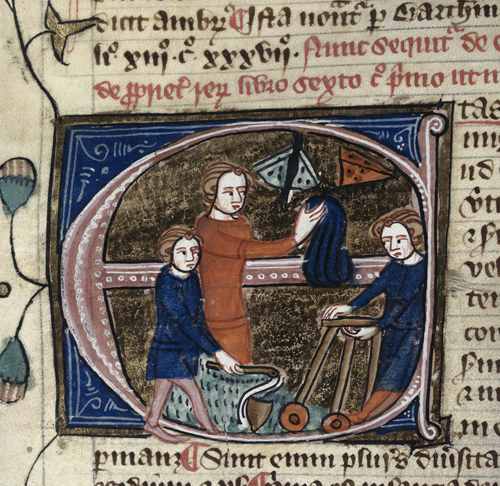
Miniature for the entry etas "age" (Royal MS 6 E VII, fol. 67v) showing children playing with toys and catching butterflies.

Omne Bonum (English: Every Good Thing) is a 14th-century encyclopedia compiled in London by James le Palmer (b. before 1327, d. c. 1375). It survives in four volumes in the British Library (BL Royal 6 E VI and VII). Its author is identified on the basis of a colophon in the same hand in Bodleian Library, Laud Misc. 165 (fol. 585: Iste liber est liber jacobi le palmere quem scripsit manu sua propria deo gratias). James le Palmer was a clerk of the Exchequer mentioned between 1357 and 1375.

The manuscript had the inventory number 1226 in the English Royal Library. It was acquired by the Upper Library at Westminster between 1542 and 1666 and was presented to the British Museum in 1757.

The encyclopedia extends to 1100 folia and includes more than 650 illustrations. Entries cover a variety of topics, including theology, natural history, geography, and historical figures, with a particular interest in canon law. Entries appear in alphabetical order (or at least, grouped by their first letter). Although some form of similar alphabetical arrangement had already been in use in various types of texts since the late twelfth century (see, for example, Thomas of Ireland's Manipulus Florum), Omne Bonum is the earliest surviving encyclopedic work to have alphabetized topics of various subject matters together, rather than employing an overall thematic or hierarchical structure.

The work begins with a preface describing James' motivations in compiling the work: he writes that he has 'compiled the present work with great labour and with unwavering mental striving' for the instruction of those who wish to seek learning and shut out sloth and who desire to occupy themselves with good things. 'In this work,' he says, '[can be found] all good materials heretofore scattered widely both in canon law and in various other books or authoritative volumes . . . [and] without difficulty or tedium all those things that lead to the well-being of every person.' He even claims that his volumes by themselves, if examined diligently, would be sufficient for a person of moderate learning without reference to any other books.

James also uses his preface to list the source materials quoted in his work. In addition to the Vulgate, his key sources include canon laws collections such as the Decretum and their commentators (particularly Hostiensis and 'the Archdeacon' Guido de Baysio); Guillaume Durand's Speculum iudiciale; William of Pagula's Summa summarum; Bartholomeus Anglicus' De proprietatibus rerum; Thomas of Ireland's florilegium Manipulus florum; and the pseudo-Aristotelian Secretum Secretorum. He also cites many common theological and philosophical authorities, including Augustine, Ambrose, Gregory, Aristotle, Cicero, Avicenna, and Averroes.

The work is unfinished, containing only one entry each under the letters N to Z. Royal 6 E VI contains entries for A to D, the first volume of Royal E VII contains E to H, and the final volume contains I to M plus the "single-entry" letters N to Z:

- Royal 6 E VI volume 1 (ff. 1–268): Absolucio–Circumcisio
- Royal 6 E VI volume 2 (ff. 269–562) Circumcisio–Dona Spiritui Sancti
- Royal 6 E VII volume 1 (ff.1–224) Ebrietas–Humanus
- Royal 6 E VII volume 2 (ff. 225–532) Jacob–Zacharias

Sandler (1996) is an extensive treatise from the point of view of art history, including a full catalogue of the entries and illustrations, but the full text of the encyclopedia remains unedited.
