= Focus of infection =

A focus of infection is a place containing whatever epidemiological factors are needed for transmission of an infection. Any focus of infection will have a source of infection, and other common traits of such a place include a human community, a vector population, and environmental characteristics adequate for spreading infection.

== Examples of focus of infection ==
=== Water pump in 1854 London ===
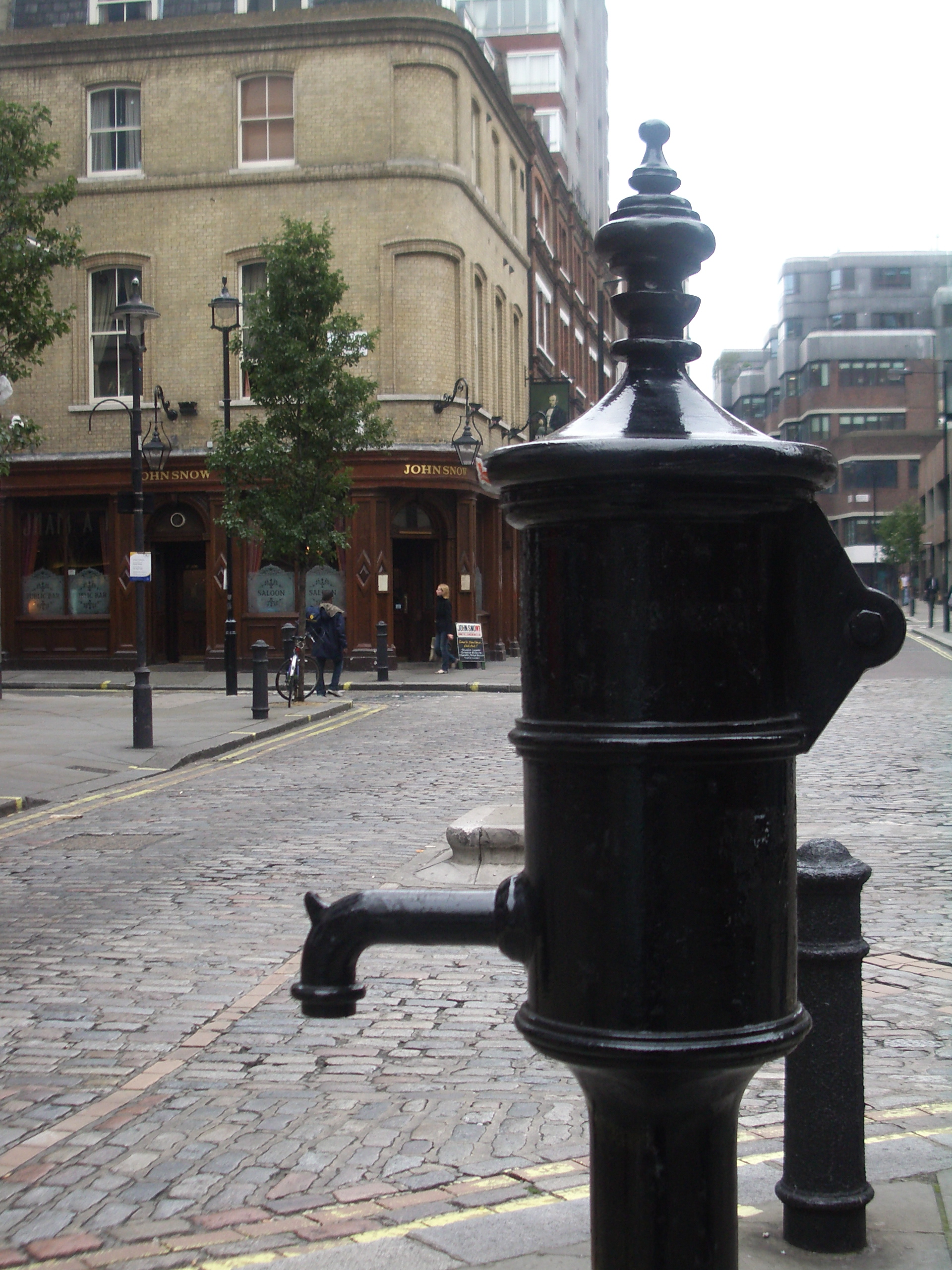
This pump on Broadwick Street is a monument to public health intervention

In 1854 London physician John Snow discovered that people who drank from a particular water pump contracted cholera, and proposed that drinking this water from this pump was the cause of the illness. At the time people did not readily believe germ theory of disease, instead favoring miasma theory. The discovery of the water pump as a source of infection set a precedent which helped establish epidemiology as a science.

=== Gay bathhouses, particularly in 1980s ===
A gay bathhouse is a place where men who have sex with men meet for sex. In the 1980s at the advent of HIV/AIDS many men who used bathhouses for sex developed AIDS as a consequence of their having sex without using safe sex practices for the prevention of HIV/AIDS. Consequently, public health policies found bathhouses to be a place to target for public health intervention.

=== Child daycare ===
Childcare infection is the spread of infection during childcare, typically because of contact among children in daycare or school. This happens when groups of children meet in a childcare environment, and there any individual with an infectious disease may spread it to the entire group. Commonly spread diseases include influenza-like illness and enteric illnesses, such as diarrhea among babies using diapers. It is uncertain how these diseases spread, but hand washing reduces some risk of transmission and increasing hygiene in other ways also reduces risk of infection.
