= Curricula in early childhood care and education =

Curricula in early childhood care and education (ECCE) or early childhood curriculum address the role and importance of curricula in the education of young children, and is the driving force behind any ECCE programme. It is ‘an integral part of the engine that, together with the energy and motivation of staff, provides the momentum that makes programmes live’. It follows therefore that the quality of a programme is greatly influenced by the quality of its curriculum. In early childhood, these may be programmes for children or parents, including health and nutrition interventions and prenatal programmes, as well as centre-based programmes for children.

== Curriculum approaches ==
There is no single curriculum that is ‘best’ for all situations. However, a comparison of different curricula shows certain approaches to be generally more effective than others. For example, High/Scope conducted longitudinal research of children in programmes using three different curriculum models:

- The Direct Instruction model, in which teachers initiated activities using academic goals.
- The traditional Nursery School model, in which teachers responded to activities that children initiated, with a minimum of structure.
- The Reggio Emilia or HighScope model, in which teachers and children both initiated activities. Teachers arranged the room and the daily routine so that children could plan, do and review their activities, while teachers provided support as needed.

By following the pathways over many years of children who began all three programmes, Schweinhart and Weikart determined that the High/Scope model was most effective, and that children in the Direct Instruction model were most likely to have behaviour and social problems later in life. These are significant findings for curriculum designers in both developed and developing nations as the High/Scope model has been adapted for use in countries around the world. Schweinhart and Weikart concluded that the goals of early education should not be limited to academic preparation for school, but should also include helping children learn to make decisions, solve problems and get along with others.

The National Association for the Education of Young Children (NAEYC) has also identified the following indicators of effective curricula:

- Children are active and engaged
- Goals are clear and shared by all
- Evidence-based
- Valued content is learned through investigation, play and focused, intentional teaching
- Builds on prior learning and experiences
- Comprehensive
- Professional standards validate the curriculum’s subject matter
- The curriculum is likely to benefit children

== Curriculum development and implementation ==
=== A cross-sector approach ===
Comprehensive programmes addressing health, nutrition and development have proven to be the most effective in early childhood, especially in programmes at very young and vulnerable children. This requires a genuine commitment from agencies and individuals to work together, to plan projects collaboratively, and to involve parents and communities. At the same time, coordination of a project generally rests with one sector. For curricula, this is typically education, although for very young children the health sector may be better positioned. Yanez comments that a major finding of the Bernard van Leer Foundation is that learning during the first three years should not be the exclusive domain of the education sector. ‘While all sectors must work together, the primary responsibility should be on the health sector, which is better positioned to reach and adapt to the vulnerability of target populations’.

A cross-sector approach is not without challenges. Divergent expectations of key stakeholders, competing demands on their time, lack of trust, inexperience with ECCE and lack of prior experience in working across sectors can demand immense efforts to build a workable platform for collaboration.

=== Adapting versus developing ===
Considerable expertise is required to develop an effective curriculum, one that is not just a collection of activities, but also addresses philosophical and pedagogical concerns.

Adapting a proven, commercially available curriculum can be an acceptable option. However, the philosophy, values and approaches of that curriculum must be suited to the children served by the programme. ‘To make a well-informed choice, staff (and other stakeholders) need to identify their program’s mission and values, consider the research and other evidence about high-quality programs and curricula, and select a curriculum based on these understandings’. Even then, the selected curriculum is likely to require extensive modifications if it is to be effective in the new context. With reference to Hong Kong, Singapore and Shenzhen pre-schools, Li et al. caution that: ‘using Euro-American norms to unify the learning of young children under varying contexts is absolutely an impossible mission. Best pedagogies could be adapted or assimilated into another society but could never be directly transplanted’.

=== Beliefs, values and principles ===
In a multicultural society a diversity of beliefs, values and perspectives emerge. This can create considerable tension and introduce many challenges for curriculum writers. Foremost amongst these is the tension between perceptions of young children as passive learners, dependent on adults for instruction, and perceptions of children as active constructors of their own learning. Proponents of the former generally favour a more academic and prescriptive pre-school curriculum with formal teaching of the alphabet and other basic skills, while those supporting a ‘constructivist’ approach encourage children’s active engagement with materials and people; they support a more open curriculum, with emphasis on offering children diverse opportunities and materials from which they can construct their own learning.

Space can be created in curricula to honour and reflect divergent stakeholder views. For example, children in most indigenous and oral communities learn a lot by listening and watching, and by direct instruction. The skills of reciting, performing and memorisation may be valued and emphasised within some social groups and countries. These can be acknowledged and nurtured within a curriculum, even in one that promotes child-centred, interactive and play-based teaching and learning.

At the national level, the onus is on curriculum writers and the team to explore diversity, to identify common ground and to reach a consensus on what is in the best interests of all children. At the community level, educators need the freedom to follow individual pathways while striving to meet goals based on societal norms and values.

== Curricula for pre-school ==
Curricula for pre-school children have long been a hotbed for debate. Much of this revolves around content and pedagogy; the extent to which academic content should be included in the curriculum and whether formal instruction or child-initiated exploration, supported by adults, is more effective. Proponents of an academic curriculum are likely to favour a focus on basic skills, especially literacy and numeracy, and structured pre-determined activities for achieving related goals. Internationally, there is strong opposition to this type of ECCE curriculum and defence of a broad-based curriculum that supports a child’s overall development including health and physical development, emotional and spiritual well-being, social competence, intellectual development and communication skills. The type of document that emerges from this perspective is likely to be more open, offering a framework which teachers and parents can use to develop curricula specific to their contexts. For example, in Iceland, Hjallastefnan is an early childhood curriculum that organises children in small single-gender groups and uses a gender-compensatory pedagogy to promote equality and broaden children’s social and individual skills.

== Culture-sensitive curricula for pre-school ==
Cultural ideology matters in the development and implementation of curricula for pre-school across cultural settings. Despite the mutual interactions and similarities due to globalization, early childhood curricular policies and practices are still context-specific to a large extent. Therefore, curricula for pre-school should value young learners' cultural backgrounds and emphasize the development of their cultural competence. A fusion of developmental and cultural perspectives will enable educators to promote child agency and positive learning outcomes and to make learning experiences highly relevant to the changing society.

The term of "curriculum hybridization" has been coined by early childhood researchers to describe the fusion of diverse curricular discourses or approaches. The ecological model of curriculum hybridization can be used to explain the cultural conflicts and fusion that may happen in developing or adapting curricula for pre-school.

== Curricula for primary education ==
Teachers are at the core of education and has a key role in nurturing future generations who are not only critical thinkers, but also informed and empowered actors prepared to build peaceful, just and inclusive societies.

Educators and teachers are essential in young people’s lives, and are central to developing students’ knowledge, attitudes and skills and to teach them how to engage in society both constructively and responsibly. This is done through curriculum and pedagogy. Teachers and teacher trainers in formal school settings at the primary school level play a role in strengthening the rule of law RoL and global citizenship through education by integrating it into their lessons and planning.

Such approaches include resources in classrooms, out-of-classrooms and school-family-community engagement.

Classroom resources:

- Short activities and games;
- Single lessons;
- Units or projects;
- Stories and books.

Out-of-classroom resources:

- Sport as a teaching resource to improve self-esteem, enhance social bonds and provide participants with a feeling of purpose;
- Field trips allow students the opportunity to apply their class-based learning more concretely in their own community.

School-family-community engagement resources:

- Support of parents and community members can practise actively shaping a society in which everyone can live peaceful, just, safe and fulfilled lives.

== Developing nations ==
In developing nations, programmes for children under three are more likely to be embedded in community-based programmes in which parents are endorsed as the primary teachers of young children and given support to fulfill that role. These programmes generally cater for ages from pre-birth to school entry with the curriculum having goals for both parents and children. They are often accompanied by a training manual and delivered through participatory workshops and other negotiated and community-based activities. Apart from strengthening the role of parents, these programmes respond to gaps that have persisted in the developing world despite global attention to ECCE; i.e. a focus on under threes and servicing the most marginalised children and families. While some incorporate weekly activities for older pre-school children – such as A New Day for Kids (ANDK) in Cambodia – they are not a substitute for a pre-school programme with a trained teacher who has the skills to plan and implement an effective curriculum. This is an important ingredient in high-quality ECCE programmes for pre-school-aged children.

== Emergent literacy ==
Emergent literacy is the idea of how young children's skills of literacy and composing begin to develop before they start traditional schooling, such as pre-K. What used to be a controversial topic due to the stigma around exposing children to reading and writing before proper education has now become an emerging topic of research to improve early schooling curricula. This idea was originally introduced by researcher, Marie Clay. Clay's research led to the production of a research journal by Teale, Sulzby, and other researchers that were the face of emergent literacy research at the time.

Emergent literacy ties into school learning because this development phase impacts the learning that occurs during formal schooling. During the emergent literacy phase, children learn about "print", through everyday situations such as looking at books or words. Overtime, they begin to see patterns and recognize letters. This knowledge is what helps prepare children to get ready to formally learn how to read and write in school. Furthermore, research has found that children write by drawing "print" and that progress in drawing "print" is essentially what makes their "writing" look more "writing-like".

Knowing this, many researchers are looking for ways to design curricula that will support growth in the emergent literacy phase of development. However, because research in emergent literacy is varied due to the different types of skills children develop during this phase, research around it is also very widely skewed. Different curricula with different approaches to literacy and writing in children are being proposed and implemented.

== See also ==
- Childhood pedagogy
- Early childhood education
- History of childhood care and education
- Curriculum development
- Emergent Literacies

== Sources ==
This article incorporates text from a free content work. Licensed under CC-BY-SA IGO 3.0 (license statement/permission). Text taken from Investing against Evidence: The Global State of Early Childhood Care and Education (2015), 243-265, Marope, P.T.M., Kaga, Y., UNESCO. UNESCO.

This article incorporates text from a free content work. Licensed under CC BY-SA 3.0 IGO. Text taken from Empowering students for just societies: a handbook for primary school teachers, UNESCO, UNESCO. UNESCO.
