= Childhood in Scotland in the Middle Ages =

Childhood mortality was high in medieval Scotland as it was in all of medieval Europe. The archaeology of burial sites suggests that childhood illness were common. Many individuals in Scottish urban society were affected by childhood disease and accidents that significantly affected their life chances. Wet-nursing had become common by the fifteenth century. Fosterage was common among Highland clan leaders. From the age of three children took part in imaginative play and more formal games such as football, golf, archery, and various bowling games. The rich may have taken part in hunting and hawking and there is evidence from the sixteenth century of bear-baiting, cock-fighting and dog fighting.

In Gaelic society there were schools for bards and after the introduction of Christianity schools developed as part of monasteries and other religious institutions. There were also petty schools, more common in rural areas and providing an elementary education. By the end of the fifteenth century, Edinburgh also had "sewing schools" for girls. The growing emphasis on education culminated with the passing of the Education Act 1496. Boys wanting to attend universities had to go abroad until the founding of three Scottish universities in the fifteenth century. The majority of children did not attend school. In the families of craftsmen they might become apprentices or journeymen. In Lowland rural society many probably left home to become domestic and agricultural servants. By the late medieval era, Lowland society was probably part of the north-west European marriage model, of life-cycle service and late marriage.

== Birth and infancy ==
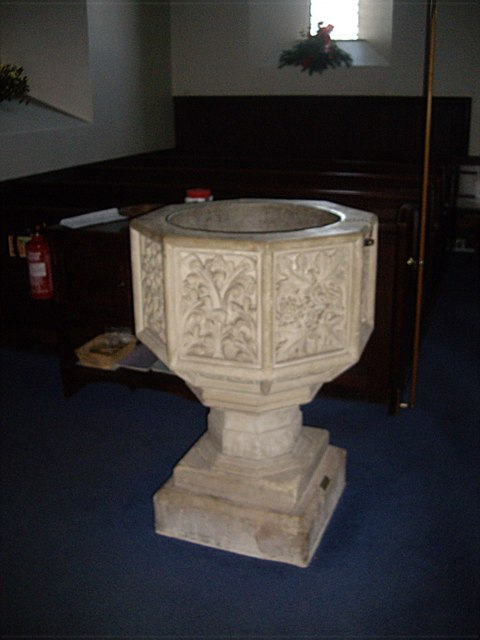
Stone font in St Ternan's Church, Banchory

Childhood mortality was high in Medieval Scotland. Children were often baptised rapidly, by laymen and occasionally by midwives, because of the belief that children that died unbaptised would be dammed. It was more normally undertaken in a church and was a means of creating wider spiritual kinship with godparents.

Cemeteries may not represent a cross section of medieval society, but in one Aberdeen burial site 53 per cent of those buried were under the age of six and in one Linlithgow cemetery it was 58 per cent. The diseases that are easiest to spot in the archaeological record are those that caused a "metabolic insult" evident in surviving bones and teeth. These were common in children up until about the age of four. These may have been due to increased risk from disease once the protective antibodies in a mother's milk ended after weaning. There was also greater exposure to hard and soft tissue trauma, and subsequent infection, as children became more mobile by crawling and toddling. Iron deficiency anaemia was common among children, probably caused by long-term breastfeeding by mothers that were themselves deficient in minerals. Common childhood diseases included measles, diphtheria and whooping-cough, while parasites were also common. The most badly affected individuals rarely made it beyond the age of 25, thus many individuals in Scottish urban society were affected by childhood disease and accidents that significantly affected their life chances.

In Lowland noble and wealthy society by the fifteenth century the practice of wet-nursing had become common. In Highland society there was a system of fosterage among clan leaders, where boys and girls would leave their parents' house to be brought up in that of other chiefs, creating a fictive bond of kinship that helped cement alliances and mutual bonds of obligation. "Rait's Raving", a poem by a fifteenth-century gentleman, describes young children up to the age of three as only concerned with food, drink and sleep.

== Play ==
"Rait's Raving" indicates how from the age of three to seven children began to play. Surviving artifacts include small millstones from the later Iron Age or early Middle Ages, found in Shetland and the mainland, that may be children's toys. There are also games counters and model swords. "Rait's Raving", attempts to persuade the author's son that tables, cards and dice were only fit for children, suggesting that these were played by the young. It also describes children gathering flowers, building houses with sticks, using sticks and reeds as swords and spears, "making a white horse of a wand", creating what would later be known as a hobby horse, and imaginative play in which pieces of bread were sailing ships, while girls could make dolls from scraps and flowers. Sports known to be played in late medieval Scotland included football, golf, archery, and various bowling games, known as "laing bowlis", "pennystanes", and "kyles" or skittles. "Caich", a form of tennis, was played by two individuals or teams, bouncing a ball against a smooth wall, often a church. The rich may have taken part in hunting and hawking and there is evidence from the sixteenth century of bear-baiting, cock-fighting and dog fighting.

== Education ==
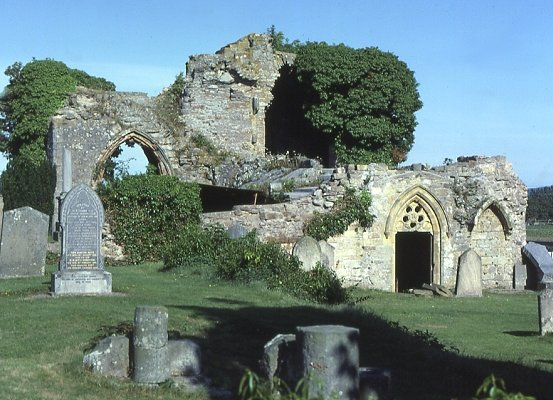
The ruins of Kinloss Abbey, one of the ecclessiastical institutions which opened their doors to a wider range of students in the late Middle Ages

In the Early Middle Ages, Scotland was overwhelmingly an oral society and education was verbal rather than literary. After the "de-gallicisation" of the Scottish court from the twelfth century, an order of bards took over the functions of poets, musicians and historians, often attached to the court of a lord or king, and passing on their knowledge in Gaelic to the next generation. They would continue to act in a similar role in the Highlands and Islands into the eighteenth century. They often trained in bardic schools, of which a few, like the one run by the MacMhuirich dynasty, who were bards to the Lord of the Isles, existed in Scotland and a larger number in Ireland, until they were suppressed from the seventeenth century.

The establishment of Christianity brought Latin to Scotland as a scholarly and written language. Monasteries served as major repositories of knowledge and education, often running schools and providing a small educated elite, who were essential to create and read documents in a largely illiterate society. In the High Middle Ages new sources of education arose, with song and grammar schools. These were usually attached to cathedrals or a collegiate church and were most common in the developing burghs. By the end of the Middle Ages grammar schools could be found in all the main burghs and some small towns. Early examples including the High School of Glasgow in 1124 and the High School of Dundee in 1239. There were also petty schools, more common in rural areas and providing an elementary education. Some monasteries, like the Cistercian abbey at Kinloss, opened their doors to a wider range of students. The number and size of these schools seems to have expanded rapidly from the 1380s. They were almost exclusively aimed at boys, but by the end of the fifteenth century, Edinburgh also had schools for girls, sometimes described as "sewing schools", and probably taught by lay women or nuns. There was also the development of private tuition in the families of lords and wealthy burghers. The growing emphasis on education culminated with the passing of the Education Act 1496, which decreed that all sons of barons and freeholders of substance should attend grammar schools to learn "perfyct Latyne". All this resulted in an increase in literacy, but which was largely concentrated among a male and wealthy elite, with perhaps 60 per cent of the nobility being literate by the end of the period.

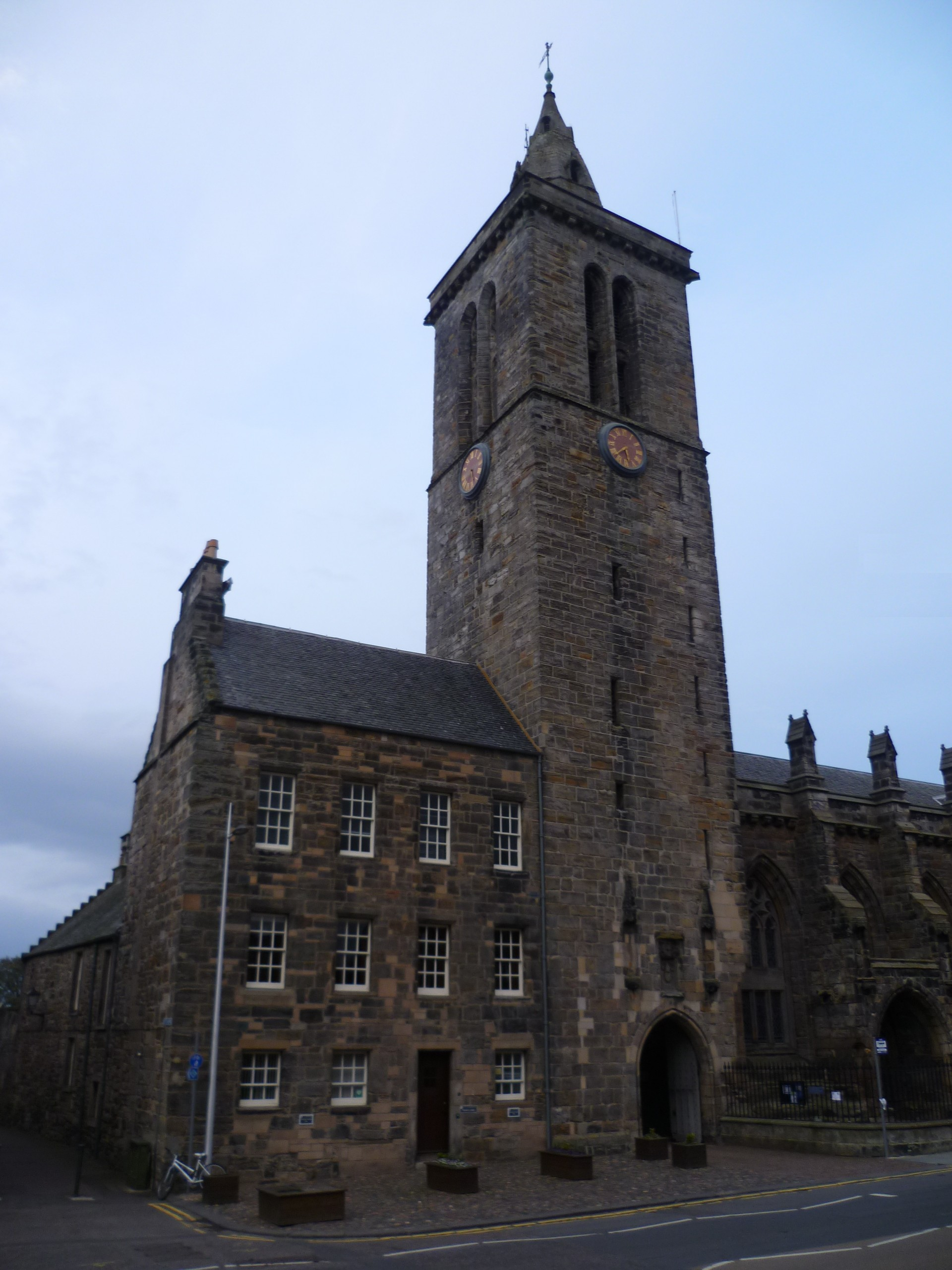
Tower of St Salvator's College, St Andrews, one of the three universities founded in the fifteenth century

In the Middle Ages, boys entering university did so younger than now, at about the age of 15 or 16. Until the fifteenth century, those who wished to attend university had to travel to England or the continent, and just over a 1,000 have been identified as doing so between the twelfth century and 1410. After the outbreak of the Wars of Independence, with occasional exceptions under safe conduct, English universities were closed to Scots and continental universities became more significant. Some Scottish scholars became teachers in continental universities. This situation was transformed by the founding of the University of St Andrews in 1413, the University of Glasgow in 1451 and the University of Aberdeen in 1495. Initially these institutions were designed for the training of clerics, but they would increasingly be used by laymen who would begin to challenge the clerical monopoly of administrative posts in the government and law. Those wanting to study for second degrees still needed to go elsewhere and Scottish scholars continued to visit the continent and English universities, which reopened to Scots in the late fifteenth century.

== Youth ==
The majority of children, even in urban centres where opportunities for formal education were greatest, did not attend school. In the families of craftsmen children probably carried out simpler tasks. They might later become apprentices or journeymen. In Lowland rural society, as in England, many young people, both male and female, probably left home to become domestic and agricultural servants, as they can be seen doing in large numbers from the sixteenth century. By the late medieval era, Lowland society was probably part of the north-west European marriage model, of life-cycle service and late marriage, usually in the mid-20s, delayed by the need to acquire the resources needed to be able to form a household.

== See also ==
- Childhood in early modern Scotland
- Childhood in medieval England
- Childhood in the Viking Age
