= Thomas of Ireland =

Irish writer (1295–1338)

Thomas of Ireland (fl. 1295 – before 1338), also known as Thomas Hibernicus, Thomas Palmeranus, or Thomas Palmerstonus, was an Irish anthologist and indexer.

== Life ==
Thomas was a Fellow of the College of Sorbonne and a Master of Arts by 1295, and referred to as a former fellow in the first manuscripts of his Manipulus in 1306. He is believed to have died before 1338.

Lampen, a Franciscan, argues that Thomas Palmeranus, Thomas Hibernicus and Thomas Palmerstonus are the same person.

== Works ==
=== Manipulus florum ===
Thomas was the author of three short works on theology and biblical exegesis, and the compiler of the Manipulus florum ('A Handful of Flowers'). The latter, a Latin florilegium, has been described as a "collection of some 6,000 extracts from patristic and a few classical authors". Thomas compiled this collection from books in the library of the Sorbonne, "and at his death he bequeathed his books and sixteen pounds Parisian to the college".

The Manipulus florum survives in over one hundred and ninety manuscripts, and was first printed in 1483. It was printed twenty-six times in the 16th century, eleven times in the 17th. As late as the 19th century, editions were published in Vienna and Turin.

Although Thomas was apparently a member of the secular clergy, his anthology was highly successful because it was "well suited to the needs of the new mendicant preaching orders ... [to] ... locate quotations ... relevant to any subject they might wish to touch on in their sermons." Indeed, Boyer has demonstrated that very soon after the Manipulus was completed a French Dominican used it to compose a series of surviving sermons. However, Nighman has argued that, although it was surely used by preachers, Thomas did not actually intend his anthology as a reference tool for sermon composition, as argued by the Rouses, but rather as a learning aid for university students, especially those intending on a clerical career involving pastoral care. Nighman has also demonstrated its reception in several non-sermon texts, including Walter Bower's Scotichronicon.

Thomas was also among the earliest pioneers of medieval information technology that included alphabetical subject indices and cross-references. "In his selection, and in the various indexing techniques he invented or improved on, he revealed true originality and inventiveness." Those finding tools are preserved, and electronically enhanced, in Nighman's online critical edition of the Manipulus florum.

=== Other works ===
Thomas was also the author of three other works:

1. De tribus punctis religionis Christiane ('On the three main points of the Christian religion'), on the duties of secular clergy;
2. De tribus hierarchiis ('On the three hierarchies'), which develops ideas about hierarchy expressed at the end of De tribus punctis; and
3. De tribus sensibus sacre scripture ('On the three senses of holy scripture'), on the four senses of Scripture. The last two works survive in three and eight manuscripts respectively.

== References and further reading ==
- Hauréau, B., "Thomas d’Irlande." In Histoire littéraire de la France 30. Paris, 1888. pp. 398–408.
- Clark, James G. (2004). "Hibernicus, Thomas (c.1270–c.1340)". Oxford Dictionary of National Biography (online ed.). Oxford University Press. doi:10.1093/ref:odnb/27206. (Subscription or UK public library membership required.)
- J. Hamesse, M.J. Jiménez, C. Nighman (eds.), New perspectives on Thomas of Ireland's Manipulus florum/Nouvelles perspectives sur le Manipulus florum de Thomas d'Irlande, Papers in Mediaeval Studies 32, Toronto: Pontifical Institute of Mediaeval Studies, 2019. https://pims.ca/publication/isbn-978-0-88844-832-3/
- Lampen OFM, Willibrord, "Thomas Palmeranus." In Lexikon für Theologie und Kirche, Freiburg, 1965. vol. 10; col. 146.
