= Hjallastefnan =

Icelandic educational approach

Hjallastefnan (Hjalli model)
- Hjallastefnan
- Founded: 1989
- Founder: Margrét Pála Ólafsdóttir
- Type: Educational organisation and pedagogy
- Headquarters: Iceland
- Website: www.hjallimodel.com

Hjallastefnan (often rendered in English as the Hjalli model) is an Icelandic educational approach used mainly in early childhood and primary education. The model aims to promote gender equality by teaching in small, single-gender groups and by using a compensatory pedagogy that deliberately cultivates under-developed qualities in each child.

== History and Approach ==
Educator Margrét Pála Ólafsdóttir developed the approach in the late 1980s and opened the first Hjalli preschool in Hafnarfjörður in 1989. During the 1990s and 2000s, the model expanded within Iceland, including into primary schooling under the name ''Barnaskóli Hjallastefnunnar'' (Hjalli Primary School). According to the organisation, Hjalli Ltd currently operates 14 kindergartens and three elementary schools in Iceland.

Hjallastefnan uses small, largely single-gender groups and classroom routines intended to broaden pupils’ behavioural repertoires, while the organisation describes this as a form of compensatory pedagogy. Classrooms emphasise minimalist environments, uniforms to reduce status signalling and create belonging, and open-ended materials (e.g. blocks, paper, sand, water) to spur creativity and collaboration.

== Research and Reception ==
Hjallastefnan has been a major independent provider within broader private marketisation in Icelandic early education system. From its inception, the approach has attracted both support and controversy, particularly over gender segregation and uniforms. Critics have argued that the programme has not evolved sufficiently and that attention to gender issues is not unique to Hjalli, while supporters contend that temporary separation enables targeted, compensatory work that reduces stereotypes when groups come together.

Lower measured noise levels and fewer voice symptoms have also been reported among teachers in a Hjalli-model preschool compared with public preschools, attributing differences to discipline and structure in activities.

== See also ==
- Single-sex education
- Early childhood education
- Gender and education
