= Childhood in the Viking Age =

In Viking Age Scandinavia, boys were legally considered to be adults at age 15. But before they reached adulthood, they had a childhood spent learning the skills they would need to be successful. Viking children were primarily raised by their mothers, although sometimes Viking boys lived with another family for a period of time as a foster child. This was meant to forge bonds between the two families and entitled the boy to help from his foster family, as well as his birth family. It also bound him to them and they often remained close through the life of the boy.

== Education ==
Even after the conversion of Scandinavia to Christianity, formal education was rare for Scandinavian children, as schools were few and far between. Instead, most children were educated within and around the home, by helping out with chores around the house. These chores were shared and children learned by doing them to the best of their ability. Particularly talented children might have been sent off to another house to better learn a specific skill, such as metallurgy, which might not have been done at home. Even skills such as fighting were taught in an informal setting, with most children honing their skills by practice fighting other children, and perhaps a nearby adult. Above all, young people were expected to remain honorable and work hard. Hard work was a value impressed on children from a young age, and those who were deemed as lazy were mockingly called “charcoal chewers”- a term which referred to their staying at home by the cooking hearth while everyone else was hard at work in the fields.

== Agency ==
Viking Age children were often granted freedom and agency to do as they wished, so long as it did not damage the honor of the family. Sons were allowed to choose their own life path-whether they wanted to be a farmer, a warrior, a trader, etc. and daughters usually had a say in who they were to marry, despite marriage largely being a matter of negotiation between families.

== Inheritance ==
Both sons and daughters could inherit from their parents, although inheritance often went to a son over a daughter. Daughters could claim inheritance if no sons were born, and had claim over their uncles and grandparents.

The children of slave women and concubines could also receive inheritance, although the amount they received from their fathers was likely very little if they had not been legally adopted by their father. Likely, they would receive more in practice than the law granted them (usually just a few paltry tokens) but they fared better if legally adopted. Fortunately, they often were and many illegitimate sons inherited their father's land and wealth. This even holds true in the royal family, where multiple illegitimate sons have inherited the throne.

== Fun and Games ==
Scandinavian children in the Viking Age likely took part in a variety of leisure activities, including boating, swimming, racing, wrestling, and board games such as chess and hnefatafl. They could also watch adult activities like horse fighting, or listen to stories and poems, such as the epic poems characteristic of Viking literature.

== See also ==
- Childhood in medieval England
- Childhood in Scotland in the Middle Ages
- Childhood in early modern Scotland

== Sources ==
- Graham-Campbell, James, and Dafydd Kidd. The Vikings. Great Britain: British Museum Publications, 1980. Print. [3]
- Sawyer, Birgit, and P. H. Sawyer. Medieval Scandinavia: From Conversion to Reformation, circa 800-1500. Minneapolis: U of Minnesota, 1993. Print. [1]
- Simpson, Jacqueline. Everyday Life in the Viking Age. London: Batsford, 1967. Print. [2]
