= Childhood in medieval England =

Social construct

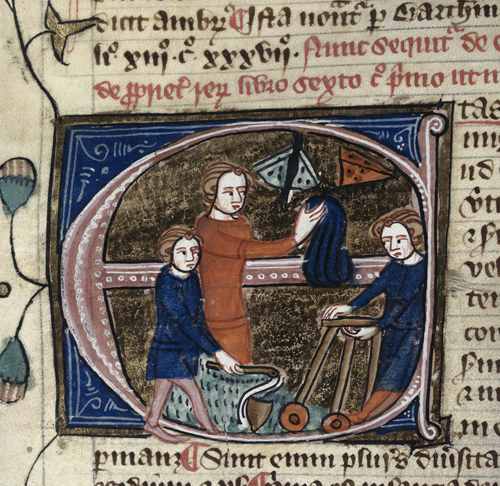
Miniature for the entry etas "age" in the Omne Bonum encyclopedia (London, 14th century, BL Royal MS 6 E vii, fol. 67v) showing children playing with toys and catching butterflies.

In medieval England, according to common law, childhood ranged from the birth of a child until he or she reached the age of 12. At this point, the child was seen as capable and competent to understand his or her actions, thus rendering them responsible for themself. According to canon law, girls could marry at the age of 12 and boys at the age of 14.

== The first year ==
In Medieval England the first year of life was one of the most dangerous, with as many as 50 percent of children succumbing to fatal illness. During this year the child was cared for and nursed, either by parents (if the family belonged to the peasant class) or (perhaps) by a wet nurse if the child belonged to a noble class.

== Ages seven to eleven ==
At age seven play was still an important part of the child's life; however, as the child's ability to learn and fulfil family duties grew, so did their responsibility to contribute. If circumstances allowed, seven was the age of entrance into formal education. Peasant and urban children took up responsibilities around the house.

== Adolescence (ages 12–14) ==
By age 12, the child began to take on a more serious role in family duties. Although according to canon law at the age of twelve girls could marry, this was relatively uncommon unless the child was an heiress or belonged to a family of noble birth. Peasant children at this age stayed at home and continued to learn and develop domestic skills and husbandry. Urban children moved out of their homes and into the homes of their employer, or master (depending on their future roles as servants or apprentices). Noble boys learned skills in arms, and noble girls learned to run households. Once married off, a young girl had no control over her body and all of her decisions were made by her husband. It was common for a young woman to bear her first child in her teen-aged years

The end of childhood and entrance into adolescence was marked by leaving home and moving to the house of the employer (or master), entering a university or into church service.

== See also ==
- Childhood in Scotland in the Middle Ages
- Childhood in the Viking Age

== Sources ==
- Szarmach, Paul, M. Teresa Tavormina and Joel Rosenthal, "Children and Childhood." Medieval England: An Encyclopedia 3. New York & London: Garland Publishing, Inc., 1998 (print).
