= Childhood in early modern Scotland =

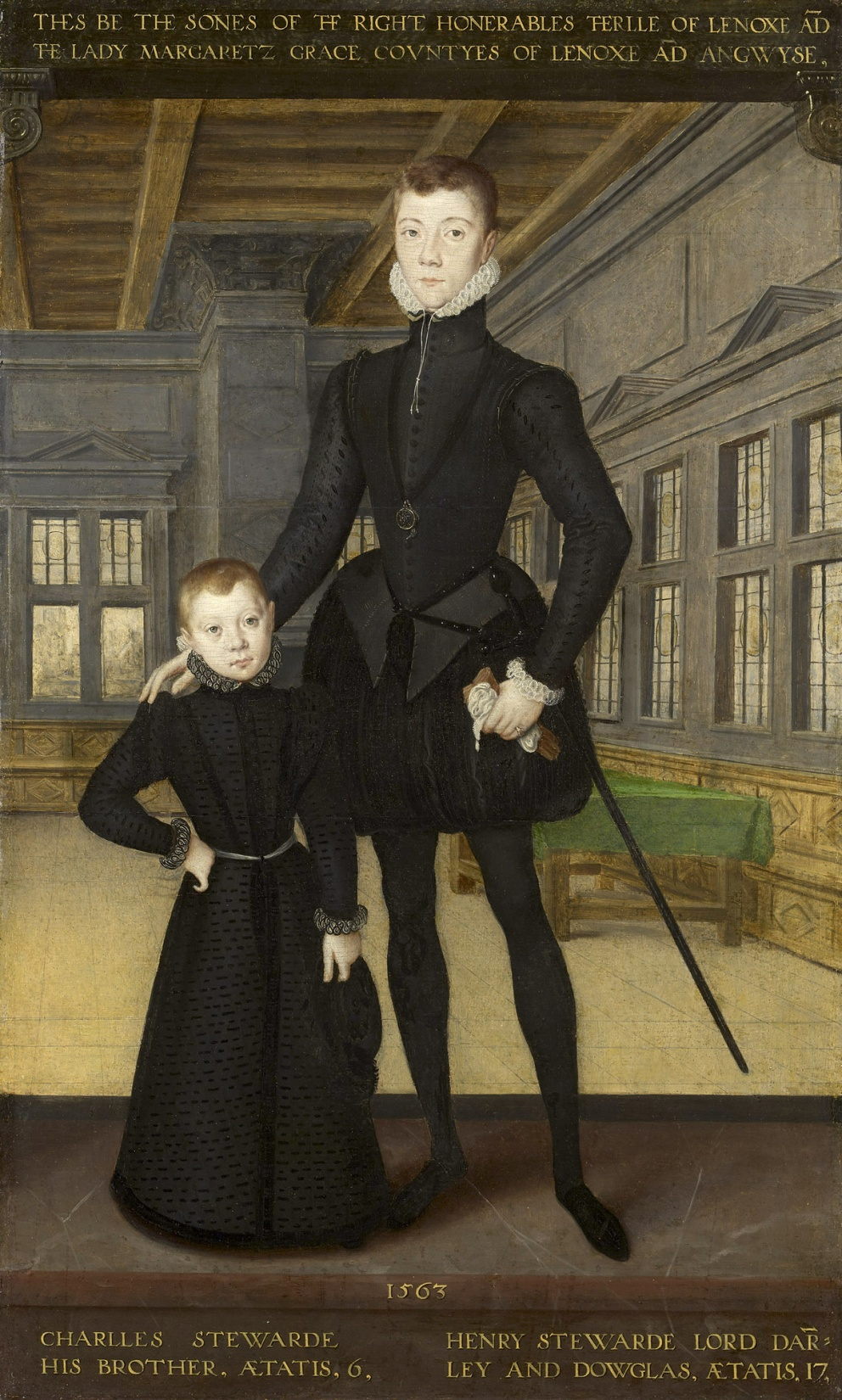
Henry Stuart, Lord Darnley, age 17, and his brother Lord Charles Stuart (later 5th Earl of Lennox), age 6, in a painting attributed to Hans Eworth (1563)

Birth was a predominately female event in early modern Scotland, although fathers were often present or nearby to assert their paternity. Before the Reformation, baptism was a means of creating wider spiritual kinship with godparents, but in the reformed Kirk it was used to strengthening relationships between the child and the parents, particularly the father. Among the elite of Highland society, there was a system of fosterage that created similar links to those of godparenthood. It was common, particularly among richer families, to employ a wet-nurse to care for the child. The primary responsibility for bringing up young children fell on the mother.

For many the early teens were marked by moving away from home to undertake life-cycle service. Boys might be apprenticed to a trade, or become agricultural servants. Girls might go into domestic or agricultural service. For those higher up in society and increasingly for those lower down, this might be after a period of schooling. For the wealthy and sometimes for the very talented, they might move on to one of Scotland's universities. The Humanist concern with widening education that had become significant in the Renaissance was shared by Protestant reformers. Boys might attend the grammar schools or ordinary parish schools. There were also large number of unregulated "adventure schools". By the late seventeenth century there was a largely complete network of parish schools in the Lowlands, but in the Highlands basic education was still lacking in many areas. The widespread belief in the limited intellectual and moral capacity of women, vied with a desire, intensified after the Reformation, for women to take personal moral responsibility, particularly as wives and mothers. They were frequently taught reading, sewing and knitting, but not writing and much lower literacy rates.

== Birth ==
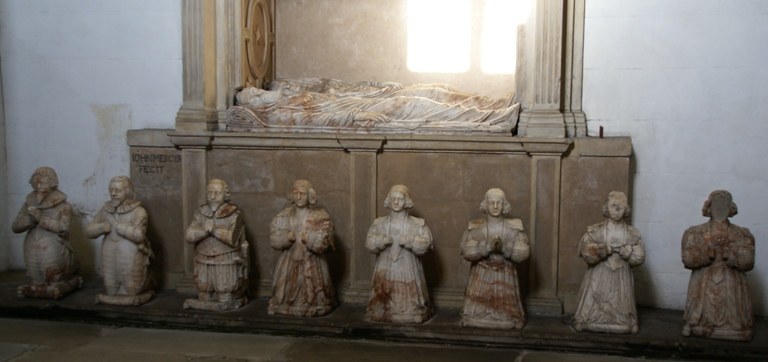
Sir George Bruce monument, Culross Abbey, showing his children praying below the tomb

Although sources are limited, Scotland may have had a higher infant mortality rate than England, where rates were higher than in many modern Third-World countries, with 160 children in 1,000 dying in their first year. There was considerable concern over the safety of mother and child in birth. Although childbirth was a predominantly female event, with neighbours and midwives in support, the father was often present in or near the birthing chamber to assert or admit his paternity. David Arnot, a physician serving aristocratic women in the 17th-century, provided talismans of stones and belts for pregnant women.

Before the Reformation, baptism was a means of creating wider spiritual kinship with godparents, but in the reformed Kirk godparents were abolished and it was used as a means of strengthening the "natural" relationships with the parents, particularly the father, who would have the primary responsibility for the moral and spiritual education of the child.

== Young children ==
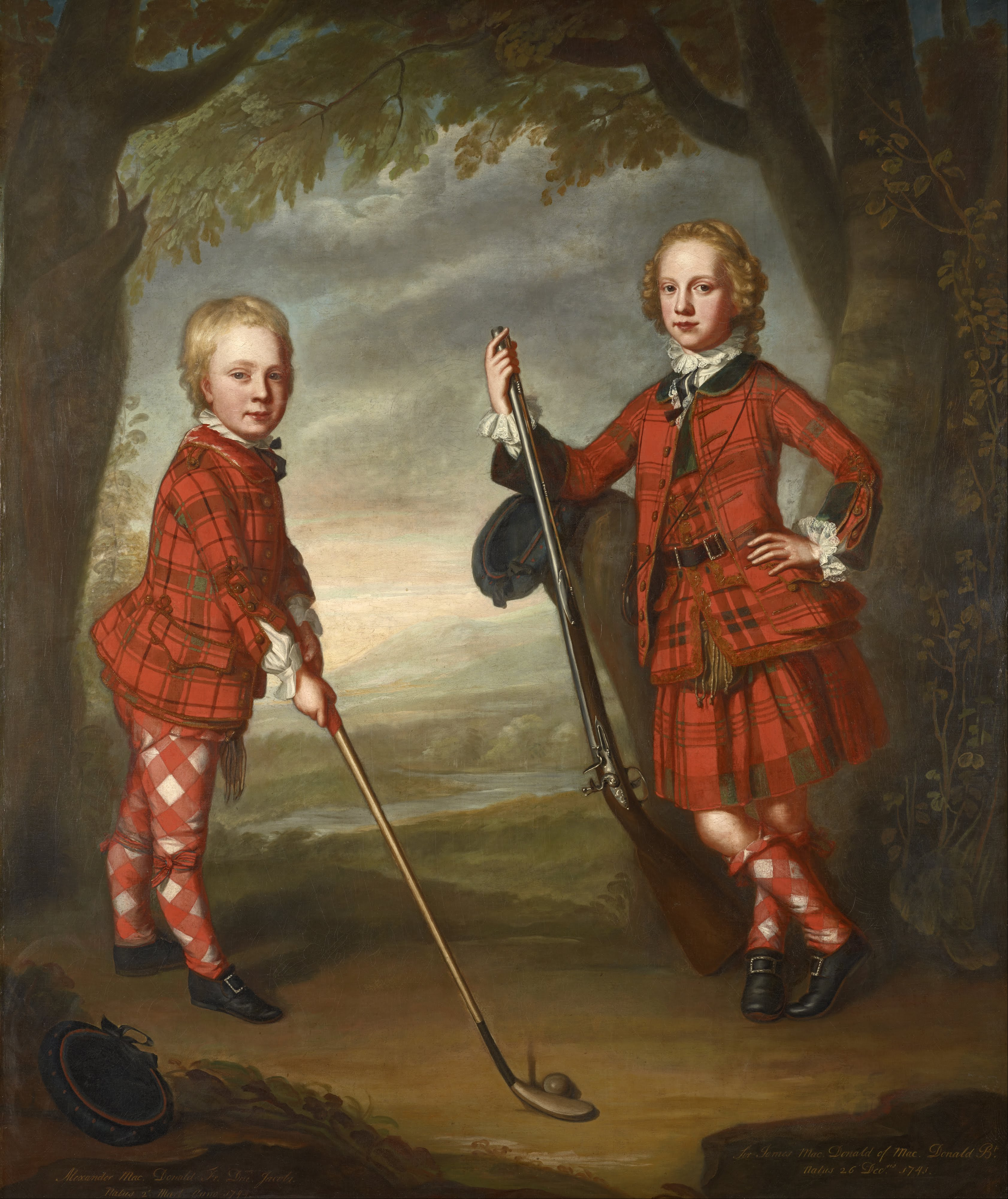
James (1741–65) and Alexander Macdonald (1744–1810) in a painting attributed to William Mosman

Following birth it was common, particularly among richer families, to employ a wet-nurse to care for the child, sometimes living in with the family. In late seventeenth century Edinburgh 6.8 per cent of families employed such a nurse and they were most common among wealthier middle-class households. Records show that royal wet-nurses including Isobel Colt and Margaret Masterton were replaced due to fears for infant health.

Among the elite of Highland society, there existed a system of fosterage that created similar links to godparenthood, with children being sent to the households of other major families to facilitate the creation of mutual bonds, and which continued into the seventeenth century. Few sources give an insight into the experiences of young children in this period. Some parents played with their children and parents demonstrated grief at their loss. The primary responsibility for bringing up young children fell on the mother. For older children the major duty of parents was, according to the Kirk, to ensure the spiritual development of the child, with fathers leading daily family prayers, but it is not clear how widely these practices were adopted. After the Reformation, first communion probably served as a rite of puberty, marking the transition to sit beside adults at the kirk boards for the first time.

== Youth ==
Historians debate whether early modern individuals experienced a period of youth in the modern sense. For many the early teens were marked by moving away from home to undertake life-cycle service, which was necessary so that they could build up skills and capital that would enable them to marry and create a separate household. Lowland Scotland was part of the pattern of late marriage for both men and women (between the mid and late 20s), with a relatively large proportion of the population remaining unmarried. In the Highland and Islands marriage ages may have been lower. Lower down in society boys might be apprenticed to a trade, or become agricultural servants. Girls might go into domestic or agricultural service. For those higher up in society and increasingly for those lower down, this might be after a period of schooling. For the wealthy and sometimes for the very talented, they might move on to one of Scotland's universities. It is clear that football was played by sixteenth-century schoolboys, and probably servants and apprentices, because of widespread attempts to ban it.

== Education ==
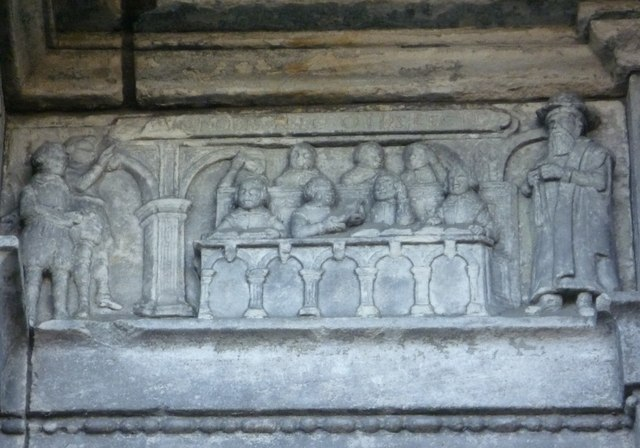
A carving of a seventeenth-century classroom with a dominie and his ten scholars, from George Heriot's School, Edinburgh

The Humanist concern with widening education that had become significant in the Renaissance was shared by Protestant reformers. For boys, in the burghs the old schools were maintained, with the song schools and a number of new foundations becoming reformed grammar schools or ordinary parish schools. There were also large number of unregulated "adventure schools", which sometimes fulfilled a local needs and sometimes took pupils away from the official schools. At their best, the curriculum included catechism, Latin, French, Classical literature and sports. A series of acts attempted to establish schools in every parish from 1616. By the late seventeenth century there was a largely complete network of parish schools in the Lowlands, but in the Highlands basic education was still lacking in many areas.

The widespread belief in the limited intellectual and moral capacity of women, vied with a desire, intensified after the Reformation, for women to take personal moral responsibility, particularly as wives and mothers. In Protestantism this necessitated an ability to learn and understand the catechism and even to be able to independently read the Bible, but most commentators, even those that tended to encourage the education of girls, thought they should not receive the same academic education as boys. In the lower ranks of society, they benefited from the expansion of the parish schools system that took place after the Reformation, but were usually outnumbered by boys, often taught separately, for a shorter time and to a lower level. They were frequently taught reading, sewing and knitting, but not writing. Female illiteracy rates based on signatures among female servants were around 90 per cent, from the late seventeenth to the early eighteenth centuries and perhaps 85 per cent for women of all ranks by 1750, compared with 35 per cent for men. Among the nobility there were many educated and cultured women, of which Mary, Queen of Scots is the most obvious example.
