= Alasdair Macintosh Geddes =

British medical doctor (1934–2024)

Alasdair Macintosh Geddes CBE
- Born: 14 May 1934; Fortrose, Scotland
- Died: 9 April 2024 (aged 89)
- Education: University of Edinburgh
- Known for: Diagnosing the world's last reported fatality due to smallpox; Research on antimicrobials; Editor Journal of Antimicrobial Chemotherapy and International Journal of Antimicrobial Agents
- Medical career
- Profession: Emeritus Professor of Infectious Diseases
- Institutions: East Birmingham Hospital; University of Birmingham

Alasdair Macintosh Geddes CBE (14 May 1934 – 9 April 2024) was a Scottish medical doctor who was Professor of Infection at the University of Birmingham Medical School. In 1978, as the World Health Organization (WHO) was shortly to announce that the world's last case of smallpox had occurred a year earlier in Somalia, Geddes diagnosed Janet Parker with the disease in Birmingham, England. She was found to be the index case of the outbreak and became the world's last reported fatality due to the disease, five years after Geddes had gained experience on the frontline of the WHO's smallpox eradication programme in Bangladesh in 1973.

His early research included work on drug discovery and antibiotics, and the definitions and management of bacterial meningitis and pneumococcal disease. In 1975, he became Chairman of the first editorial board of the Journal of Antimicrobial Chemotherapy. In the same year he was co-editor of the best seller book titled Control of Hospital Infection, later known as Ayliffe's Control of Healthcare-Associated Infection: A Practical Handbook.

Following the September 11 attacks, Geddes became an adviser on bioterrorism for the UK's Department of Health; his primary roles were in the national smallpox plan and in biodefence training. In 2015, he retired from his position as Editor-in-Chief of the International Journal of Antimicrobial Agents, having served the journal for the previous 10 years. His recollections of smallpox in Birmingham inspired Mark Pallen to write The Last Days of Smallpox: Tragedy in Birmingham, published in 2018.

== Early life and education ==
Alasdair Geddes was born in Fortrose, near Inverness, Scotland, on 14 May 1934, to Angus and Isabella Geddes. His early education was at the Fortrose Academy, the local school.

In 1957 Geddes graduated in medicine from the University of Edinburgh, where his interest in antibiotics later originated.

== Medical career ==
Geddes completed his early medical posts at the Royal Infirmary of Edinburgh and then in Perth, following which he spent two years completing National Service in the Royal Army Medical Corps, and rose to the rank of captain. Subsequently, he gained experience in infectious diseases and general medicine first at Edinburgh and then as a medical registrar at Aberdeen and began research on antibiotics, with publications in the British Medical Journal and The Lancet. After a visit to the United States, he returned to Britain and took up a post as one of two consultants in infectious diseases at the East Birmingham (now Heartlands) Hospital in May 1967, at the same time as the local smallpox hospital, Witton Isolation Hospital, was deemed unnecessary and therefore demolished by fire. Geddes, at the time, settled in Solihull. He later recounted that when "I told my friends in Edinburgh that I was going to work in infectious diseases, they thought I was a bit stupid. They said you're mad, infectious diseases are disappearing, we have antibiotics and vaccines, why don't you do something more interesting!"

=== Bangladesh (1973) ===
In 1973, the Department of Health assigned Geddes as a visiting fellow with the World Health Organization (WHO) smallpox eradication effort in Bangladesh, where he spent seven weeks under the leadership of Nick Ward, travelling through villages and gaining frontline experience in smallpox vaccination. He later recalled "I saw many cases of smallpox."

In October 1973, as a consequence of the oil crisis, he was called to return to England. In the same year, he was designated Birmingham's smallpox consultant. The following year, in an article in the British Medical Journal, he described signs and symptoms of smallpox and wrote that

the possibility of smallpox should be considered in every patient with unexplained fever who has recently visited the five countries of the world where this disease is still endemic—namely, India, Pakistan, Bangladesh, Nepal and Ethiopia. The likelihood of smallpox re-appearing in countries other than these five should always be remembered.

=== Writing ===
In 1975, Geddes became chairman of the first editorial board of the Journal of Antimicrobial Chemotherapy. In the same year, he co-edited the best-seller Control of Hospital Infection, later known as Ayliffe's Control of Healthcare-Associated Infection: A Practical Handbook. In 1976 L. P. Garrod stated in his review of the book that it made much "of how to cope with a suspected case of smallpox. As the WHO claims that this disease is on the verge of extinction, even in Bangladesh, may future editions safely omit this?" Throughout his career, Geddes authored almost 200 scientific publications covering a wide range of infectious disease topics.

=== Antibiotics ===
Geddes' early research included work on drug discovery and studies on the use of cephaloridine. Pertaining to trials of what became known as Augmentin, a combination of amoxicillin and clavulanic acid, he later recalled that "getting the right dose of amoxicillin proved important for efficacy and getting the right dose of clavulanic acid was key to tolerability". In 1977, he published on the efficacies of cephamycins, including their parenteral administration, dosages and penetrations through normal and inflamed blood–brain barrier. He made comparisons of clindamycin with lincomycin against Haemophilus influenzae in vitro, and later demonstrated that clindamycin was active against Coxiella burnetti, the cause of Q fever. Other research included studies on the antiviral aciclovir.

=== Birmingham (1978) ===
In August 1978, five years after returning from Bangladesh, Geddes diagnosed smallpox in Janet Parker, a medical photographer working in the East Wing of the medical school in Birmingham. She had been admitted to Ward 32 at East Birmingham Hospital after being diagnosed with at first chickenpox and then a drug reaction. Several physicians saw her before Geddes was called to the hospital for an opinion. Aware that Parker also worked in a room above the regional smallpox laboratory, he in turn called upon virologist Henry Bedson and both confirmed their suspicions that same day when they examined fluid from Parker's blisters and saw brick-shaped particles under the electron microscope, compatible with smallpox. Until this time, all the call-outs he received for suspected smallpox cases were false-alarms such as erythema multiforme and Stevens–Johnson syndrome. With the WHO about to announce the eradication of smallpox, it was widely thought that the last ever case of smallpox had occurred the previous year, in 1977 in Somalia. Parker later died on 11 September 1978 and became the last reported fatality due to the disease. Later, in an interview in 2004, when asked if Parker's case had any link with the 1966 smallpox outbreak in Birmingham, he replied "it is probably significant that the initial case in the variola minor outbreak in the West Midlands in 1966 was, like Janet Parker, a photographer in the Birmingham Medical School, where research was being carried out on smallpox viruses."

=== 1980s ===
Geddes was appointed professor of infectious diseases at Birmingham University in 1982. In chapter seven of the Report of a committee of inquiry into the future development of the Public Health Function, chaired by the then Chief Medical Officer Sir Donald Acheson and presented to parliament in the wake of the 1984 outbreak of Salmonella in Wakefield and the 1985 outbreak of legionellosis at Stafford, Geddes was noted to head a subcommittee to deal with control of communicable disease and infection.

=== 1990s ===
In the 1990s, Geddes was involved in tuberculosis (TB) research, leading the University of Birmingham team in the Glaxo Action tuberculosis programme that studied the molecular biology of Mycobacterium tuberculosis and new ways of delivering medicines into the TB infected cells. By studying how the human immune system responded to TB, Geddes hoped that the results would lead to a new vaccine, more effective than the BCG.

In 1991 Geddes became professor of infection at the University of Birmingham Medical School, where in 1994 he became its Deputy Dean then Associate Dean from 1999 to 2002. He has served as civilian consultant in infectious diseases and tropical medicine to the Royal Navy, Deputy Chairman of the Tropical Diseases Research Board of the UK Medical Research Council, and the Committee on Safety of Medicines and of the Joint Committee on Vaccination and Immunisation.

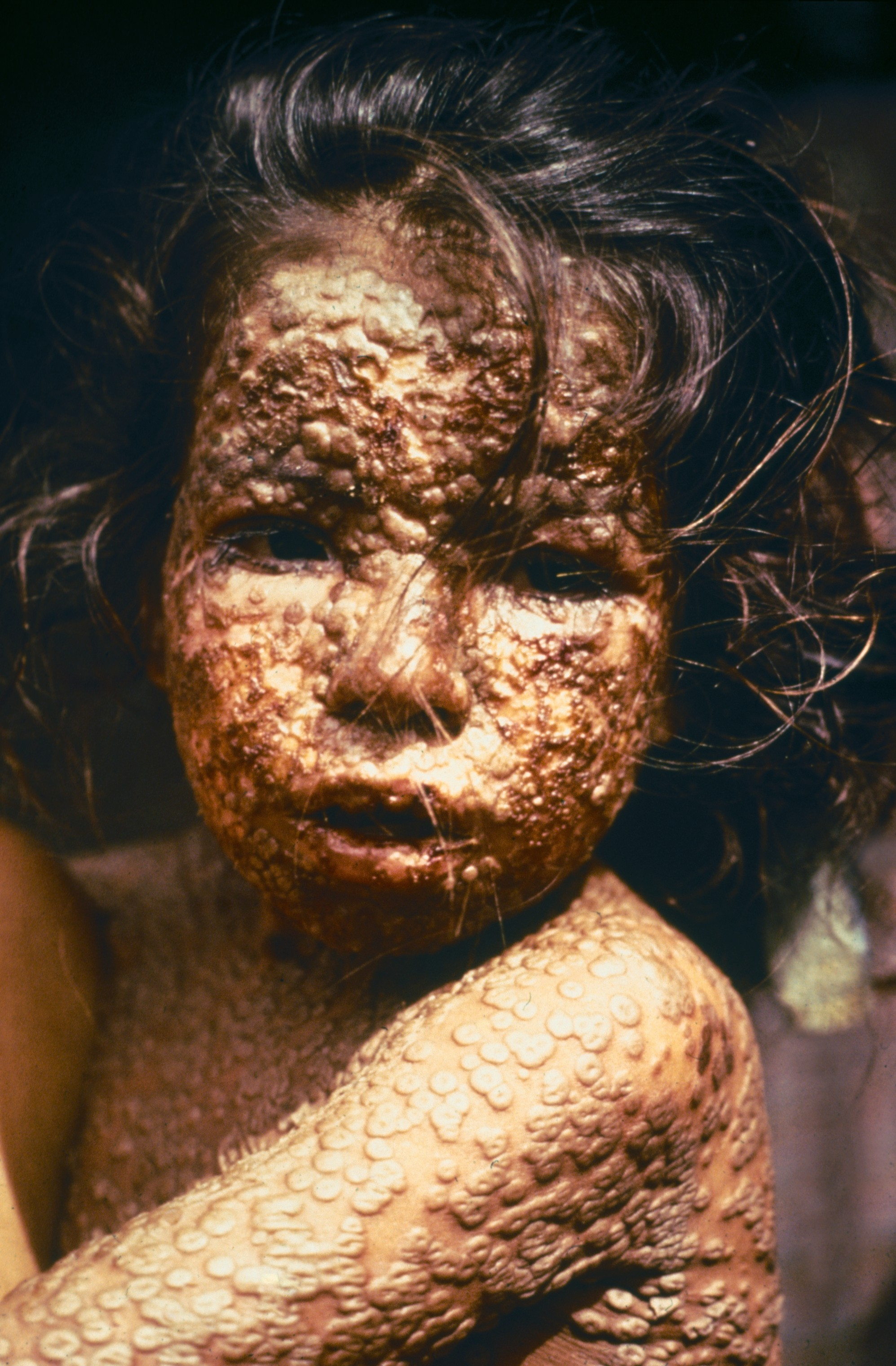
Child with Smallpox, Bangladesh, 1973, the year Geddes was assigned to the WHO smallpox eradication effort in Bangladesh

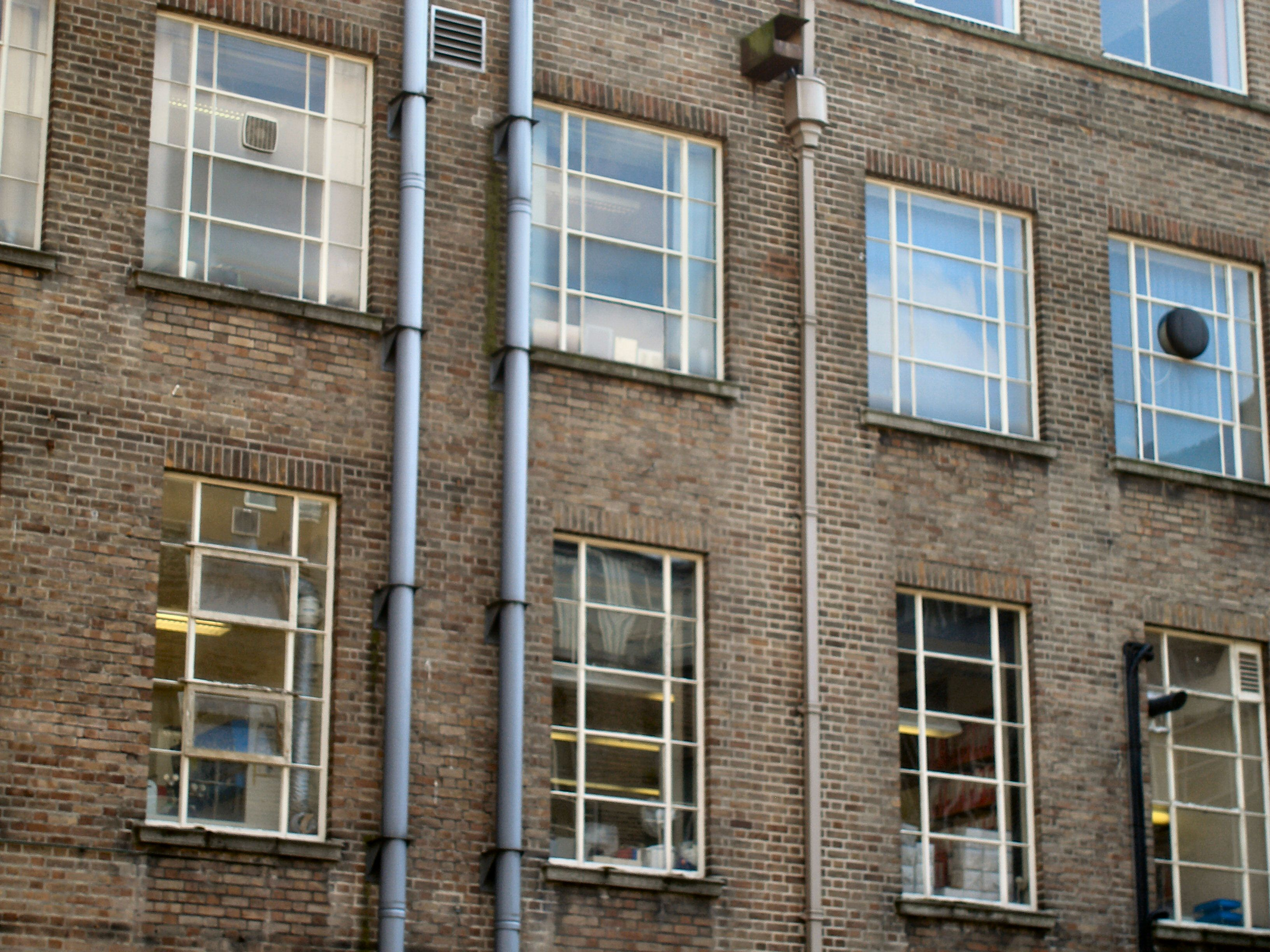
The rear of the Medical School showing the location of the smallpox laboratory (bottom) and the rooms where Parker worked (above)

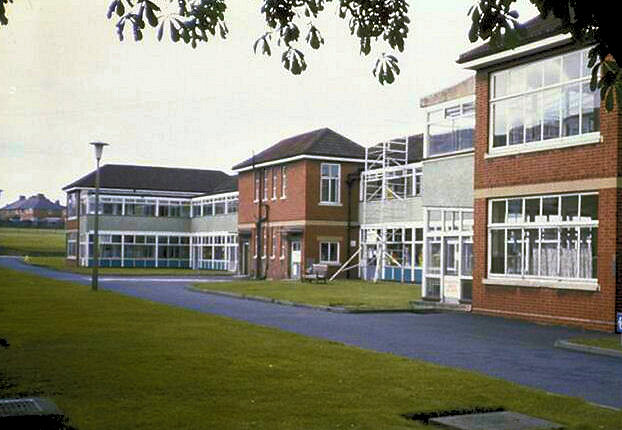
The ward block at East Birmingham Hospital, Birmingham UK in 1978. It has since been demolished. It shows Wards 31 (ground level) and 32 (upper level).

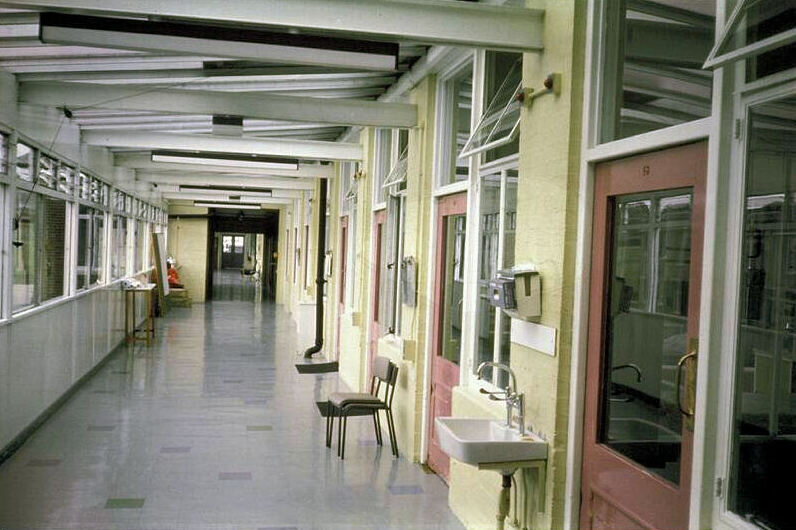
Ward 32, where Geddes diagnosed smallpox in 1978

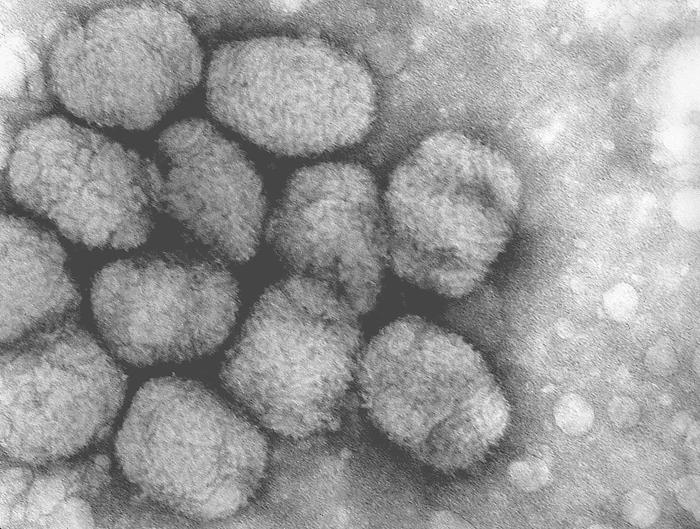
Electron micrograph of smallpox virus, similar to what Geddes would have seen in Parker's sample.

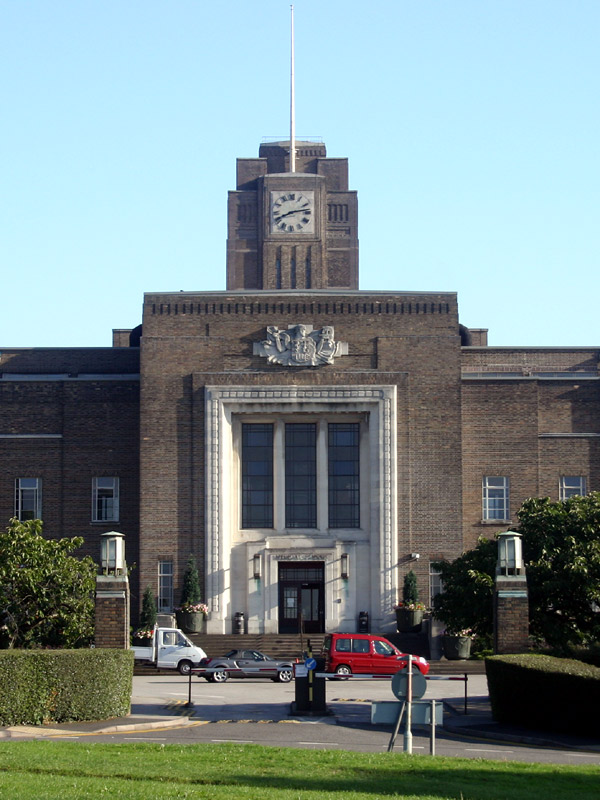
University of Birmingham Medical School, where Geddes became professor

== Later career ==
Following the September 11 attacks, Geddes became an adviser on bioterrorism for the UK's Department of Health, primarily working with the country’s national smallpox plan, and in biodefence training.

In 2002, Geddes told the Global Health Security Initiative that the

diagnosis of a smallpox case must not be underestimated. Differential diagnosis against influenza, chickenpox, Eczema herpeticum, Eczema vaccinatum and drug eruptions/erythema multiforme is necessary. The last smallpox case in Birmingham, UK, caused by a lab infection in 1978, was initially misdiagnosed by 3 physicians, leading to a significant delay in treatment and containment measures. This fact underlines the importance of an appropriate education and training of physicians to diagnose disease caused by bioterroristic agents as part of the preparedness plans.

With smallpox in the media again after 2001, and noting that Parker had previously received two smallpox vaccinations, he became interested in how long immunity lasts in those who have previously been immunised. It led him to study and publish in 2005 an article on the Edinburgh smallpox outbreak of 1942, where six of the 36 cases of smallpox had received previous vaccination. The following year he published "The history of smallpox".

In 2015, after 10 years in the post, he retired from his position as Editor-in-Chief of the International Journal of Antimicrobial Agents.

== Awards and honours ==
Geddes was a Fellow of the Academy of Medical Sciences. From 1996 to 1998 he was president of the International Society for Infectious Diseases. The following year, the British Society for Antimicrobial Chemotherapy awarded him the Garrod Medal, following which he delivered its accompanying lecture. In 2009, he received Honorary Membership of the International Society of Antimicrobial Chemotherapy. He received the European Society of Clinical Microbiology and Infectious Diseases award for excellence in clinical microbiology and infectious diseases in 2014. Subsequently, in 2015 he received the Hamao Umezawa Memorial Award (HUMA) Award.

He was appointed Commander of the Order of the British Empire (CBE) in the 1996 New Year Honours for services to Medicine.

His recollections of 1978 inspired Mark Pallen to write The Last Days of Smallpox: Tragedy in Birmingham, published in 2018.

== Death ==
Geddes died after a long illness on 9 April 2024, at the age of 89.

== Selected publications ==
- Geddes, A. M. (15 March 1986). "Risk of AIDS to health care workers". British Medical Journal (Clinical Research Ed.). 292 (6522): 711–712. doi:10.1136/bmj.292.6522.711. ISSN 0267-0623. PMC 1339770. PMID 3082404.
- Tarlow, M.; Geddes, A. M. (12 December 1992). "Meningococcal meningitis or septicaemia: a plea for diagnostic clarity". The Lancet. 340 (8833): 1481. doi:10.1016/0140-6736(92)92678-9. ISSN 0140-6736. PMID 1360607. S2CID 20402590. (Joint author)
- Kerrod, Emma; Geddes, Alasdair M.; Regan, Martyn; Leach, Steve (February 2005). "Surveillance and Control Measures during Smallpox Outbreaks". Emerging Infectious Diseases. 11 (2): 291–297. doi:10.3201/eid1102.040609. ISSN 1080-6040. PMC 3320452. PMID 15752449. (Joint author)
- Geddes, Alasdair M. (1 May 2006). "The history of smallpox". Clinics in Dermatology. 24 (3): 152–157. doi:10.1016/j.clindermatol.2005.11.009. ISSN 0738-081X. PMID 16714195.
- Geddes, Alasdair M.; Klugman, Keith P.; Rolinson, George N. (December 2007). "Introduction: historical perspective and development of amoxicillin/clavulanate". International Journal of Antimicrobial Agents. 30 (Suppl 2): S109–112. doi:10.1016/j.ijantimicag.2007.07.015. ISSN 0924-8579. PMID 17900874. (Joint author)
