= Heart of England NHS Foundation Trust =

Healthcare trust in England

- Type: Foundation trust
- Disbanded: 1 April 2018
- Chair: Jacqui Smith
- Chief executive: David Rosser
- Staff: 11,000
- Website: www.heartofengland.nhs.uk

Heart of England NHS Foundation Trust (HEFT) was one of the largest organisations running NHS hospitals in England. The hospitals and services run by HEFT included Heartlands Hospital, Solihull Hospital and Community Services, Good Hope Hospital in Sutton Coldfield and Birmingham Chest Clinic. The trust was under the leadership of chair Jacqui Smith and chief executive David Rosser, who succeeded Julie Moore on 1 September 2018.

In September 2016 HEFT announced plans to merge with the University Hospitals Birmingham NHS Foundation Trust. The merger took place on 1 April 2018. The combined organisation will have a turnover of £1.6bn and 2,700 beds across four main hospitals.

== History ==
The Trust's history can be traced back to the opening of Little Bromwich Hospital in June 1895, which was a fever hospital and sanatorium in Yardley. In April 1963 it merged with Yardley Green hospitals to become East Birmingham District General Hospital, before going on to acquire the Marston Green Maternity Hospital. It became the first acute trust in Birmingham in April 1992.

== Performance ==
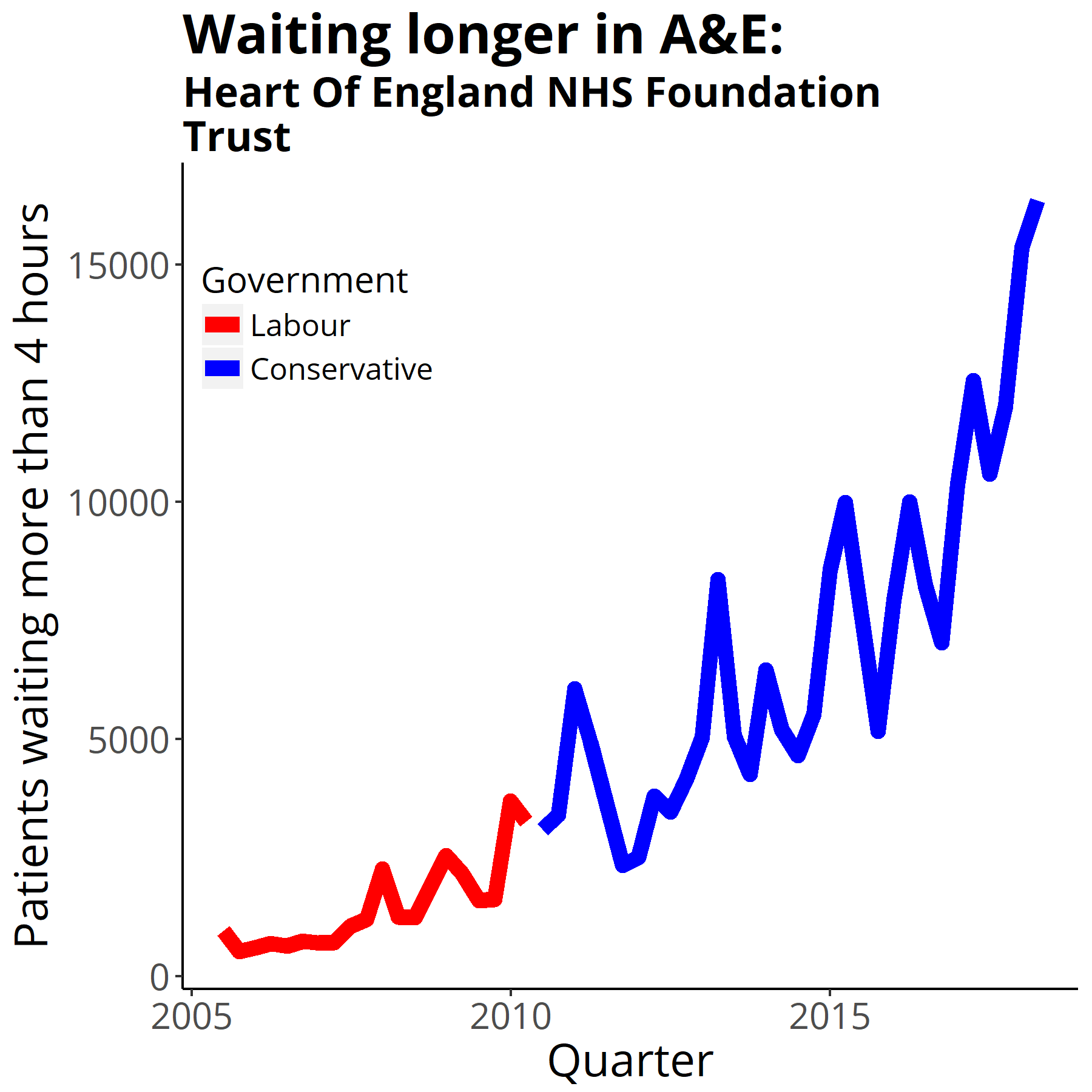
Four-hour target in the emergency department quarterly figures from NHS England Data from https://www.england.nhs.uk/statistics/statistical-work-areas/ae-waiting-times-and-activity/

In July 2013 the Care Quality Commission announced that Heart of England would be one of the Trusts to be inspected by Professor Sir Mike Richards under the new inspection regime.

In December 2013 the Trust was one of thirteen hospital trusts named by Dr Foster Intelligence as having higher than expected mortality indicator scores for the period April 2012 to March 2013 in their Hospital Guide 2013.

In April 2014 it was announced that Les Lawrence had been appointed as the new chairman following a competitive interview process to succeed Lord Hunt who was to retire in May. He had been a non-executive director for more than two years, and was previously the cabinet member for children, young people and families at Birmingham City Council He had also chaired both the Royal Orthopaedic Hospital NHS Foundation Trust and the Alexandra Hospital in Redditch.

Chief Executive Dr Mark Newbold resigned in November 2014 after the trust had a condition placed on its licence by Monitor on 24 October relating to poor performance on waiting times and mortality. He said that overcrowding of the hospitals was the main problem which he had not solved.

The trust was one of 26 responsible for half of the national growth in patients waiting more than four hours in accident and emergency over the 2014/5 winter.

It reported a deficit of £35.9 million accrued in the period from April to October 2015. Spending on clinical staff had increased by 10% and on nursing staff by 11% once Dame Julie Moore and Jacqui Smith, ex-chief executive and chair respectively of University Hospitals Birmingham NHS Foundation Trust took over the leadership of the trust. In February 2016 it was expecting a deficit of £59 million for the year.

In March 2016 the Trust was rated as having a poor reporting culture in the Learning from Mistakes League.

== See also ==
- List of hospitals in England
- List of NHS trusts
- Healthcare in West Midlands
