= Helen Heffernan =

New Zealand microbiologist

Helen Heffernan CNZM
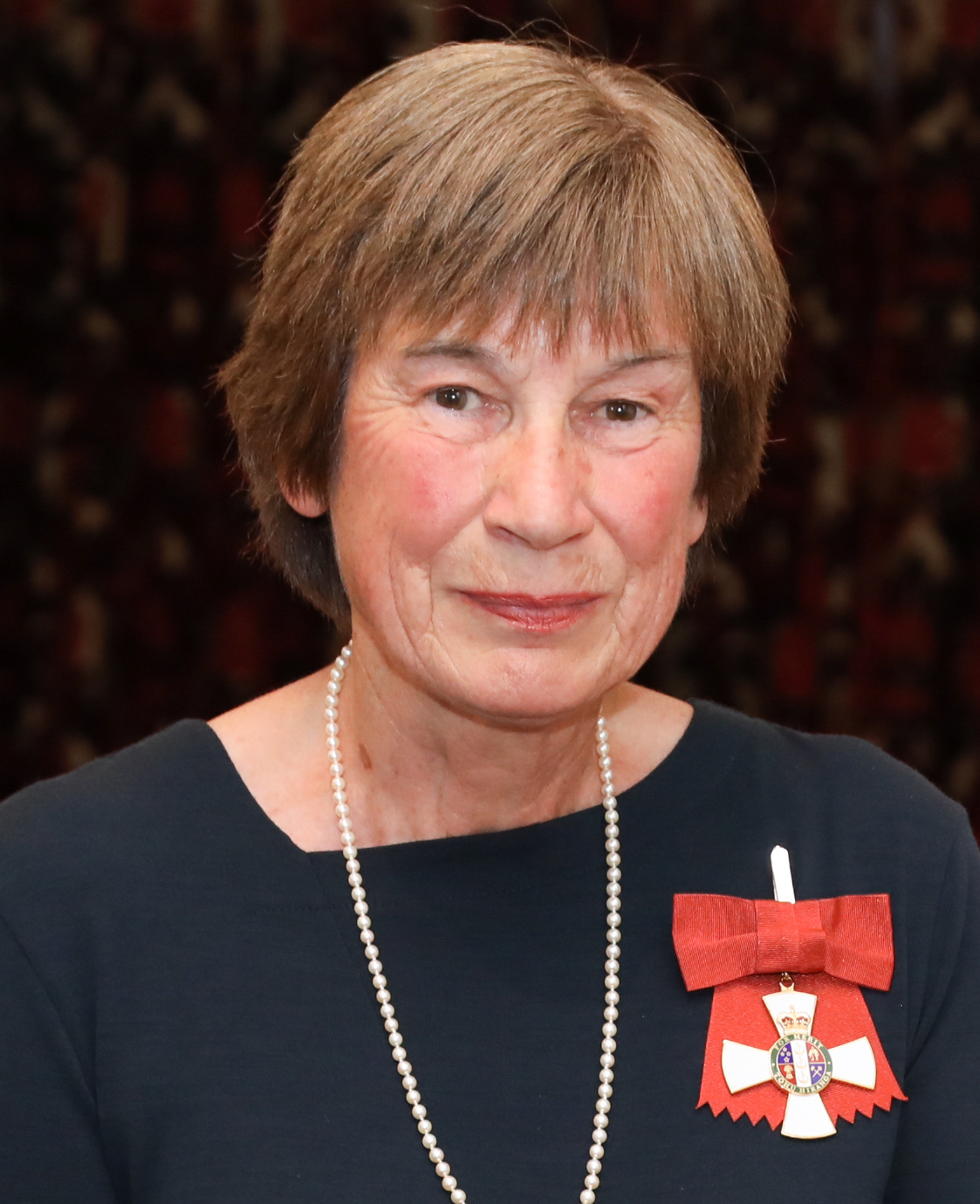
- Heffernan in 2020
- Education: University of Otago
- Scientific career
- Fields: Microbiology
- Workplaces: Institute of Environmental Science and Research

Helen Mary Heffernan CNZM is a New Zealand microbiologist, specialising in antibiotic resistance. In 2020, she was appointed a Companion of the New Zealand Order of Merit, for services to health. The Institute of Environmental Science and Research awarded Heffernan their Lifetime Achievement Award in 2018.

== Academic career ==
Heffernan earned a Bachelor of Science with Honours from the University of Otago. She worked at New Zealand's National Health Institute and the Institute of Environmental Science and Research (ESR), a Crown Research Institute.

Heffernan's research involved the development of cold chain standards, which are important for the safe management and storage of vaccines. She also carried out surveillance for infectious diseases, allowing the rate of spread of antimicrobial resistance to be slowed. Heffernan's research was the basis for vaccine programmes against haemophilus influenzae type b, pneumococcus and meningococcus.

Heffernan was a member a number of national committees, including the National Antimicrobial Committee, the Ministry for Primary Industries' Technical Advisory Group, and the Ministry of Health's Pneumococcal Surveillance Advisory Group. She spoke about New Zealand's place in the 'global antimicrobial crisis' at the One Health symposium in 2017. She also represented New Zealand at regional meetings in the Pacific, and at the World Health Organization's workshop on Antimicrobial Resistance Surveillance.

== Honours and awards ==
In the 2020 New Year Honours, Heffernan was appointed a Companion of the New Zealand Order of Merit, for services to health. On her appointment, Heffernan asked New Zealanders to play their part to reduce antibiotic resistance, saying, "While antibiotics are essential medicines to treat bacterial infections, we overuse and misuse them and this contributes to resistance". On her retirement in 2018, after a 43-year career, ESR awarded Heffernan their Lifetime Achievement Award.

== Selected works ==
- François Vandenesch; Timothy S Naimi; Enright, Mark; et al. (2003). "Community-acquired methicillin-resistant Staphylococcus aureus carrying Panton-Valentine leukocidin genes: worldwide emergence". Emerging Infectious Diseases. 9 (8): 978–984. doi:10.3201/eid0908.030089. PMC 3020611. PMID 12967497. Wikidata Q24598936.
- Cameron Burton; Best, Emma; Matthew Broom; Heffernan, Helen Mary; Simon Briggs; Webb, Rachel (2023). "Pediatric Invasive Meningococcal Disease, Auckland, New Zealand (Aotearoa), 2004–2020". Emerging Infectious Diseases. 29 (4): 686–695. doi:10.3201/eid2904.221397. PMID 36957984. Wikidata Q130355931.
- Williamson, Deborah Anne; Hanna E. Sidjabat; Freeman, Joshua T.; et al. (2012). "Identification and molecular characterisation of New Delhi metallo-β-lactamase-1 (NDM-1)- and NDM-6-producing Enterobacteriaceae from New Zealand hospitals". International Journal of Antimicrobial Agents. 39 (6): 529–533. doi:10.1016/j.ijantimicag.2012.02.017. PMID 22526013. Wikidata Q48050341.
- Freeman, Joshua T.; Stephen J McBride; Heffernan, Helen Mary; Tracy Bathgate; Chris Pope; Roderick B Ellis-Pegler (2008). "Community-onset genitourinary tract infection due to CTX-M-15-Producing Escherichia coli among travelers to the Indian subcontinent in New Zealand". Clinical Infectious Diseases. 47 (5): 689–692. doi:10.1086/590941. PMID 18665816. Wikidata Q45138244.
- Rajan P Adhikari; Cook, Gregory Murray; Lamont, Iain; Selwyn Lang; Heffernan, Helen Mary; John M B Smith (2002). "Phenotypic and molecular characterization of community occurring, Western Samoan phage pattern methicillin-resistant Staphylococcus aureus". Journal of Antimicrobial Chemotherapy. 50 (6): 825–831. doi:10.1093/jac/dkf242. PMID 12461000. Wikidata Q40686052.
