= Fever hospital =

Hospital for infectious diseases

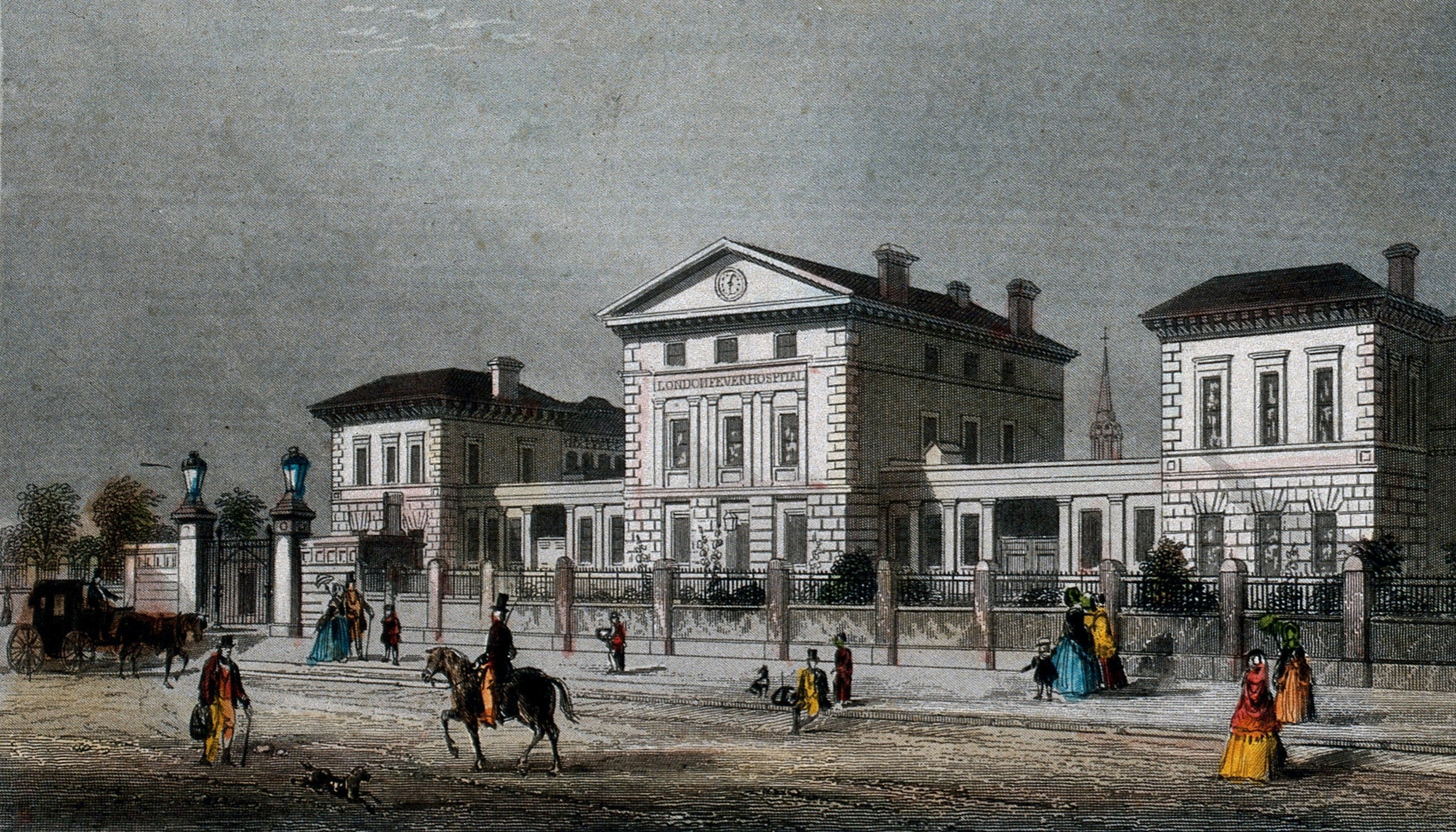
The London Fever Hospital

Smallpox hospital ships moored at Long Reach. They are (L–R) Atlas, Endymion and Castalia. The latter had two hulls on which hospital buildings were constructed.

A fever hospital or isolation hospital is a hospital for infectious diseases such as scarlet fever, tuberculosis, lassa fever and smallpox. Their purpose is to treat affected people while isolating them from the general population. Early examples included the Liverpool Fever Hospital (1801) and the London Fever Hospital (1802). Other examples occurred elsewhere in the British Isles and India.

The hospitals became common in England when laws were passed at the end of the 19th century, requiring notification of infectious diseases so that public health officers could ensure that the patients were isolated. During the 20th century, immunisation and antibiotics reduced the impact of these diseases. After the introduction of the National Health Service in 1948, the hospitals were wound down so that, by 1968, there were few left.

As a result of the COVID-19 pandemic a number of temporary isolation wards within existing hospitals were established as well as several temporary hospitals, such as the nightingale hospitals in England which were little used in many countries with the notable exception of China.

It has been suggested that creating modern isolation hospitals might be an effective way of managing highly infectious diseases as was shown in China during the COVID-19 pandemic. however the lack of staff to operate these facilities, the large costs for no ongoing direct patient benefit and the inability to use other hospital facilities to provide care for patients have been cited as the key reasons why fever hospitals are not appropriate in modern healthcare.

== England and Wales ==
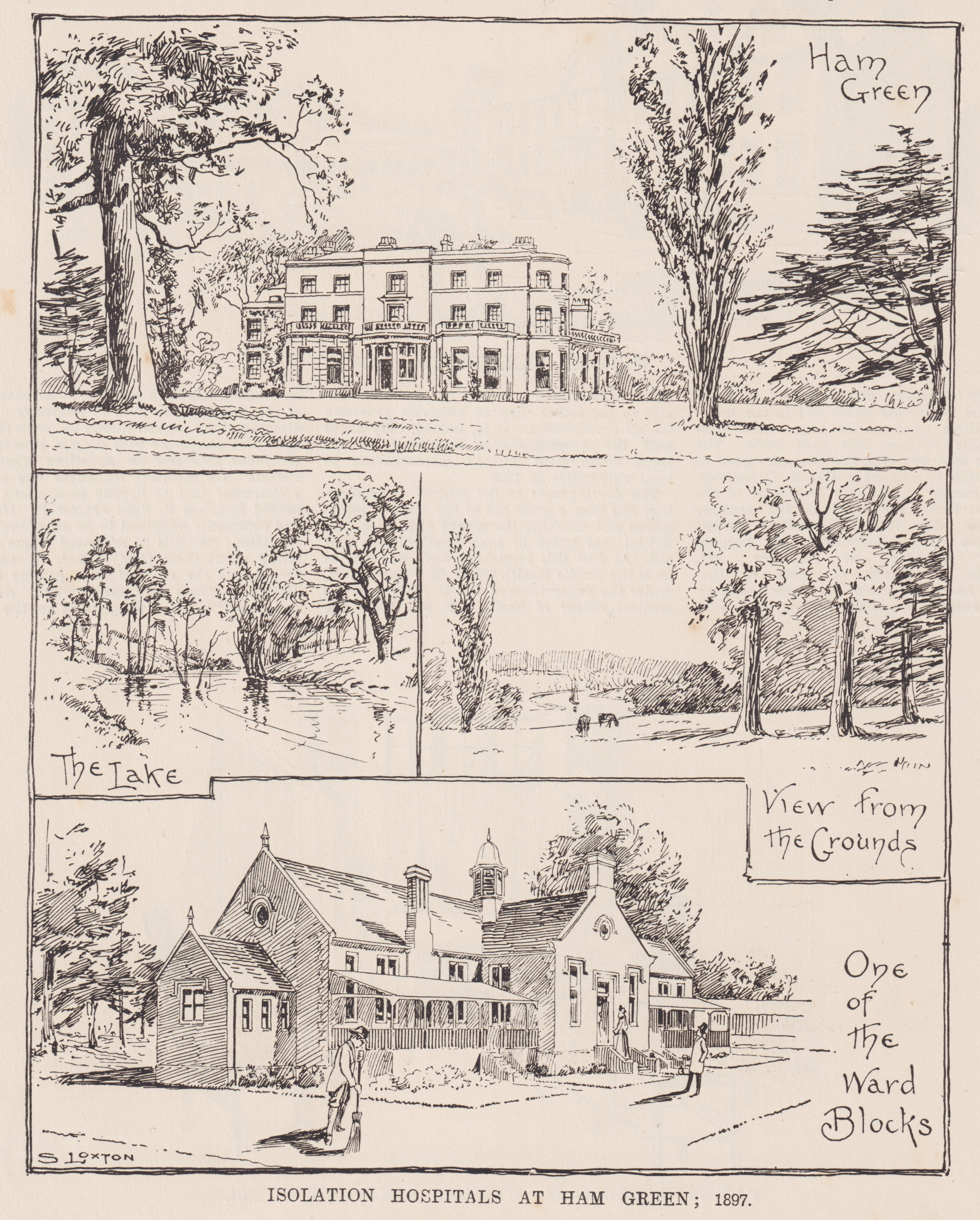
Isolation Hospitals at Ham Green, Bristol, 1897

The first hospital specifically for smallpox was the London Smallpox Hospital, founded in 1741. The first specialist hospital for other infectious diseases was the Liverpool Fever Hospital which was founded in 1801. Fever hospitals or "houses of recovery" were then established in other major cities – Chester, Hull, London, Manchester, Newcastle upon Tyne and Norwich. These were mainly for the treatment of typhus which was common. By 1879, isolation hospitals of some sort were established in 296 local authorities, out of a total of 1,593 – about 18.5%. As the germ theory of disease and nature of infection became established, more fever hospitals were established so that, by 1914, they were the most common sort of hospital. The numbers and sizes of the different sort of institutions at that time were

| Institution | Average size (beds) | Number in England and Wales |
|---|---|---|
| Fever hospital | 41 | 755 |
| Poor Law infirmary | 134 | 700 |
| General hospital | 53 | 594 |
| Smallpox hospital | 22 | 363 |
| Specialist hospital | 62 | 222 |

After the London Fever Hospital was established in 1802, six more hospitals were established in London by the Metropolitan Asylums Board. These were designed with two separate buildings – one for smallpox patients and one for sufferers from other infectious diseases: cholera, diphtheria, dysentery, measles, scarlet fever, typhoid fever, typhus and whooping cough.

In London, there were protests and legal action against fever hospitals by residents who were concerned about the risk of infection. Precautions were taken, such as disinfection of ambulances, but it was found that the incidence of smallpox increased near smallpox hospitals. Siting of the hospitals next to rivers, so that transport of patients could be limited to ambulance steamers was found to reduce this. Ships, moored on the Thames at Long Reach, were also used as isolation hospitals.

=== Notification ===
The UK Infectious Disease (Notification) Act 1889 (52 & 53 Vict. c. 72) required that local authorities be notified of the occurrence of such infectious diseases. The medical officer of health was then empowered to isolate the patients to prevent spreading. Well-to-do patients could be isolated at home but poorer people lacked the facilities and space for this. The requirement for isolation thus drove the need for provision of hospitals for this purpose. These measures were compulsory in the London area and were made compulsory in the rest of the country by the Infectious Disease (Notification) Extension Act 1899 (62 & 63 Vict. c. 8).

=== Cross infection ===
Cross-infection was a significant issue because patients with different diseases might be put in the same ward and share facilities such as towels. Isolation hospitals were then criticised as places "where a person goes in with one infectious disease and catches all the rest." Patients returning from such hospitals might then spread the acquired infections to members of their families. These were called return cases and they could result in complaints and lawsuits. A major difficulty was a lack of understanding of scarlet fever, which was the most common disease at that time. The nature of the disease and how it was transmitted was uncertain. To prevent return cases, hospitals tried extending the period of isolation and giving patients disinfectant washes with formalin or Lysol when discharging them.

== List of hospitals ==
=== England ===
- Catherine-de-Barnes Isolation Hospital, located in the Midlands, this was the UK's national isolation hospital from 1966 and the world's last victim of smallpox died there in 1978. (closed 1985)
- Eastern Fever Hospital, Homerton
- Fazakerley Fever Hospital, Liverpool, now known as Aintree University Hospital
- Grove Fever Hospital, Tooting and the Fountain Fever Hospital, which was built as an annexe in 1893 for an outbreak of scarlet fever (closed 1958)
- Little Bromwich Fever Hospital, Birmingham, now known as Heartlands Hospital
- London Fever Hospital, Liverpool Rd, Islington
- Monsall Fever Hospital, Manchester (closed 1993)
- Northern Convalescent Fever Hospital, Enfield (closed 1993)
- Park Fever Hospital, Hither Green (closed 1997)
- Western Fever Hospital, Fulham (closed 1979)
- Brumby Isolation Hospital, Scunthorpe, North Lincolnshire (closed 1960)
- Coppetts Wood Hospital, North London (closed 2008)

=== Scotland ===
- City Hospital, Aberdeen
- City of Glasgow Smallpox and Fever Hospital, Belvidere
- Edinburgh City Hospital for Infectious Diseases
- King's Cross Hospital for Infectious Diseases, Dundee
- Ruchill Hospital, Glasgow

=== Wales ===
- Pembroke Dock Isolation Hospital
- Sandy Haven Isolation Hospital
- West Wales Isolation Hospital, Llanelli, known as Mynydd Mawr Hospital

=== India ===
- Sir Ronald Ross Institute of Tropical and Communicable Diseases, also known as the Fever Hospital

=== Ireland ===
- Cork Street Fever Hospital, Dublin
- Ruins of a Fever Hospital in Oxpark townland, Cloughjordan, County Tipperary
- Purdysburn Fever Hospital, Belfast

=== China ===
- Isolation Hospital, Shanghai International Settlement
- Chinese Public Isolation Hospital, Zhabei
- Isolation Hospital, Ruijin Hospital, Shanghai French Concession

=== New Zealand ===
- Fever Hospital, Wellington (1920-1953)

== See also ==
- Lazaretto
- Leper colony
- Pest house
- Sanitorium
