= Birmingham Organising Committee for the 2022 Commonwealth Games =

Limited company in the United Kingdom

The Birmingham Organising Committee for the 2022 Commonwealth Games (BOCCG) was the organisation responsible for overseeing the planning and development of the 2022 Commonwealth Games. It was jointly established by the UK Government's Department for Culture, Media and Sport, the Birmingham City Council and the Commonwealth Games England and was structured as a private company limited by guarantee. The headquarters of the organising committee were located in One Brindleyplace, where it took up the 73,000 sq ft, five-floor office until December 2022.

== Formation ==
In 2017, the Commonwealth Games Federation (CGF) chose Birmingham as the host city for the 2022 Commonwealth Games. After the success of the Birmingham bid, BOCCG was formed to continue the work started by the bidding team. BOCCG was officially designated as the organisers of the Games at its first board meeting on 13 September 2018.

== Board of directors ==
The board of Directors are:

- John Crabtree (Chairman of the Board)
- Ian Ward (Leader of Birmingham City Council)
- Derrick Anderson (West Midlands Combined Authority)
- Louise Martin (President of Commonwealth Games Federation)
- Ellie Simmonds (Paralympic Swimmer)
- Julie Moore (former CEO, University Hospitals, Birmingham)
- Ian Metcalfe (Chair of Commonwealth Games England)
- Geoff Thompson (five-time world karate champion)
- Sandra Osborne SCM, QC (President of the Barbados Olympic Association)
- Lyndsey Jackson (Deputy Chief Executive of the Edinburgh Festival Fringe Society)
- Nick Timothy (newspaper columnist and visiting Fellow at Wadham College, Oxford)
- Ama Agbeze (English netball player)
- Simon Ball (Senior Independent Director, Commonwealth Games England)
- Hiren Dhimar (Senior Commercial Adviser, Department for Digital, Culture, Media and Sport)

Members of the CGF from the host country are required by CGF rules to be on the organising committee board, as well as representatives of the host Commonwealth Games association.

== Executive management team ==
The executive management team are responsible for delivering the Games and oversee the key business areas of Birmingham 2022. The executive management team includes:

- Ian Reid, Chief Executive
- Josie Stevens, Chief Marketing & Communications Officer
- Martin Green, Chief Creative Officer
- Caroline Mcgrory, Chief Legal Officer
- Charles Quelch, Executive Director of Operations
- David Grady, Chief Finance Officer
- Adrian Corcoran, Chief Information Officer
