= 1978 smallpox outbreak in the United Kingdom =

Event leading to the last known smallpox death

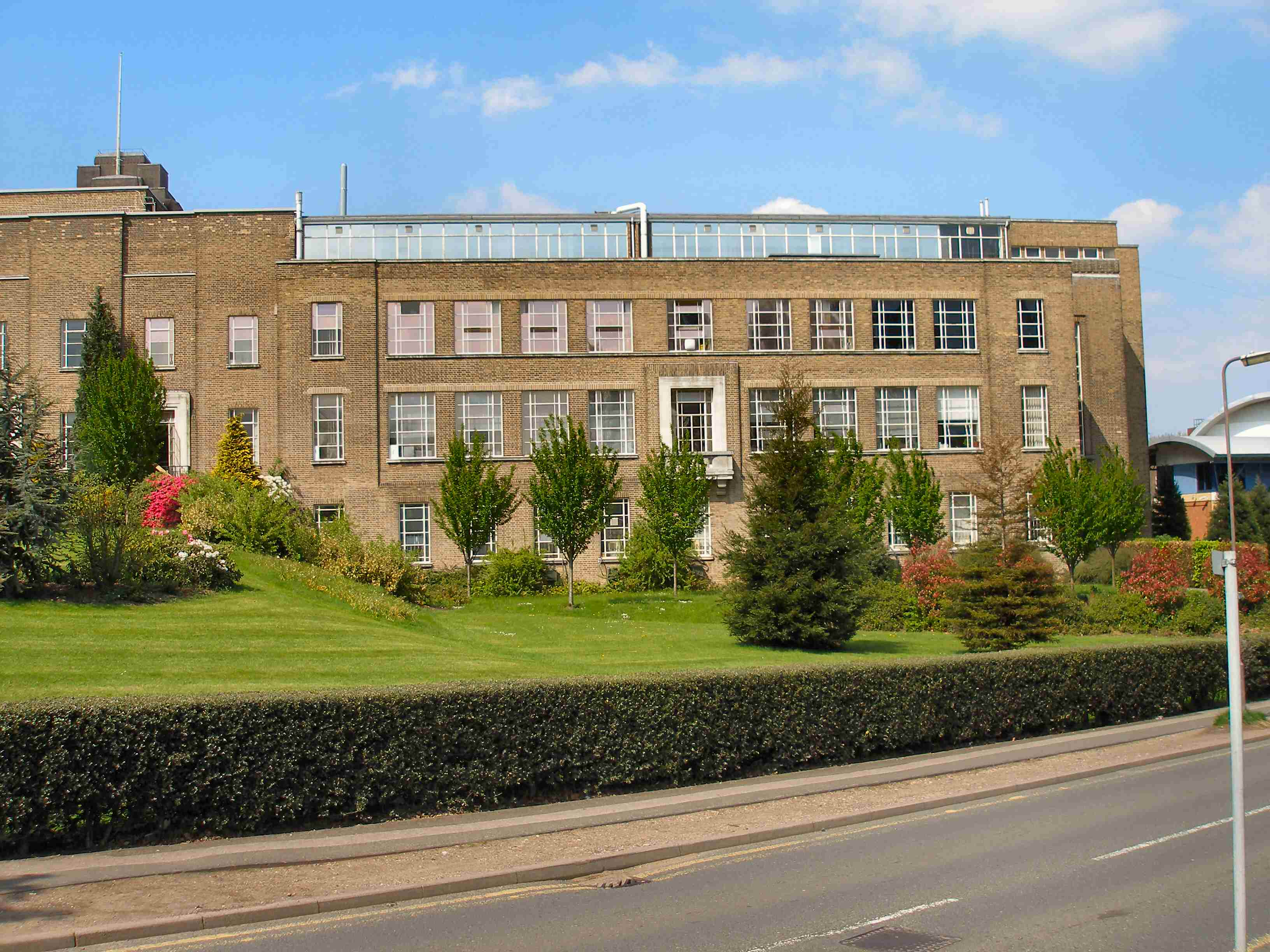
The East Wing of the University of Birmingham Medical School, which was the source of the outbreak

In 1978, a smallpox outbreak in the United Kingdom led to the death of Janet Parker, a British medical photographer. She was the last person recorded to have died from this disease. Parker's illness and death were linked to two additional fatalities, prompting the government to establish the Shooter Inquiry. This official investigation, conducted by a panel of experts headed by microbiologist R.A. Shooter, led to significant reforms in the study of dangerous pathogens in the UK.

The Shooter Inquiry found that Parker was accidentally exposed to a strain of smallpox virus that had been grown in a research laboratory on the floor below her workplace at the University of Birmingham Medical School. Shooter concluded that the mode of transmission was most likely airborne through a poorly maintained service duct between the two floors. However, this assertion has been subsequently challenged, including when the University of Birmingham was acquitted following a prosecution for breach of Health and Safety legislation connected with Parker's death. Several internationally recognised experts produced evidence during the prosecution to show that it was unlikely that Parker was infected by airborne transmission in this way. Although there is general agreement that the source of Parker's infection was the smallpox virus grown at the Medical School laboratory, how Parker contracted the disease remains unknown.

== Background ==
=== Smallpox research at the Birmingham Medical School ===
Smallpox is an infectious disease unique to humans, caused by either of two virus variants named Variola major and Variola minor, with the latter typically producing a milder disease. The World Health Organization (WHO) had established a smallpox eradication programme and, by 1978, was close to declaring that the disease had been eradicated globally. The last naturally occurring infection was of Variola minor in Somalia in 1977.

At the time of the 1978 outbreak, a laboratory at University of Birmingham Medical School had been conducting research on variants of smallpox virus known as "whitepox viruses", which were considered to be a threat to the success of the WHO's eradication programme. The laboratory was part of the Microbiology Department, the head of which was virologist Henry Bedson, son of Sir Samuel Phillips Bedson.

A smallpox outbreak in the area had occurred in 1966, when Tony McLennan, a medical photographer working at the medical school, contracted the disease. He had a mild form of the disease, which was not diagnosed for eight weeks. He was not quarantined and there were at least twelve further cases in the West Midlands, five of whom were quarantined in Witton Isolation Hospital in Birmingham. There are no records of any formal enquiries on the source of this outbreak despite concerns expressed by the then head of the laboratory, Peter Wildy.

In 1977, the WHO had told Henry Bedson that his application for his laboratory to become a Smallpox Collaborating Centre had been rejected. This was partly because of safety concerns; the WHO wanted as few laboratories as possible handling the virus.

=== Janet Parker ===
Parker was born in March 1938, and was the only daughter of Frederick and Hilda Witcomb (née Linscott). She was married to Joseph Parker, a Post Office engineer, and lived in the Kings Norton area of Birmingham. After several years as a police photographer, she joined the University of Birmingham Medical School, where she was employed as a medical photographer in the Anatomy Department. She often worked in a darkroom above the laboratory where research on smallpox viruses was being conducted.

== The infection and related events ==
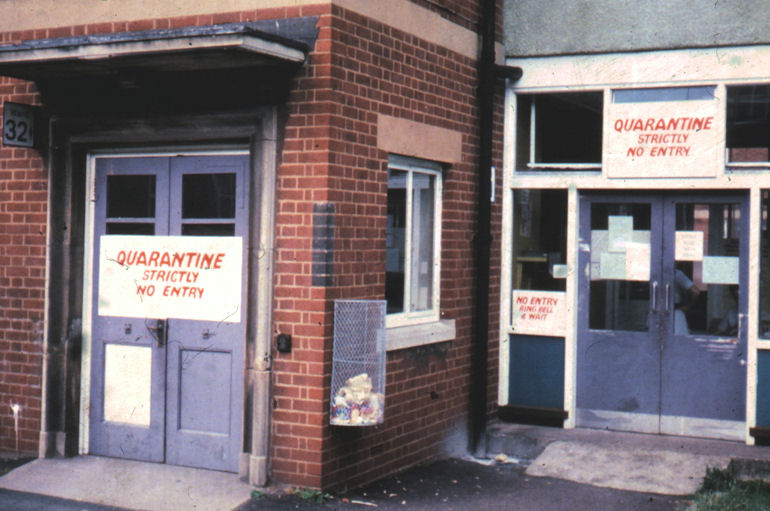
The exterior of Wards 32 and 33 at East Birmingham Hospital during the 1978 smallpox outbreak

=== Parker's illness and death ===
On 11 August 1978, Parker (who had been vaccinated against smallpox in 1966, but not since) fell ill; she had a headache and pains in her muscles. She developed spots that were thought to be a benign rash, or chickenpox. On 20 August at 3 pm, she was admitted to East Birmingham Hospital and a clinical diagnosis of Variola major, the most serious type of smallpox, was made by consultant Alasdair Geddes.

By this time the rash had spread and covered all Parker's body, including the palms of her hands and soles of her feet, and it was confluent (i.e. the lesions had merged) on her face. At 10 pm she was on her way to Catherine-de-Barnes Isolation Hospital near Solihull. By 11 pm all her close contacts, including her parents, were placed in quarantine. Her parents were later also transferred to Catherine-de-Barnes. The next day, poxvirus infection was confirmed by Henry Bedson, then Head of the Smallpox laboratory at the Medical School, by electron microscopy of vesicle fluid, which Geddes had sampled from Parker's rash. Samples of the fluid were also collected by a biomedical scientist for examination at the Regional Virus Laboratory, which was in East Birmingham Hospital. Parker died of smallpox at Catherine-de-Barnes on 11 September 1978. She was the last recorded person to die from smallpox.

Special disease control measures had to be put into place for Parker's funeral. Ron Fleet from Sheldon, who at the time of Parker's death worked for Solihull funeral director Bastocks and later for the BBC at Pebble Mill, recalled that he was told that authorities "would not allow the body to be stored in a fridge in case the virus managed to multiply":

I was expecting to retrieve the body from a fridge in the mortuary, but... it was stored in a body bag that was kept on the floor of a garage away from the main hospital building. She was in a transparent body bag packed with wood shavings and sawdust. There was also some kind of liquid and I remember that I was frightened that the bag would split open. The body was covered in sores and scars – it was quite horrific. I was on my own and I needed help to lift the body... but I managed to get her into the van. People from the hospital were very wary of helping me... When the day of the funeral arrived, the cars were given an escort by unmarked police vehicles just in case there was an accident... The body had to be cremated because there was a chance the virus could have thrived in the ground if Mrs Parker had been buried. All other funerals were cancelled that day and the Robin Hood Crematorium was thoroughly cleaned afterwards.

Concerns over the survival of infectious virus in Parker's body were well-founded, and at the inquest the coroner, who signed Parker's cremation certificate, disallowed an autopsy for safety reasons.

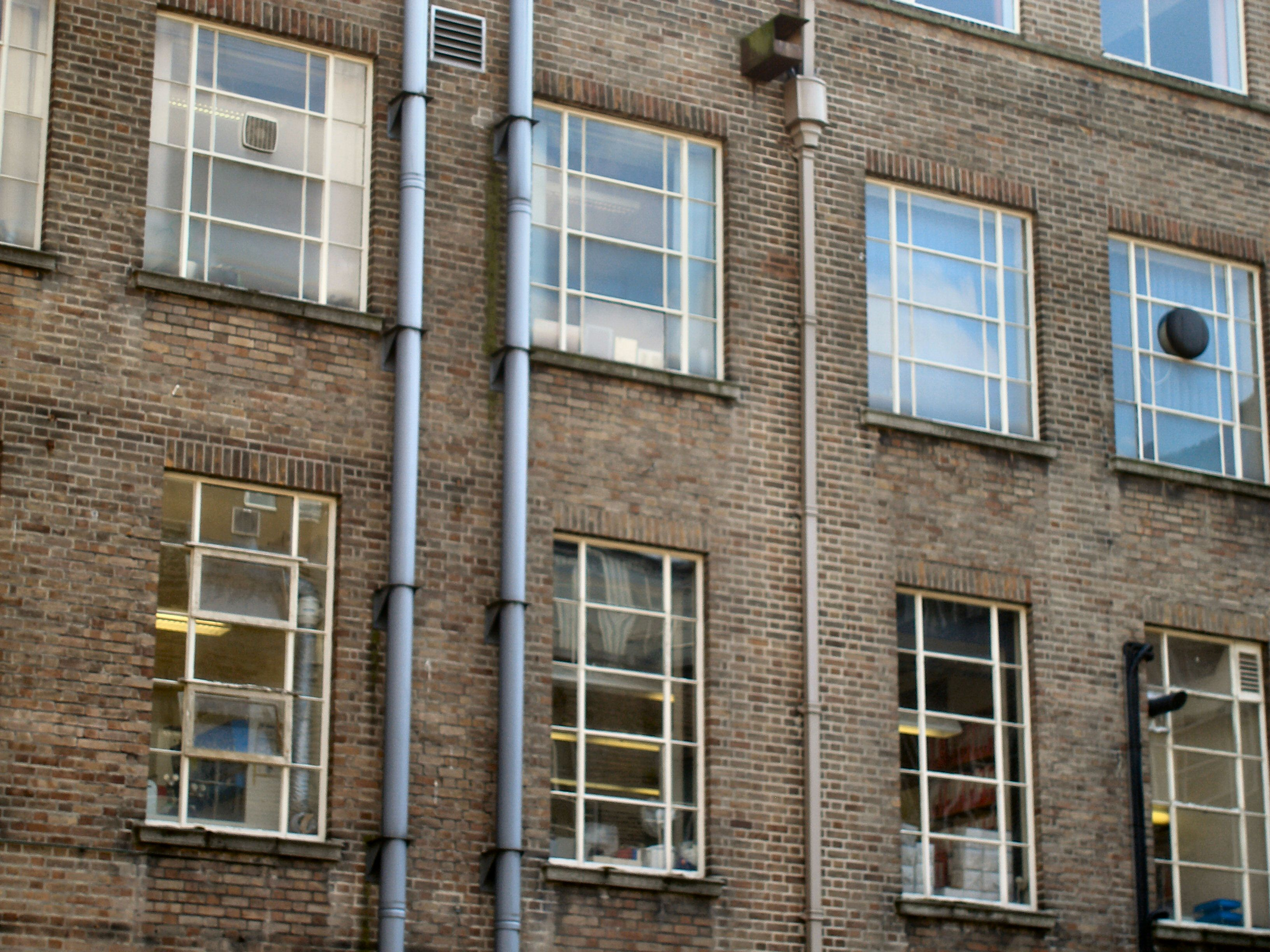
The rear of the Medical School showing the location of the smallpox laboratory (bottom) and the rooms where Parker worked (above)

=== Quarantine and containment ===
Many people had close contact with Parker before she was admitted to hospital. The outbreak prevention response included 260 people being immediately quarantined, several of them at Catherine-de-Barnes Hospital, including the ambulance driver who transported Parker. More than 500 people who had been (or had possibly been) in contact with Parker were given vaccinations against smallpox. On 26 August, health officials went to Parker's house in Burford Park Road, Kings Norton, and fumigated her home and car. On 28 August, five hundred people were placed in quarantine in their homes for two weeks.

Parker's mother contracted smallpox on 7 September, despite having been vaccinated against the disease on 24 August. Her case was described as "very minor" and she was subsequently declared free from infection and was discharged from hospital on 22 September. Other than Parker's mother, no further cases occurred. The other close contacts, which included two biomedical scientists from the Regional Virus Laboratory, were released from quarantine in Catherine-de-Barnes on 10 October 1978.

Birmingham was declared officially free of smallpox on 16 October 1978. In October 1979, the university authorities fumigated the Medical School East Wing. The ward at Catherine-de-Barnes Hospital in which Parker had died was still sealed off five years after her death, all the furniture and equipment inside left untouched.

=== Related deaths ===
On 5 September 1978, Parker's 71-year-old father, Frederick Witcomb, of Myrtle Avenue, Kings Heath, died while in quarantine at Catherine-de-Barnes Hospital. He appeared to have died following a cardiac arrest when visiting his daughter. No post-mortem was carried out on his body because of the risk of smallpox infection.

On 6 September 1978, Henry Bedson, head of the Birmingham Medical School microbiology department, cut his throat in the garden shed while in quarantine at his home in Cockthorpe Close, Harborne. He died at Birmingham Accident Hospital a few days later. His suicide note read:

I am sorry to have misplaced the trust which so many of my friends and colleagues have placed in me and my work.

In Bedson's Munk's Roll biography published by the Royal College of Physicians, virologist Peter Wildy and Sir Gordon Wolstenholme wrote:

Journalists launched a relentless effort to fix the blame on him and his staff for a breach of technique, and union officials stirred up public fears by confusing the issues with those then arising from genetic manipulation. Harassed as the chosen 'villain' of the tragedy, Henry Bedson's normally stable personality broke down and he took his own life. It could be said that he was a victim of his own dedicated conscientiousness, and of his extreme sense of responsibility.

== Subsequent investigations and reactions ==
=== The Shooter inquiry ===
Plan of the Birmingham smallpox laboratory in 1978, based on one in the Shooter Report. A = smallpox laboratory; B = animalpox laboratory; C = tissue culture laboratory; E = corridor with swing barrier; D = internal service ducts with access hatches. The position of two safety cabinets is shown at the top with extraction ducts to the windows (black arrows). The circles represent centrifuges and the squares various incubators and refrigerators. The laboratory was about 9.5 metres wide.

An official government inquiry into Parker's death was conducted by a panel led by microbiologist R.A. Shooter, and comprising Christopher Booth, Sir David Evans, J.R. McDonald, David Tyrrell and Sir Robert Williams, with observers from the World Health Organization (WHO), the Health and Safety Executive and the Trades Union Congress.

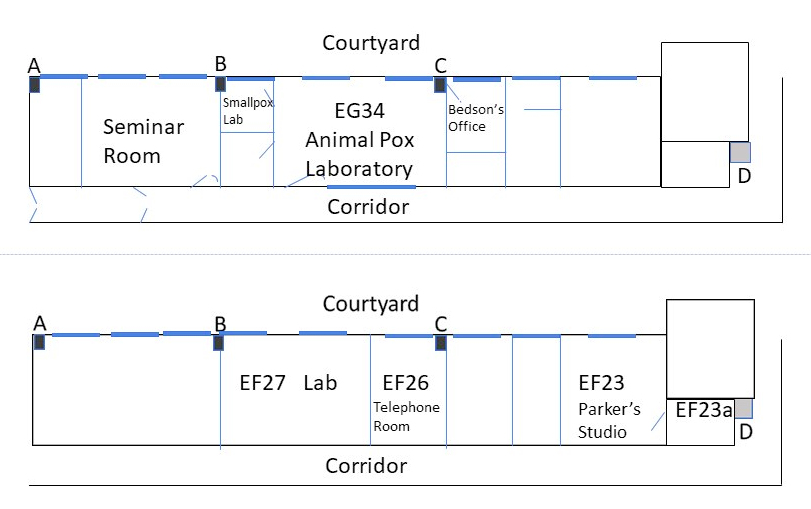
Schematic diagram of the East Wing of Birmingham University Medical School in 1978. The positions of the ventilation ducts are labelled A, B, C and D.

The inquiry's report noted that Bedson had failed to inform the authorities of changes in his research that could have affected safety. Shooter's enquiry discovered that the Dangerous Pathogens Advisory Group had inspected the laboratory on two occasions and each time recommended that the smallpox research be continued there, even though the facilities at the laboratory fell far short of those required by law. Several of the staff at the laboratory had received no special training. Inspectors from the WHO had told Bedson that the physical facilities at the laboratory did not meet WHO standards, but had nonetheless recommended only a few changes in laboratory procedures. Bedson misled the WHO about the volume of work handled by the laboratory, telling them that it had progressively declined since 1973, when in fact it had risen substantially as Bedson tried to finish his work before the laboratory closed. Shooter also found that while Parker had been vaccinated, it had not been done recently enough to protect her against smallpox. A foreword by the Secretary of State for Social Services, Patrick Jenkin, noted that the University of Birmingham disputed the report's findings.

The report concluded that Parker had been infected by a strain of smallpox virus called Abid (named after the three-year-old Pakistani boy from whom it had originally been isolated), which was being handled in the smallpox laboratory during 24–25 July 1978. It found that there was "no doubt" that Parker had been infected at her workplace, and identified three possible ways in which this could have occurred: air current transmission; personal contact; or contact with contaminated apparatus. The report favoured air current transmission and concluded that the virus could have travelled in air currents up a service duct from the laboratory below to a room in the Anatomy Department that was used for telephone calls. On 25 July, Parker had spent much more time there than usual ordering photographic materials because the financial year was about to end.

Since Shooter's Report potentially played an important role in the court case against the university for breach of safety legislation, its official publication was postponed until the outcome of the trial was known, and it was not published until 1980.

Once it was published, it had a significant impact. Shooter's report was debated by Parliament. Nicolas Hawkes wrote, in 1979, that:

Shooter's report was leaked to the press by Clive Jenkins, the general secretary of the trade union to which Mrs. Parker belonged. Shooter's report is one of the most damning documents ever produced by an official enquiry in Britain.

=== Prosecution ===
On 1 December 1978, the Health and Safety Executive announced their intention to prosecute the university for breach of safety legislation. The case was heard in October 1979 at Birmingham Magistrates' Court.

Although the source of infection was traced, the mode and cause of transmission was not. Evidence presented by several internationally recognised experts, including Kevin McCarthy, Allan Watt Downie and Keith R. Dumbell, showed that airborne transmission from the laboratory to the telephone room where Parker was supposedly infected was highly improbable. The experts calculated that it would require 53,700 litres (11,812 imp gal) of virus fluid to have been aspirated (meaning, in this context, removed by suction of fluid and cells through a needle) and it would take 20,000 years for one particle to travel to the telephone room at the rate the fluid was aspirated. It was additionally found that although the Shooter Inquiry noted the poor state of the duct sealing in the laboratory, this was caused after the outbreak by engineers fumigating the laboratory and ducts. The university was found not guilty of causing Parker's death.

=== Other litigation ===
In August 1981, following a formal claim for damages made by the trade union Association of Scientific, Technical and Managerial Staffs in 1979, Parker's husband, Joseph, was awarded £25,000 in compensation.

=== Conclusions and impact ===
Although it seems clear that the source of Parker's infection was the smallpox virus grown at the University of Birmingham Medical School laboratory, it remains unknown how Parker came to be infected. Shooter's criticisms of the laboratory's procedures triggered radical changes in how dangerous pathogens were studied in the UK, but the inquiry's conclusions on the transmission of the virus have not been generally accepted. Professor Mark Pallen, who wrote a book about the case, said that the air duct theory "was not really believed by anyone in the know". Brian Escott-Cox QC, who successfully defended the university in the subsequent prosecution, said in 2018:

It was clear to me before the case even started that we were going to be able to prove absolutely beyond any question of doubt whatsoever, that airborne infection of smallpox cannot take place other than between two people who are face to face, less than ten inches apart. Unhappily, inevitably, once you have proven beyond any question of doubt that the smallpox could not have escaped from the laboratory and gone to Janet Parker, the overwhelming inference is that Janet Parker must, in some way or other, have come to the smallpox. How that came about, I don't know, we shall never know, but I think from those facts it is an inevitable inference and nothing else really stands up to any commonsense view.

In light of this incident, all known stocks of smallpox were destroyed or transferred to one of two WHO reference laboratories which had BSL-4 facilities: the Centers for Disease Control and Prevention (CDC) in the United States and the State Research Center of Virology and Biotechnology VECTOR in Koltsovo, Russia.

At the time of the outbreak, the WHO had been about to certify that smallpox had been eradicated globally. It eventually did so in 1980.

== See also ==
- Rahima Banu, last person infected with naturally occurring Variola major
- Ali Maow Maalin, last person infected with naturally occurring Variola minor
- Surinder Singh Bakhshi
- List of unusual deaths in the 20th century

== Bibliography ==
- Altman, Lawrence K (11 February 1979). "Criticism Is Leveled in Aftermath of Fatal British Smallpox Outbreak". The New York Times. p. 34.
- Pallen, Mark (2018). The Last Days of Smallpox: Tragedy in Birmingham. UK: Amazon. ISBN 9781980455226.
- Shooter, R. A. (July 1980). Report of the investigation into the cause of the 1978 Birmingham smallpox occurrence (PDF) (Report). London: H.M. Stationery Office.
- Stockton, William (4 February 1979). "Smallpox Is Not Dead". The New York Times Magazine.
- Tucker, Jonathan B. (2002). Scourge: The Once and Future Threat of Smallpox (registration required). Grove Press. p. 127.
