= Coppetts Wood Hospital =

Former hospital in Muswell Hill, London

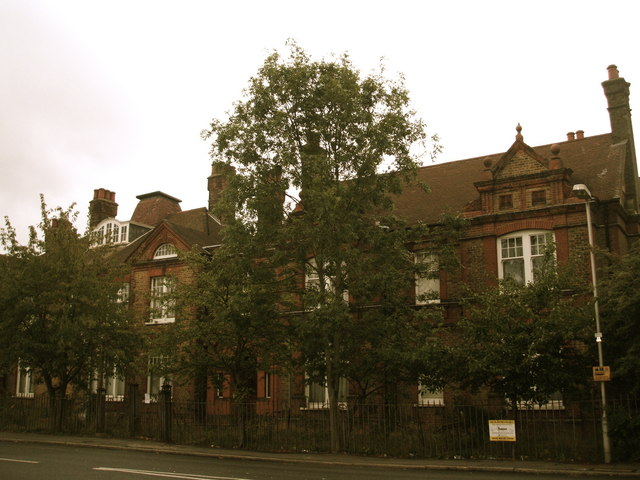
- Coppetts Wood Hospital

- Location within Haringey

Geography
- Location: London
- Coordinates: 51.6020°N 0.1539°W

Organisation
- Care system: NHS England
- Type: Specialist

Services
- Emergency department: No
- Speciality: Infectious diseases

History
- Founded: 1887
- Closed: 2008

Coppetts Wood Hospital was an infectious diseases isolation hospital in Muswell Hill, North London that operated from 1887 to 2008. It was used to treat, amongst other things, patients suffering from tuberculosis and Lassa fever.

== History ==
The hospital had its origins as an isolation hospital for residents in the Hornsey area, built by the Hornsey Local Board of Health (Municipal Borough of Hornsey). It was located close to Coppetts Wood in Muswell Hill, between 1887 and 1888.

It was extended in 1893-1894 and again in 1906. By 1913 it had 25 beds. In 1922 it expanded its intake to take patients from the Finchley and Wood Green. By 1927 it had 130 beds. It joined the National Health Service in 1948. It reached its peak capacity in 1954 with 144 beds.

In 1968 the infectious diseases department of the Royal Free Hospital transferred to the hospital. However, in 2000 most of the hospitals services transferred back to the Royal Free Hospital and Coppetts Wood Hospital remained only as a small infectious diseases ward which finally closed, and with it the hospital itself, in 2008.

In 2000, an aid worker was hospitalised there with Lassa fever and died, and in 2003, a British soldier was hospitalised there suffering from Lassa fever.

== Demolition of buildings ==
The last of the buildings at the Coppets Wood Hospital site were demolished in 2019 by the developers Catalyst Housing. A new housing estate now occupies the site.
