= Gamer Network =

British digital media company

Gamer Network Limited
- Formerly: Eurogamer Network Limited (1999–2013)
- Type: Subsidiary
- Industry: Digital media
- Founded: 1999; 27 years ago
- Founders: Rupert Loman; Nick Loman
- Headquarters: London, England
- Key people: Simon Maxwell (MD)
- Parent: ReedPop (2018–2024); IGN Entertainment (2024–present)
- Website: gamer.network

Gamer Network Limited (formerly Eurogamer Network Limited) is a British digital media company based in London. Founded in 1999 by Rupert and Nick Loman, it owns brands—primarily editorial websites—relating to video game journalism and other video game businesses. Its flagship website, Eurogamer, was launched alongside the company. It began hosting the video game trade show EGX in 2008. ReedPop acquired Gamer Network in 2018 and sold it to IGN Entertainment in 2024.

== History ==
Gamer Network was founded under the name Eurogamer Network in 1999 by brothers Rupert and Nick Loman. It was formed alongside the opening of its flagship website, Eurogamer, which itself launched on 4 September 1999. Nick Loman left the business in 2004 to pursue a career in medicine and "competitive BBQ".

In February 2011, Eurogamer Network acquired American publishing house Hammersuit, alongside its IndustryGamers.com and Modojo.com websites. On 1 March 2013, in line with the international expansion, Eurogamer Network announced that it had changed its name to Gamer Network. As part of the rebranding, Eurogamer Events was renamed Gamer Events, while Hammersuit also adopted the Gamer Network name. In October, Simon Maxwell was promoted from group publishing director to chief operating officer.

On 26 February 2018, it was announced that ReedPop, the division of Reed Exhibitions that organises pop culture conventions such as PAX, had acquired Gamer Network. While Rupert Loman remained Gamer Network's chief executive officer, Maxwell became the company's managing director and a vice-president for ReedPop's UK operations. Loman left the company in February 2020. ReedPop implemented a number of layoffs across many of the Gamer Network sites in September 2020. In November 2020, the remaining USgamer staff, which had been reduced from nine to four after the earlier layoffs, reported that ReedPop was shuttering the site by the end of the year.

In November 2023, ReedPop announced its intent to sell Gamer Network with its editorial brands, though excluding its events business. IGN Entertainment was announced as the buyer in May 2024, and it immediately implemented layoffs of some editorial staff at GamesIndustry.biz and Rock Paper Shotgun. Following the takeover, Dicebreaker cancelled their Tabletop Creators Summit at MCM Comic Con. In an overview on the state of tabletop gaming journalism, Chase Carter of Rascal News highlighted that "the other professional website that fostered amateur talent, Dicebreaker, seems to be poised on the edge of collapse". Carter, who formerly freelanced for Dicebreaker, commented that nothing has been published since the May 21 sale of the Gamer Network and the outlet's "ultimate fate remains unknown at time of writing" in June 2024. Later that month, the Dicebreaker staff reported that they were made redundant.

Further redundances following in February 2026, where members of Eurogamer's editorial staff, including its entire video team, were laid off. This followed after the majority of VG247's staff were moved to Eurogamer in Summer 2025, with the former left staffed only by a pair of full-time writers.

== List of brands ==
=== Owned ===
- Eurogamer – Gamer Network's flagship website for video game news; launched in 1999 alongside the company. The Eurogamer brand is licensed to six regional sub-outlets, which report in their region's languages. Its editor-in-chief is Chris Tapsell.
- GamesIndustry.biz – A website focused on the business aspects of the video game industry; launched on Eurogamer in 2002. IndustryGamers.com was merged into it in 2012. Its editor-in-chief is James Batchelor.
- Outside Xbox and Outside Xtra – YouTube channels focusing on Xbox and non-Xbox game news; the former launched in 2012 by Andy Farrant, Mike Channell and Jane Douglas, three editors of other Xbox-focused outlets, and the latter launched in 2016 by Outside Xbox, Ellen Rose, and Luke Westaway, writer and presenter of Xbox On, and Senior Editor at CNET, respectively.
- Rock Paper Shotgun – A website focused on personal computer game news launched in 2007 by Kieron Gillen, Alec Meer, John Walker and Jim Rossignol; partnered with Eurogamer Network in 2010 and acquired by it in 2017. Its editor-in-chief is Katharine Castle.
- VG247 – A video game news site formed in 2008 in a partnership between Eurogamer Network and Patrick Garratt. Reduced to a token staff in 2025 following the purchase of Gamer Network by Ziff Davis.

==== Former ====
- Dicebreaker – A board game and tabletop role-playing game news and reviews website and YouTube channel launched in August 2019. Dicebreaker launched the Tabletop Awards in 2022 and the Tabletop Creators Summit in 2023. The site was reportedly discontinued and staff including editor-in-chief Matt Jarvis were made redundant in June 2024 following the sale of the Gamer Network.
- Gamer Creative – Gamer Network's in-house creative agency; founded and headed by Josh Heaton.
- Gamer's Edition – A project that produces merchandise and special edition releases for video games; launched in 2013, its first projects were special editions for Papers, Please and a compilation of Hotline Miami and Hotline Miami 2: Wrong Number.
- Jelly Deals – A website highlighting sales for video games; launched in 2016.
- Metabomb – A video game news website with emphasis on esports; launched in 2013.
- USgamer (USG) – Aimed at the United States, a sister site to Eurogamer; launched in 2013 and shut down in 2020. After closure, the website's content was migrated to VG247.

=== Partnered ===
- Nintendo Life – A website focused on news and reviews of Nintendo products, including video games and software, owned and operated by Hookshot Media (formerly Nlife Media). It has sections covering the Nintendo Switch 2, Nintendo Switch, Wii U, Wii, Nintendo 3DS, Nintendo DSi, WiiWare, DSiWare and classic titles re-released through Nintendo's Virtual Console games. It was founded in late 2005, acquired the sites WiiWare World and Virtual Console Reviews in April 2009, and partnered with Gamer Network (then Eurogamer Network) in 2011. In 2015 the site expanded its YouTube channel to receive regular content. Its editor is Gavin Lane.
- Mod DB and Indie DB – A database website for video game modifications; launched in 2002 and partnered with Gamer Network in 2015. And sister site for Mod DB that covers indie games; launched by Mod DB in 2010 and partnered with Gamer Network alongside Mod DB in 2015.
- Push Square – A website focused on PlayStation game news; launched in 2012 by Nintendo Life. Its Editor is Sammy Barker.
- Pure Xbox – A website focused in Xbox game news; relaunched in 2020 by Nlife Media.
- Time Extension – A website focused on retrogaming; launched in 2022 by Hookshot Media. Its Editor-in-Chief is Damien McFerran.
- Video Games Chronicle (VGC) – A spiritual successor to magazine Computer and Video Games; launched in partnership with Gamer Network in 2019 by a team led by Andy Robinson.
- Partnered video channels including Arekkz Gaming, Westie and FamilyGamerTV.
