= Nick Loman =

British virologist

Nick loman
- Born: Nicholas James Loman; February 1979 (age 47); Brighton, England
- Education: Queen Mary University of London
- Scientific career
- Fields: Microbiology
- Workplaces: University of Birmingham
- Doctoral advisor: Mark Pallen

Nicholas James Loman (born February 1979) is the co-founder of the Gamer Network with his brother Rupert, which they started under the name Eurogamer Network in 1999. Nick left the business in 2004 to pursue a career in medicine.

Loman studied medicine at Queen Mary University of London. He undertook an intercalated BSc degree in Pathology (Infection & Immunity) from Imperial College in 2001 and graduated in Medicine from Queen Mary University of London in 2004. He then spent some time as junior doctor, before working as a bioinformatician in Mark Pallen's research group at the University of Birmingham from 2007 to 2012, where gained a PhD in Comparative Bacterial Genomics. On completing his thesis, Loman developed an interest in emerging viral infections, using Nanopore sequencing to track the spread of Ebola in the Western African Ebola virus epidemic. During the COVID-19 pandemic, he played a key role in establishing bioinformatics workflows for genomic analysis of severe acute respiratory syndrome coronavirus 2.

Since 2017, Loman has been professor of microbial genomics and bioinformatics at the Institute for Microbiology and Infection at the University of Birmingham. He is also a fellow of the Alan Turing Institute.
