= River Ambulance Service =

Transport for smallpox patients in London

Ambulance steamer Geneva Cross in 1894

The River Ambulance Service was established in London by the Metropolitan Asylums Board to transport patients with smallpox to isolation hospitals. Paddle steamers such as the Geneva Cross were used as ambulance steamers.
