= William Kirkpatrick Riland Bedford =

English clergyman, author, and cricketer

Rev. William Kirkpatrick Riland Bedford (1826–1905) was an English clergyman and author, known as an antiquary and genealogist, and also as a cricketer.

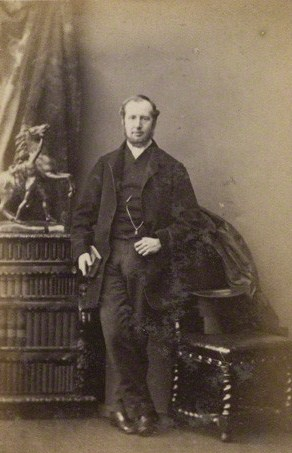
William Kirkpatrick Riland Bedford, 1861 photo

== Life ==
Born at Sutton Coldfield rectory on 12 July 1826, he was eldest of five sons of William Riland Bedford the rector, by his wife Grace Campbell, daughter of Charles Sharpe of Hoddam, Dumfriesshire; Charles Kirkpatrick Sharpe was his mother's brother. After education at Sutton Coldfield grammar school, Bedford won a Queen's scholarship at Westminster School in 1840, and qualified for a studentship at Christ Church, Oxford. An attack of scarlet fever made him miss that chance, and on 6 June 1844 he matriculated as a commoner at Brasenose College. In 1847 he was secretary of the Oxford Union Society when Lord Dufferin was president. He graduated B.A. in 1848 and proceeded M.A. in 1852.

In 1849 Bedford was ordained to the curacy of Southwell, Nottinghamshire, and in 1850 he succeeded his uncle, Dr. Williamson, as rector of Sutton Coldfield. He held the post for 42 years, and was rural dean for 25. He commissioned the house that eventually became the core of Good Hope Hospital for his son, W.C. Riland Bedford.

Bedford died at Cricklewood on 23 January 1905; his ashes were buried after cremation at Golders Green.

== Works ==
Bedford wrote on the antiquities of Sutton Coldfield in Three Hundred Years of a Family Living, being a History of the Rilands of Sutton Coldfield (1889), and The Manor of Sutton, Feudal and Municipal (1901). He was a frequent contributor to Notes and Queries. From 1878 to 1902 he was chaplain of the order of St. John of Jerusalem, and in his capacity of official genealogist he compiled works dealing with the history and regulations of the Knights Hospitallers, including Malta and the Knights (1870; 2nd edit. 1894), Notes on the Old Hospitals of the Order of St. John of Jerusalem (1881), and a history of the English Hospitallers (1902) in collaboration with R. Holbeche.

Other publications were: a Memoir of Charles Kirkpatrick Sharpe, his uncle, written from family papers (1888); The Blazon of Episcopacy (1858; 2nd edit. 1897); and Outcomes of Old Oxford (1899).

== Sport ==
Bedford was a keen cricketer in the early days of the game. On 20 July 1856 he founded the Free Foresters, an amateur wandering club with headquarters at Sutton Coldfield, and he recorded the fortunes of the club in his Annals of the Free Foresters from 1856 (1895). He was also an archer, and attended the meetings of the Woodmen of Arden at Meriden, Warwickshire, winning the Arden medal on 16 July 1857. In 1885 he published Records of the Woodmen of Arden from 1785, and contributed to the volume Archery in the Badminton series (1894).

== Family ==
Bedford married:

1. on 18 September 1851, Maria Amy, youngest daughter of Joseph Houson (died 1890) of Southwell, Nottinghamshire;
2. in 1900, Margaret, daughter of Denis Browne.

There were seven sons and three daughters of the first marriage.

== Notes ==
Attribution

This article incorporates text from a publication now in the public domain: Lee, Sidney, ed. (1912). "Bedford, William Kirkpatrick Riland". Dictionary of National Biography (2nd supplement). Vol. 1. London: Smith, Elder & Co.
