= City of Birmingham Fire Brigade =

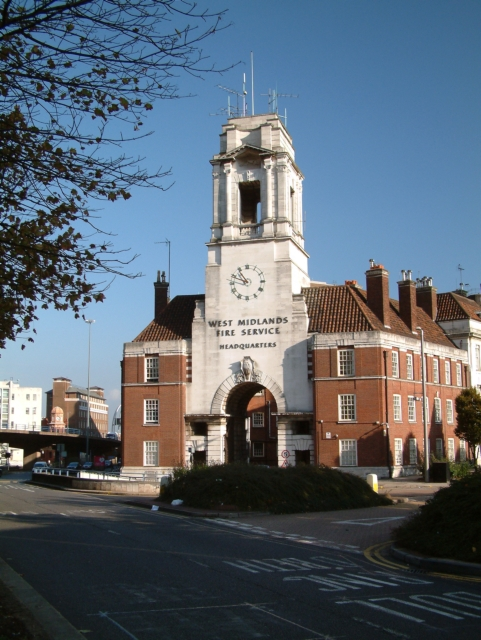
The former Birmingham Central Fire Station, Lancaster Circus, seen in 2005

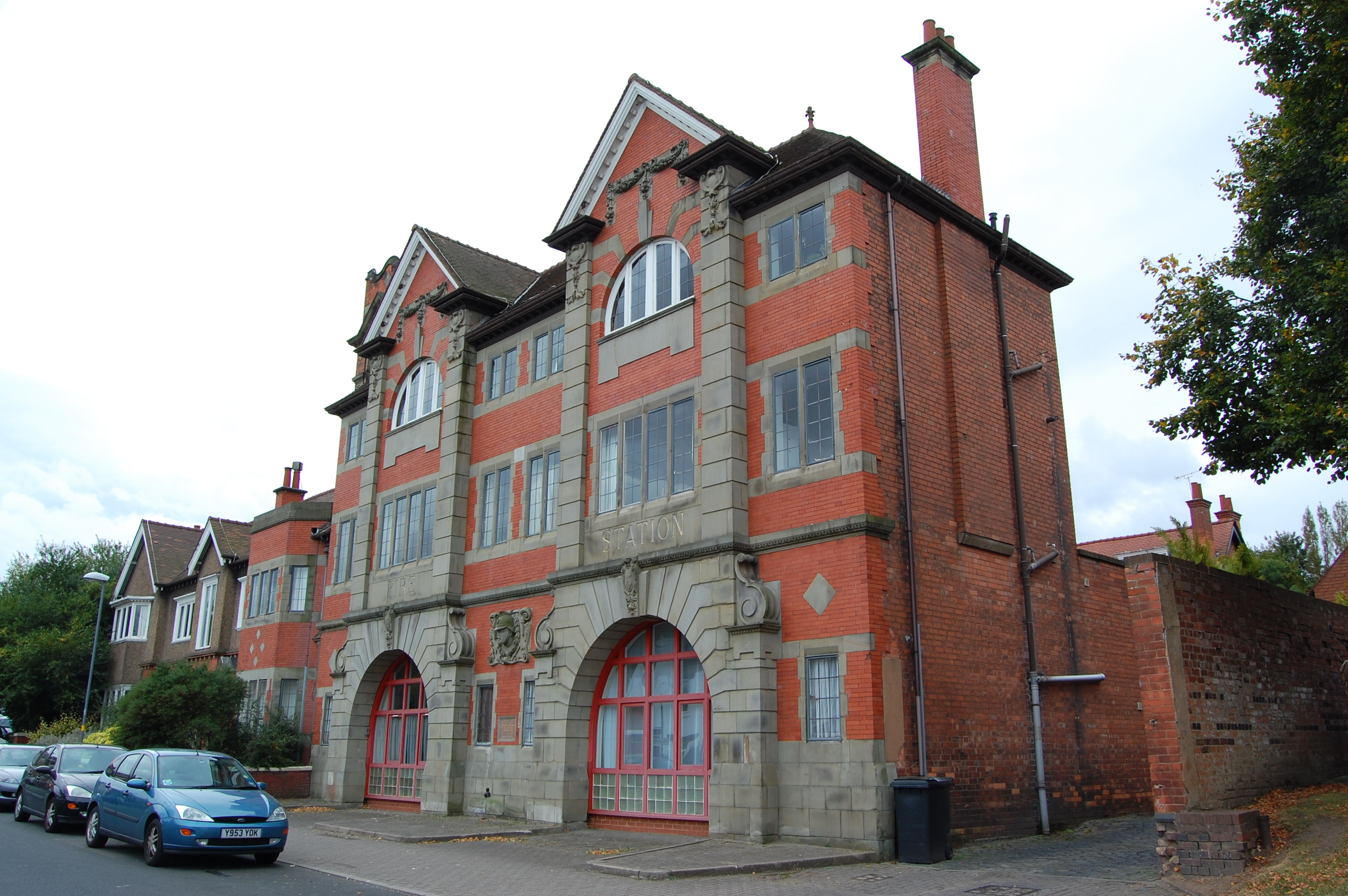
The former City of Birmingham fire station at Harborne

The City of Birmingham Fire Brigade was founded in 1875. In 1895 a new chief officer was appointed, Alfred Robert Tozer (senior). He died in 1906 when he was followed into position by his son Alfred Robert Tozer (junior) who continued in the position until 1940. Alfred Robert Tozer (senior) was formerly employed by Merryweather & Sons of Long Acre and Greenwich, London, where he had designed fire pumps.

The Birmingham Fire Brigade was merged with other fire brigades to form the National Fire Service in 1941, and then reformed in 1948 as the Birmingham Fire and Ambulance Service.

In 1967, the brigade was responsible for the deliberate destruction by fire of Witton Isolation Hospital, which had been used to treat people with Smallpox.

The Birmingham Fire and Ambulance Service remained in existence until 1974 when it was amalgamated with other fire brigades in the West Midlands area to form the West Midlands Fire Service with the headquarters at Lancaster Circus, in Birmingham.
