= International Journal of Antimicrobial Agents =

- Discipline: Antimicrobials
- Language: English
- Edited by: J.M. Rolain

Standard abbreviations
- ISO 4: Int. J. Antimicrob. Agents

Indexing
- ISSN: 0924-8579

Links
- Journal homepage

The International Journal of Antimicrobial Agents is a scientific journal published by the International Society of Chemotherapy since 1991. For 10 years its Editor-in-Chief was Alasdair Macintosh Geddes, until his retirement in 2015.
