= Witton Isolation Hospital =

- Shown in West Midlands

Geography
- Location: Kingstanding, Birmingham, England
- Coordinates: 52.539353°N 1.872525°W

Organisation
- Care system: NHS (from 1948)
- Type: Quarantine

History
- Founded: 1894
- Closed: 1966

Witton Isolation Hospital was a facility for the treatment and quarantine of smallpox victims and their contacts in Birmingham, England, from 1894 to 1966.

== History ==
=== Operation ===
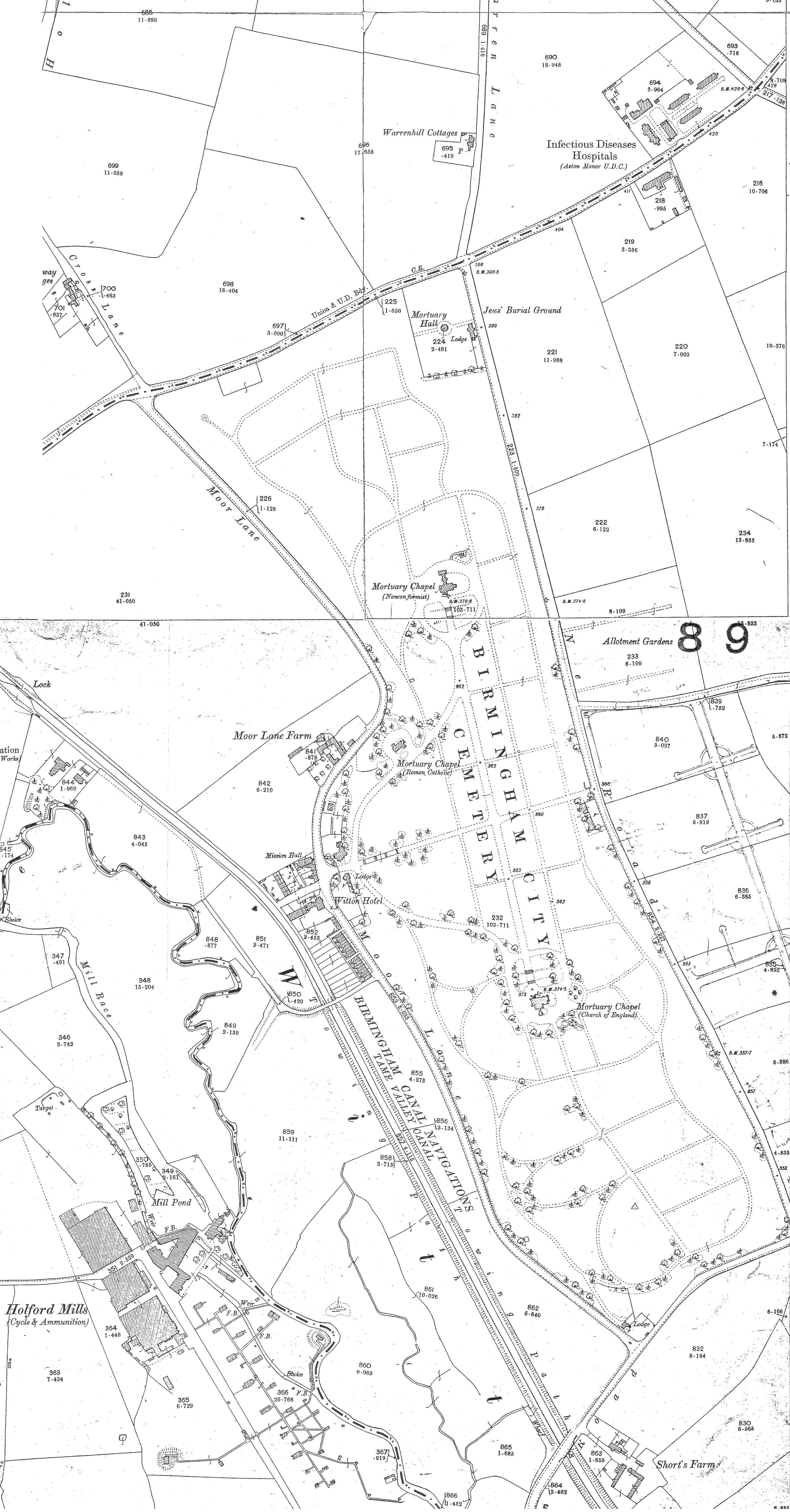
1903 Ordnance Survey map; the location of the hospital is shown in the top right corner.

Built in 1894, Witton Isolation Hospital was initially in a semi-rural district but by the 1930s the site was surrounded by the newly built Kingstanding and Perry Common social housing developments. It occupied the site now enclosed by College Road, Brackenbury Road and Plumstead Road.

Witton Isolation Hospital was used sporadically during the 20th century including the outbreak of smallpox that occurred in the city in 1962. The last cases quarantined there were during January and February 1966, following an outbreak that originated at the University of Birmingham Medical School. Witton Isolation Hospital was eventually superseded by the UK's first National Isolation Hospital, established at nearby Catherine-de-Barnes in 1966.

On 4 May 1966, the last patient was discharged. During its life as a first-line smallpox hospital Witton had a resident caretaker, but on 2 May 1966 the caretaker resigned. His departure left the facility of ten buildings unguarded, except for the ten feet high perimeter wall. In the middle of 1966, local children broke in, causing some vandalism.

=== Disposal ===
==== Burning of the building ====
After the incident involving children breaking into Witton Isolation Hospital in mid-1966, Birmingham's Chief Medical Officer, Ernest Millar, was contacted by a local resident who had regularly seen the children from the top seats of a double-decker bus.

Millar eventually ordered the facility to be destroyed by fire and on 3 May 1967 – chosen because the wind was blowing from the south, away from the city centre – the buildings were set ablaze by firemen of the Birmingham Fire and Ambulance Service, under the supervision of William Nicholls, Deputy Chief Medical Officer, and George Merrill, Deputy Chief Fire Officer, accompanied by representatives of the news media. All personnel involved in the operation had to wear protective clothing and be inoculated. Four tons of flammable material, including kerosene, waste oil and aluminium powder accelerants, were needed to burn the buildings, which were then empty. All windows were kept open to assist the fire spreading. A virologist from the UK government microbiology laboratories at Porton Down (then part of the Ministry of Defence), was asked to conduct tests to assess the efficiency of the conflagration.

==== Political aftermath ====
The affair was discussed in Parliament. Harold Gurden, Member of Parliament for the Selly Oak constituency in Birmingham, asked the Parliamentary Secretary to the Ministry of Health, Julian Snow, how such a danger could have occurred in "a densely populated area", why the local residents had not been informed, whether the facility was going to be replaced and what evidence there was of the destruction of any remaining sources of smallpox virus by the fire.

In his reply, Julian Snow said:

that the Microbiological Research Station at Porton, Salisbury, was asked by the senior administrative medical officer of the hospital board and the medical officer of health for the City of Birmingham to investigate the possibilities of smallpox virus surviving at Witton Hospital, and 26 samples of material from the hospital wards and drainage system were examined for smallpox virus, and no clear evidence has so far been obtained to indicate the presence of smallpox virus from any of the samples... it seems to be in the nature of small boys that they are tempted to break into empty buildings and go climbing where they should not.

=== Later history of the site ===
In October 1967 an application to redevelop the site for housing was made to the Birmingham City Council, which was approved by the Council in February 1968.
