= Julie Moore =

British health administrator

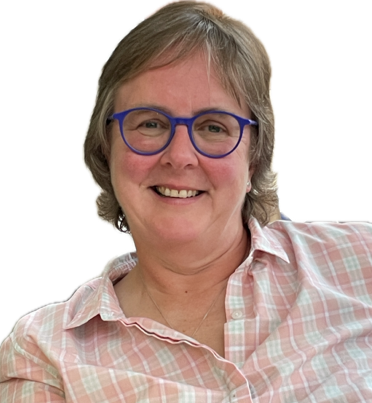
Picture of Julie Moore in June 2023

Dame Julie Moore DBE has been Chair of Health Data Research UK (HDRUK) since September 2023.

She was the Chief Executive of University Hospitals Birmingham NHS Foundation Trust from 2006 to 2018. She was a trustee of the King Charles III Charitable Fund until 2024.

She was on the Organising Committee of the 2022 Commonwealth Games which were held in Birmingham.

She spent ten years as a nurse in clinical practice before moving into nursing management. She became a director of Leeds Teaching Hospitals NHS Trust in 1998. In 2002 she moved to University Hospitals Birmingham NHS Foundation trust as Chief Operating Officer, and was appointed as Chief Executive in 2006.

She was made a Dame Commander of the Order of the British Empire (DBE) in the 2012 New Year Honours and was one of the top ten Chief Executives in the NHS in 2013 according to the Health Service Journal. In 2013, she was awarded an Honorary Chair at Warwick University, and was included in the BBC Radio 4's Woman's Hour list of the 100 most powerful women in the UK. In 2015 she was said to be amongst the most influential people in the English NHS, and the same year the Health Service Journal judged her as the third to top Chief Executive in the National Health Service, and in 2016 the second.

Moore has honorary degrees from the University of Birmingham, Birmingham City University, Oxford Brookes University and Aston University. She has spoken on various radio and TV programmes including Newsnight.

Moore is currently a non executive director at Worcestershire Acute Hospitals NHS Trust, which she joined on 1 October 2018, and is an associate or advisor of several other organisations.

Moore lives in Birmingham with her wife. She spoke about being a lesbian working in the NHS during her BBC Radio 4 Woman’s Hour interview and has chaired or spoken at a number of conferences or sessions looking at equality and diversity, gender and sexuality.
