= University Hospitals Birmingham NHS Foundation Trust =

NHS hospital trust

- Type: NHS Foundation Trust
- Region served: West Midlands
- Hospitals: Good Hope Hospital; Heartlands Hospital; Queen Elizabeth Hospital Birmingham; Solihull Hospital
- Chair: Dame Yve Buckland
- Chief executive: Jonathan Brotherton
- Website: www.uhb.nhs.uk

The University Hospitals Birmingham NHS Foundation Trust provides adult district general hospital services for Birmingham as well as specialist treatments for the West Midlands.

The trust operates the Queen Elizabeth Hospital in Edgbaston (QEHB), adjacent to its older namesake and connected to it by a footbridge. QEHB began receiving patients at its Emergency Department on 16 June 2010, and replaced Queen Elizabeth Hospital and Selly Oak Hospital. The trust is under the leadership of Chair Dame Yve Buckland and chief executive Jonathan Brotherton On 30 June 2004, the Trust received authorisation to become one of the first NHS Foundation Trusts in England, under the leadership of ex-chief executive Dame Julie Moore, who succeeded Mark Britnell. From 2006 to November 2013 the Chair of the Trust was Sir Albert Bore. Former Home Secretary Jacqui Smith took over as chair in December 2013.

On 1 April 2018 it merged with the Heart of England NHS Foundation Trust. The combined organisation will have a turnover of £1.6 billion and 2,700 beds across four main hospitals.

== Development ==
In December 2013 it emerged that the Trust was interested in expanding into Primary Care, a proposal which was not welcomed by all the local General Practitioners.

In 2013 the trust established a subsidiary company, UHB Facilities Ltd, to which three staff were transferred. The intention was to achieve VAT benefits which arise because NHS trusts can only claim VAT back on a small subset of goods and services they buy. The Value Added Tax Act 1994 provides a mechanism through which NHS trusts can qualify for refunds on contracted out services.

The trust has one of the 11 Genomics Medicines Centres associated with Genomics England which were planned to open across England in February 2014. All the data produced in the 100,000 Genomes project will be made available to drugs companies and researchers to help them create precision drugs for future generations.

It is one of the biggest providers of specialised services in England, which generated an income of £327.7 million in 2014/5.

It arranged a deal with Hospital Corporation of America in 2017 to build 138 bed specialist hospital on the trust's Edgbaston campus. The £65 million development will have 66 private beds, run by HCA Healthcare, and 72 NHS beds, run by the trust, a new radiotherapy unit and operating theatres. Construction, by Vinci Construction UK started in May 2019.

The Department of Health and Social Care lent the combined trust £162 million in May 2018, £87 million was for a new ambulatory care and diagnostics centre at Heartlands Hospital.

The trust opened an office in Beijing in October 2018, hoping to find business opportunities in China, which could include consultancy, the trust's in-house clinical software, and advice about the construction of new hospitals.

In May 2019 it was negotiating with Babylon Health with plans to use the technology for virtual outpatient consultations, chronic disease management, and triage both before and after patients arrived at the emergency department using Babylon's symptom checker app. The ambition was that the symptom checker could refer patients directly to specialist clinics, avoiding its accident & emergency (A&E) department. The Birmingham Local Medical Committee said this was "a truly frightening prospect that is going to be nothing but massively damaging for healthcare in Birmingham".

The trust was one of the biggest beneficiaries of capital funding for the NHS in August 2019, with an allocation of £97.1 million for a purpose built building for outpatient, treatment and diagnostic services.

It began trials of a Remote Diagnostic Station in 2020. This enables multi-disciplinary teams to give remote clinical support using digital stethoscopes and ECGs to review and provide diagnoses for patients.

During the COVID pandemic, the trust made numerous changes and reorganisations to its hospital services to ensure patient care in safe environments while also treating COVID-19 patients. In March 2020, a Birmingham children's A&E department was temporarily shut. In April 2020 supportive care and chemotherapy treatment of cancer patients was relocated to Solihull. At the same time Heartlands Hospital's Gynaecology Assessment Unit was temporarily moved to Good Hope with home-birth services being suspended.

In June 2021, a senior delegation of NHS England and NHSX visited University Hospitals Birmingham to assess the feasibility of a comprehensive extension of an AI triage model, based on that used by Babylon, which had already been used by NHS University Hospitals Birmingham NHS Foundation Trust (UHB) since April 2020.

In October 2021, Professor David Rosser, chief executive at University Hospitals Birmingham NHS Foundation Trust, at the Digital Health's Autumn Leadership Summit reported that the trusts' digital programmes, which included Babylon's Ask A&E chat service had cut the number of preventable hospital visits by 63%.

In December 2021, as the Trust reported an increase of nearly 50% demand on A&E to pre-pandemic levels, as well as highlighting its knock-on effect that COVID-19 had on ward space and how COVID-19 measures affected patient flow through A&E, it increased capacity opening two additional wards at Good Hope, Heartlands and Queen Elizabeth hospitals as well as further theatres at Solihull Hospital as the ‘cold’ Covid-free site for elective surgery.

In January 2022 it became known that the Trust had submitted plans to Birmingham City Council to build a top-class training centre at Good Hope Hospital, which was needed due to the increased number of medical students. The £1.9 million investment would provide support to existing and future staff as well as the local community.

== Performance ==
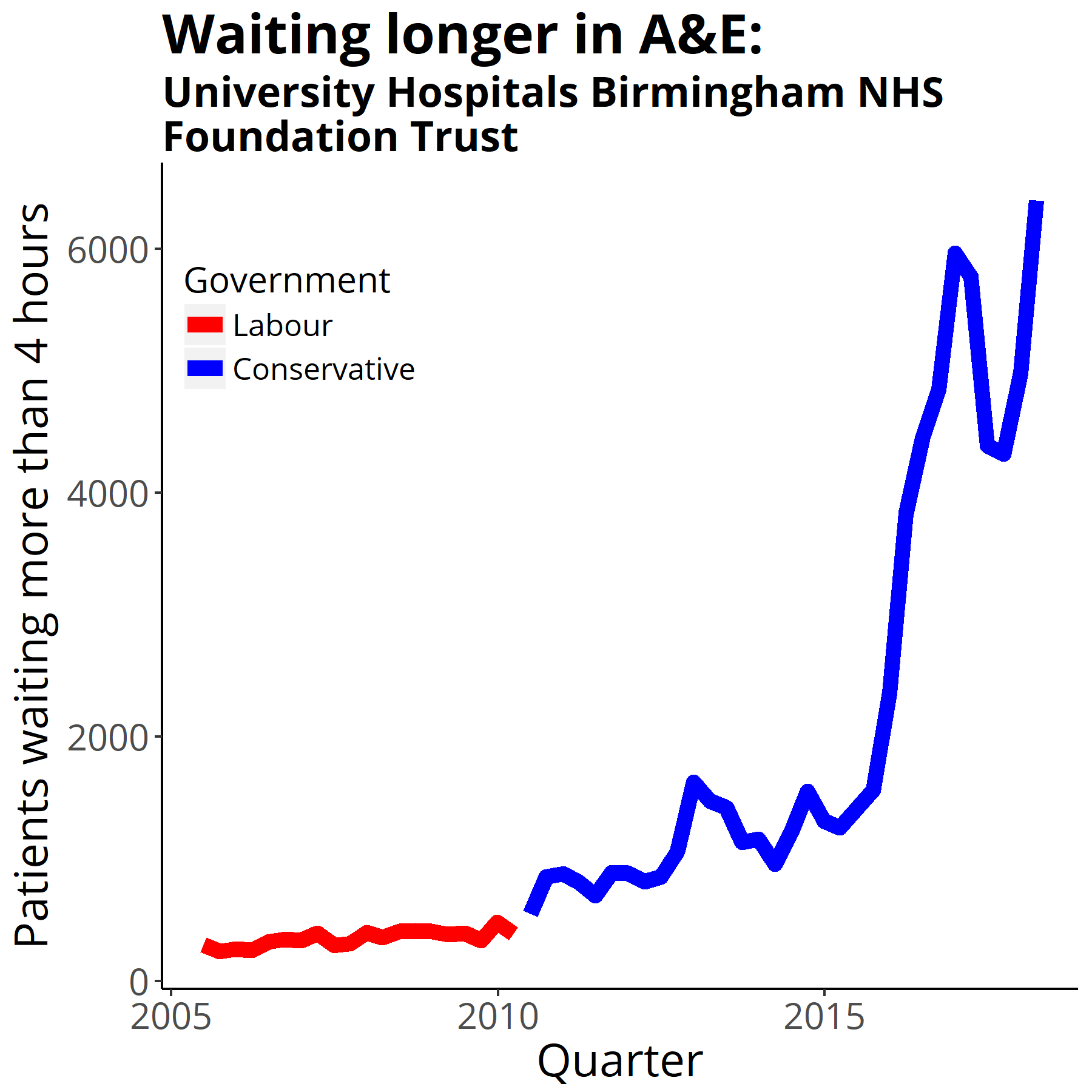
Four-hour target in the emergency department quarterly figures from NHS England data

In December 2013 the Trust was one of thirteen hospital trusts named by Dr Foster Intelligence as having higher than expected mortality indicator scores for the period April 2012 to March 2013 in their Hospital Guide 2013.

In August 2014 the trust wrote to local Clinical Commissioning Groups advising them that it would no longer accept referrals into pain, dermatology and general surgery from GPs outside the boundary of the trust because of capacity problems. The Trust had been forced to fully re-open the former Queen Elizabeth Hospital, which was supposed to be closed after the new site was opened in 2010. In October 2014 Julie Moore called for a major overhaul of financial rules to help popular hospitals cope with the extra demand their reputations attract.

The trust expected to finish 2015–16 with a deficit of more than £31 million as a result of changes to the NHS tariff.

In June 2014 the trust reported that Accident and Emergency Department activity had continued to rise with more than 102,000 attendances, a 4.9% increase over the previous year.

It was named by the Health Service Journal as one of the top hundred NHS trusts to work for in 2015. At that time it had 7712 full-time equivalent staff and a sickness absence rate of 3.86%. 82% of staff recommend it as a place for treatment and 70% recommended it as a place to work.

In March 2016 the Trust's cardiac surgery service was heavily criticised in a Care Quality Commission report, having been identified as a significant mortality outlier when compared to similar services.

In September 2016, the trust was selected by NHS England as one of twelve Global Digital Exemplars.

Birmingham was close to target for planned operations and care but missed targets for seeing A&E patients within 4 hours and also missed targets for cancer care which should start within 62 days.

In December 2019, as the Trust plummeted to its lowest performance, amongst the worst nationally, in their treatment of A&E patients it encouraged patients to consult Ask A&E for guidance on where to go after providing their symptoms.

In July 2021, the General Medical Council issued a warning to the trust's then medical director David Rosser after falsely reporting to the regulator that he was not aware that a doctor he referred in 2017 was a whistleblower. They stated that his action risked "bringing the profession into disrepute". The GMC took no further action against the doctor reported and they went on to win an employment tribunal for wrongful dismissal.

The board is ethnically diverse with 7 out of 17 directors from ethnic minority groups. There has not been a director who was not white in the last 20 years. In 2017, 36% of the trust's overall workforce were from a BAME background and in 2020 about half the medical staff.

== Overseas patients ==
The trust issued invoices to patients thought to be ineligible for NHS treatment totalling £2.3 million in 2018–9, but only collected £0.5 million.

== See also ==
- List of NHS trusts
- Healthcare in West Midlands
