= Good Hope Hospital =

Hospital in Birmingham, England

- University Hospitals Birmingham NHS Foundation Trust
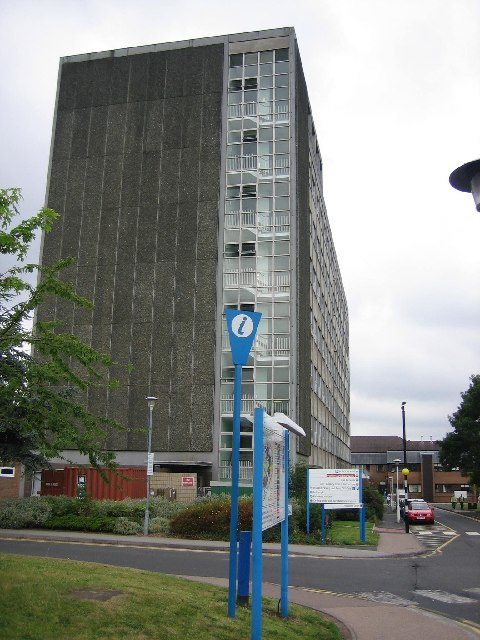
- Good Hope Hospital

- Location within West Midlands

Geography
- Location: Sutton Coldfield, Birmingham, West Midlands, England, United Kingdom
- Coordinates: 52.567°N 1.812°W

Organisation
- Care system: Public NHS
- Type: General / Teaching
- Affiliated university: University of Birmingham Medical School

Services
- Emergency department: Yes Accident & Emergency
- Beds: 512

History
- Founded: 1943

Links
- Website: hgs.uhb.nhs.uk/good-hope-hospital/
- Lists: Hospitals in England

Good Hope Hospital is a teaching hospital in the Sutton Coldfield area of Birmingham, England. Covering north Birmingham and south east Staffordshire, it is managed by the University Hospitals Birmingham NHS Foundation Trust.

== History ==
The hospital has its origins in a Victorian house built for the Rev. Riland Bedford, the local rector, in 1882. Originally known as Broomieclose, it became known as Good Hope House after a change of ownership in 1912. It was converted into a convalescent centre in 1943 and two single-storey wards were added in the 1950s to act as a facility for the potential evacuation of patients from Birmingham in the event of a nuclear attack. The Sheldon Unit and the Fothergill Block were added in 1967, the Richard Salt Unit opened in 1971 and new facilities for endoscopy, outpatients and diagnostic services followed in 2005.

== Services ==
Good Hope is a teaching hospital with library and learning facilities in the Partnership Learning Centre, which is part-funded by the Medical School of the University of Birmingham. It has accident and emergency facilities.

In 2017 the Care Quality Commission rated the Good Hope Hospital as requiring improvement.

== See also ==
- List of hospitals in England
