= Catherine-de-Barnes =

Coordinates: 52.42040°N 1.73822°W

- Location within the West Midlands
- OS grid reference: SP179803
- Civil parish: Hampton in Arden
- Metropolitan borough: Solihull
- Metropolitan county: West Midlands
- Region: West Midlands
- Country: England
- Sovereign state: United Kingdom
- Post town: SOLIHULL
- Postcode district: B91, B92
- Police: West Midlands
- Fire: West Midlands
- Ambulance: West Midlands
- UK Parliament: Meriden and Solihull East

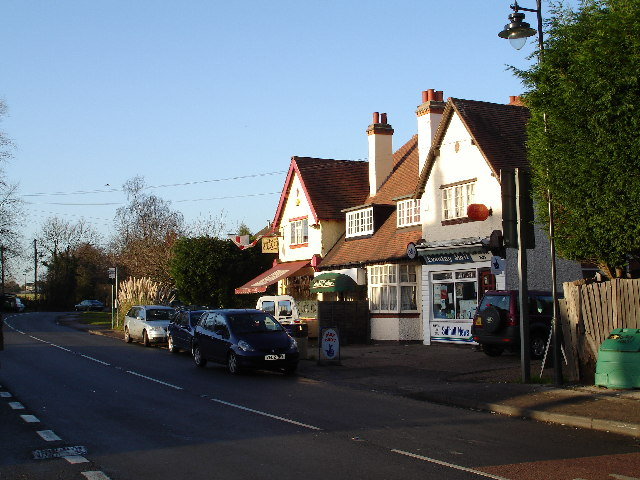
Shops in Catherine-de-Barnes

Catherine-de-Barnes (known to locals as Catney) is a small village within the Metropolitan Borough of Solihull in the English county of West Midlands. It is situated about 2.25 miles (3.6 km) east of Solihull town centre, in the civil parish of Hampton in Arden, and 2 miles (3.2 km) west of Hampton village. Population as taken in the 2011 census can be found under Bickenhill.

The National Exhibition Centre is 3.25 miles (5 km) to the northeast of the village and Birmingham Airport lies 3 miles (4.8 km) to the north.

== History ==
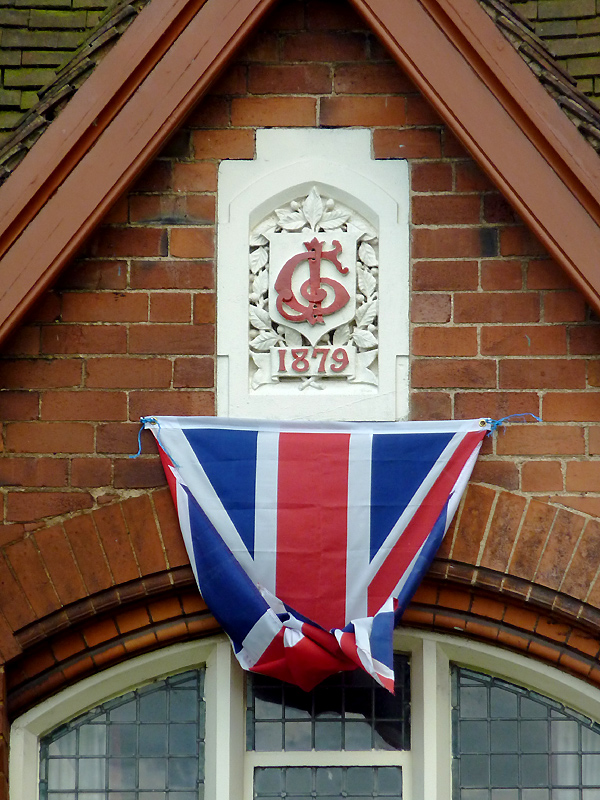
Founding stone at St Catherine's Church at Catherine de Barnes

Its name originates from Ketelberne, the man who owned it after the Norman Conquest in 1066. However it is mainly a later settlement probably dating from the building of the Grand Union Canal there and the present St Catherine's church, now a village hall, was built by Joseph Gillott in 1879.

== Isolation Hospital ==
In 1907, a "fever hospital" was built in Henwood Lane as a joint operation of the Solihull and Meriden Councils for isolating patients with infectious diseases such as diphtheria, typhoid fever and smallpox. In 1978, Janet Parker, the last known victim of smallpox in the world, died here. The hospital closed in the mid 1980s and in 1987 was converted to residential use.

== Governance ==
Catherine-de-Barnes was split between the unparished area of Solihull and the Hampton in Arden civil parish until 2019, when it became a ward of Hampton in Arden, to which the part in the unparished area was transferred.

== Transportation ==
The main road passing through the village is the east-west B4102 Hampton Lane/Solihull Road from Solihull to Hampton in Arden. The north-south B4438 Catherine de Barnes Lane starts 250m east of the village, leading to Bickenhill, and resuming at the junction with the A45 to serve the National Exhibition Centre, Birmingham Airport and Birmingham International station all of which are just 3 miles to the north.

The main bus route through the village (from 28 August 2022) Stagecoach 82 which operates hourly Mon-Sat between Coventry and Solihull.
