= Mark Pallen =

British microbiologist (born 1960)

- Born: Mark John Pallen; 1960 (age 65–66); Carshalton, England
- Education: Fitzwilliam College, Cambridge, London Hospital Medical College, Imperial College
- Scientific career
- Fields: Microbiology; Metagenomics; Evolution; Bioinformatics; Genomics; Nomenclature; Bacteriology
- Workplaces: London Hospital Medical College; Royal Free Hospital; St Bartholomew's Hospital Medical College; Queen's University Belfast; University of Birmingham; University of Warwick; Quadram Institute; University of East Anglia; University of Surrey
- Doctoral advisor: Gordon Dougan
- Doctoral students: Nick Loman
- Website: quadram.ac.uk/people/mark-pallen

Mark J. Pallen is a British microbiologist who is a research leader at the Quadram Institute and Professor of Microbial Genomics at the University of East Anglia. In recent years, he has been at the forefront of efforts to apply next-generation sequencing to problems in microbiology and ancient DNA research.

== Education ==
Pallen was educated at Wallington High School. He completed an undergraduate degree in medical sciences at Fitzwilliam College, Cambridge and gained his medical qualification from the London Hospital Medical College. During the early 1990s, he gained an MD while working at St Bartholomew's Hospital Medical College. In the mid-1990s, he worked for a PhD under the supervision of Gordon Dougan at Imperial College. During this time, he captained the winning team from Imperial College in the TV quiz show University Challenge, while also writing a series of articles for the British Medical Journal, introducing the medical profession to the Internet.

== Microbial genomics, metagenomics and bioinformatics ==
In 2011, Pallen led a crowdsourced analysis of the genome of the outbreak strain from the 2011 German E. coli O104:H4 outbreak, which had been genome-sequenced on the Ion Torrent platform by the BGI. Around the same time, he also led a project in which an isolate from the 2011 German E. coli O104:H4 outbreak was genome-sequenced on three new benchtop sequencing platforms, benchmarking these new platforms. He has also shown that whole-genome sequencing can be used to track the spread of resistant bacteria and to study the emergence of antimicrobial resistance .

Through analyses of fecal samples from the 2011 German E. coli O104:H4 outbreak and sputum samples from The Gambia, Pallen showed that metagenomics can be used as a culture-independent approach to the diagnosis of bacterial infection. He has pioneered the use of metagenomics to open up new avenues in ancient DNA research, recovering 200-year-old Mycobacterium tuberculosis genomes from human remains and a medieval Brucella genome sequence. With Vince Gaffney and Robin Allaby, he has applied shotgun metagenomics to sedimentary ancient DNA samples, showing the presence of wheat in the British Isles 2000 years earlier than expected. Pallen has also used metagenomics to investigate the chicken gut microbiome, the gut microbiome of patients on the intensive care unit and the microbes that inhabit ticks.

From 2014 to 2020, Pallen was Principal Investigator on the £8 million MRC-funded cloud-computing project the Cloud Infrastructure for Microbial Bioinformatics (CLIMB) and now serves as director of the successor project CLIMB-BIG-DATA. In 2020, the CLIMB project received the HPCWire Readers' Best High Performance Computing Collaboration Award for supporting analysis and publication of coronavirus genome sequences during the COVID-19 pandemic.

== Microbial nomenclature ==
Pallen's studies on the chicken gut microbiome led him to propose over 800 new names for bacterial taxa found in this setting. Pallen then developed a system for automating the creation of taxonomic names for bacteria, which resulted in the publication of over a million new names available for use by the microbiology research community to name new bacterial genera. Subsequently, in an opinion piece in the journal New Microbes and New Infections and an invited talk for Bergey's International Society for Microbial Systematics, Pallen outlined his ideas for making bacterial nomenclature more accessible. In 2022, Pallen published over 65,000 names for previously unnamed bacterial and archaeal taxa in the Genome Taxonomy Database, using Python scripts to create user-friendly arbitrary names that comply with the phonotactics and grammar of Latin.

Pallen has also been active in viral nomenclature, starting with the creation of over 400 species epithets for the bacterial positive-sense single-stranded viruses in the family Leviviridae. In March 2021, Pallen suggested in an Opinion article in New Scientist that an alternative should be found to the use of geographical names for variants of SARS-CoV-2, raiding the classical world for options. In early 2021, Pallen participated in a WHO working group, priming adoption of a scheme for naming variants of SARS-CoV-2 after letters in the Greek alphabet.

In recognition of Pallen's efforts in automating creation of names for microbes, in 2022 the name Palleniella was created for a new bacterial genus previously within the genus Prevotella.

== Public understanding of science ==
Pallen is the author of a popular science book, The Rough Guide to Evolution. In the wake of the 2005 Kitzmiller v. Dover Area School District trial, he wrote a review with Nick Matzke, outlining the evidence that the bacterial flagellum is an evolved rather than designed entity. He commissioned and peer-reviewed Baba Brinkman's Rap Guide to Evolution and was responsible for recruiting Alice Roberts to the role of Professor of Public Engagement in Science at the University of Birmingham. In June 2011, Pallen appeared in an episode of Melvin Bragg's In our Time radio programme.

In 2018, Pallen self-published a book on the 1978 smallpox outbreak in the United Kingdom, The Last Days of Smallpox: Tragedy in Birmingham, which includes a mixture of popular science and a historical narrative of the outbreak and subsequent court case. Pallen has served alongside Alice Roberts on the advisory board of the Milner Centre for Evolution at the University of Bath
