= The Last Days of Smallpox =

2018 book by Mark Pallen

The Last Days of Smallpox: Tragedy in Birmingham
- Cover
- Author: Mark Pallen
- Language: English
- Subject: 1978 smallpox outbreak in the United Kingdom
- Publisher: Amazon
- Publication date: April 2018
- Publication place: United Kingdom
- Media type: Print (Paperback)
- Pages: 325
- ISBN: 9781980455226

The Last Days of Smallpox: Tragedy in Birmingham is a 2018 nonfiction account of the events leading up to and following the 1978 smallpox outbreak in the United Kingdom. The author, Mark Pallen, proposes an explanation of how Janet Parker – the last person to die from smallpox – contracted the infection. This explanation, based on court transcripts and interviews with the barrister who defended the University, and the clinicians and scientists who were involved with the outbreak, contradicts the conclusions of the official government enquiry, The Shooter Report.

In the autumn of 1978, Parker, a photographer employed by the University of Birmingham and based at its medical school, contracted smallpox and died from the infection. The strain of smallpox that killed her was being analysed in a laboratory below the second floor rooms where Parker worked. In his report, Shooter concluded that the virus had travelled up a service duct. Shooter's conclusion was contested in the legal case – Robert Kenyon Cook versus the University of Birmingham – by an expert witness, Professor Kevin McCarthy, who considered the "duct" hypothesis impossible given the small amounts of virus that were present in the laboratory. The magistrates found the university not guilty of charges made by the Health and Safety Executive, which left the question of how Parker had contracted the infection unanswered, although there was no doubt that the same strain of smallpox virus had been used in experiments in the laboratory.

Nearly forty years later, in his book Pallen conjectures that if the virus did not "go" to Parker, she must have "gone" to the virus. It is possible that Parker gained unauthorised access to the Smallpox Laboratory, when offering staff photographic film at a discounted price or when seeking advice on photographic materials used in the laboratory experiments.

A.M. Walker, reviewing the book for the Journal of Hospital Infection, notes that it is detailed and scholarly while being written for a lay audience. The first three of seven sections in the book provide the reader with historical background on the smallpox disease and its eradication. Walker describes the book as a "gripping story" and praises the author's "journalistic flair". Philip Mortimer, reviewing in the journal Epidemiology and Infection, describes Pallen's "interesting tale" as a "warning to scientists" that is accessible to the general reader and relevant to professionals. He notes that the book also describes two earlier laboratory escapes.
