= Emerging Infectious Diseases =

Peer-reviewed scientific journal

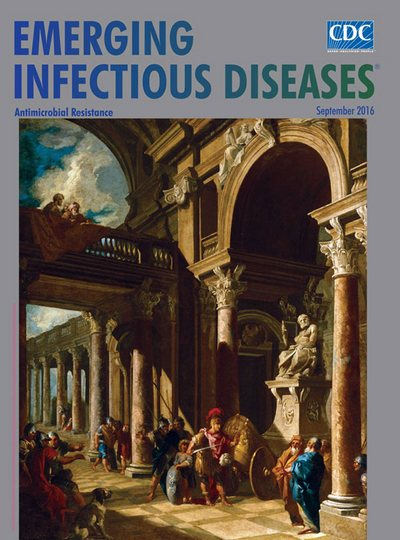
- Discipline: Infectious diseases
- Language: English

Publication details
- History: 1995–present
- Publisher: Centers for Disease Control and Prevention (United States)
- Frequency: Monthly
- Open access: Yes
- License: Public domain
- Impact factor: 7.2 (2023)

Standard abbreviations
- ISO 4: Emerg. Infect. Dis.

Indexing
- CODEN: EIDIFA
- ISSN: 1080-6040 (print); 1080-6059 (web)
- LCCN: sn95007041
- OCLC no.: 31848353

Links
- Journal homepage; Online access; Online archive

Emerging Infectious Diseases is a monthly open-access peer-reviewed medical journal published by the Centers for Disease Control and Prevention. The journal is in the public domain and covers global instances of new and reemerging infectious diseases, putting greater emphasis on disease emergence, prevention, control, and elimination. According to the Journal Citation Reports, the journal has a 2023 impact factor of 7.2.

== Abstracting and indexing ==
The journal is abstracted and indexed in Index Medicus/MEDLINE/PubMed, Science Citation Index Expanded, and Scopus.
