= Solihull Hospital =

- University Hospitals Birmingham NHS Foundation Trust
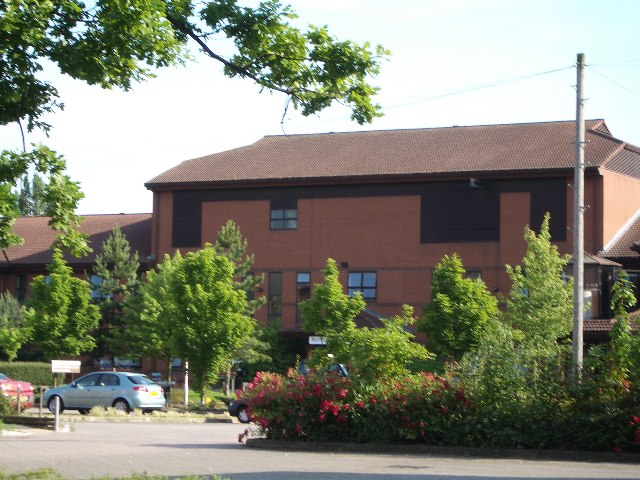
- Solihull Hospital

Geography
- Location: Solihull, West Midlands, England
- Coordinates: 52.4183°N 1.7737°W

Organisation
- Care system: NHS
- Type: District General

History
- Founded: 1898

Links
- Website: www.uhb.nhs.uk
- Lists: Hospitals in England

Solihull Hospital is a general hospital in Solihull, West Midlands, England. It is managed by University Hospitals Birmingham NHS Foundation Trust.

== History ==
The hospital has its origins in the Solihull Union Workhouse Infirmary which was completed in 1898. The hospital joined the National Health Service as Solihull Hospital in 1948.

A new purpose-built hospital was built at a cost of £38 million in the early 1990s and the new facilities were officially opened in June 1994. A new dermatology unit was opened in December 2015 and a new haematology and oncology day unit was opened in May 2018.

In December 2021 the NHS decided to set up Nightingale Surge Hubs around the country in response to the COVID-19 Omicron variant. One of the temporary hubs was on the staff car park at Solihull Hospital with a capacity of approximately 100 beds. The surge hub was decommissioned without treating a single patient.

The construction of the Solihull Elective Surgery Hub consisting of six theatres (three ultra-clean and three robotic) started in early 2023 and built in modular format. One of the first patients to be treated in the new theatres was in November 2024. The new theatre hub cost £46m.

== Notable staff ==
- Geoffrey Gillam FRCP (1905–1970) was a consultant cardiologist at the hospital in the 1960s.
