= Journal of Antimicrobial Chemotherapy =

- Discipline: Microbiology, pharmacology
- Language: English
- Edited by: J. Peter Donnelly

Publication details
- History: 1975–present
- Publisher: Oxford University Press
- Frequency: Monthly
- Open access: Hybrid and delayed (after 12 months)
- Impact factor: 3.9 (2023)

Standard abbreviations
- ISO 4: J. Antimicrob. Chemother.

Indexing
- CODEN: JACHDX
- ISSN: 0305-7453 (print); 1460-2091 (web)
- OCLC no.: 612059247

Links
- Journal homepage; Online access; Online archive

The Journal of Antimicrobial Chemotherapy is a peer-reviewed medical journal which covers antimicrobial chemotherapy, including laboratory aspects and clinical use of antimicrobial agents. It is published by Oxford University Press on behalf of the British Society for Antimicrobial Chemotherapy and was established in 1975. In January 2015 J. Peter Donnelly (Radboud University Nijmegen Medical Centre) became the eighth editor-in-chief replacing Alan P. Johnson (Health Protection Agency, London, United Kingdom). The journal has had two previous publishers. All content is available for free after 12 months while authors also have the option to have their articles published immediately as open access.

== History ==
The Journal of Antimicrobial Chemotherapy was founded by David Williams in 1975, who was also its editor for its first six years.

== Abstracting and indexing ==
The journal is abstracted and indexed in:

- Academic Search
- Biological Abstracts
- BIOSIS Previews
- CAB Abstracts
- Chemical Abstracts
- CINAHL Plus
- Current Contents/Clinical Medicine
- Current Contents/Life Sciences
- Elsevier BIOBASE
- Embase
- Global Health
- Index Medicus/MEDLINE/PubMed
- Science Citation Index
- Scopus
- Tropical Diseases Bulletin

According to the Journal Citation Reports, the journal has a 2023 impact factor of 3.9.
