= Heartlands Hospital =

- University Hospitals Birmingham NHS Foundation Trust
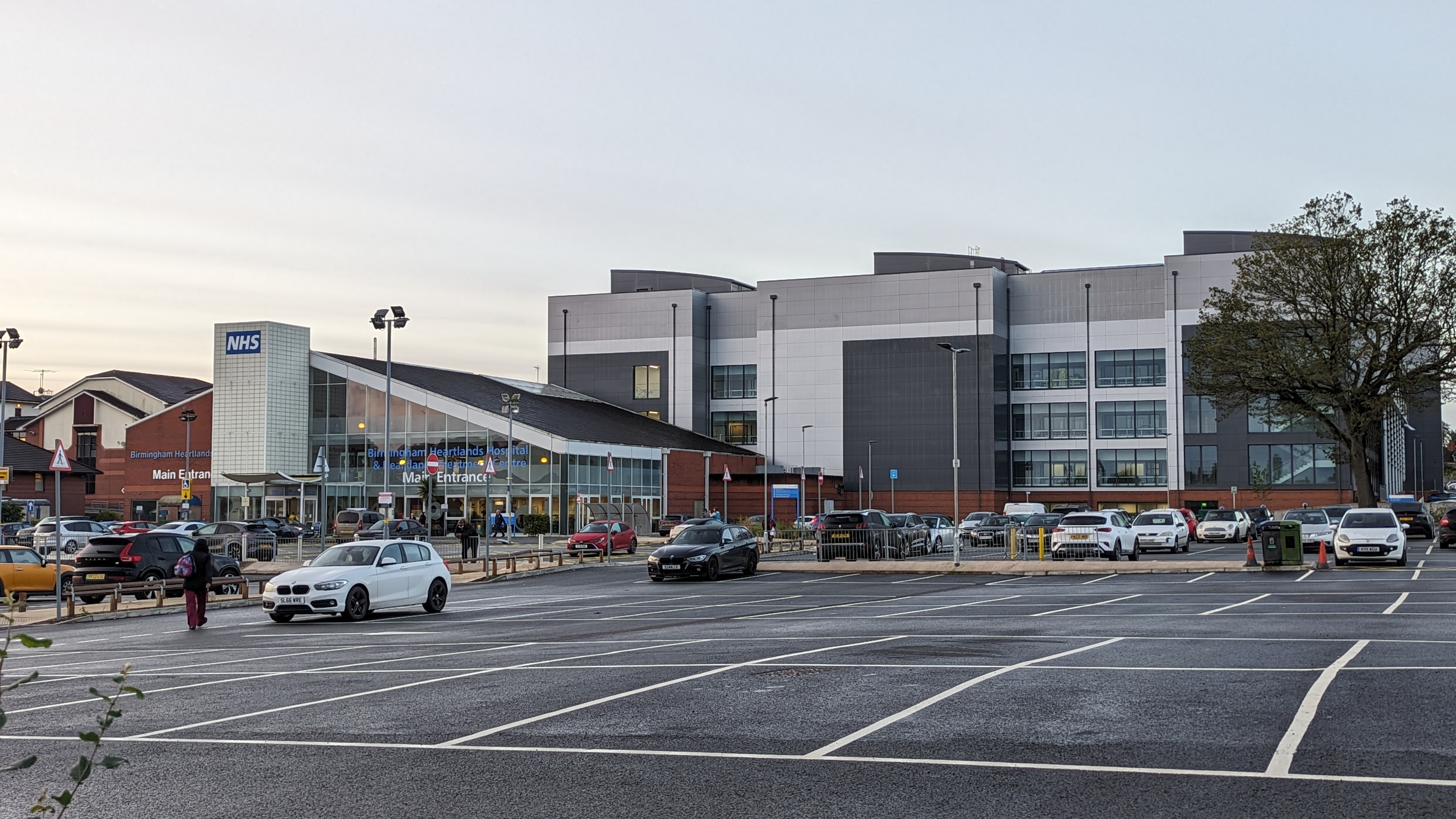
- Heartlands Hospital and the Heartlands Treatment Centre

- Location within West Midlands

Geography
- Location: Bordesley Green, Birmingham, West Midlands, England
- Coordinates: 52.4788°N 1.8295°W

Organisation
- Care system: NHS
- Type: District General

Services
- Emergency department: Yes

History
- Founded: 1895

Links
- Website: www.uhb.nhs.uk
- Lists: Hospitals in England

Heartlands Hospital, formerly East Birmingham District Hospital, is an acute general hospital in Bordesley Green, Birmingham, England. It is managed by University Hospitals Birmingham NHS Foundation Trust.

== History ==
The hospital has its origins in an infectious diseases hospital known as City Hospital, Little Bromwich which was completed in June 1895. Intended for activation only at times of medical emergency, it was tasked with responding to a typhoid fever outbreak in 1901. Three additional pavilions and a nurses' home were added in 1904. It treated patients with scarlet fever, measles, diphtheria and tuberculosis during the First World War.

After joining the National Health Service as Little Bromwich Hospital in 1948, it became a general hospital in 1953. It was renamed East Birmingham Hospital in 1963 and saw considerable expansion in the 1970s. The world's last smallpox patient, Janet Parker, was treated at the hospital during the smallpox outbreak in 1978. It became Heartlands Hospital in 1993.

== Development ==
The hospital's outpatient facilities were greatly expanded through the opening of the Heartlands Treatment Centre, an 18,000 sq metre four-storey building containing 120 consultation rooms, 26 specialist audiology and ear nose and throat rooms, ultrasound and X-ray rooms, and CT scan and MRI scanning facilities. The facility was handed over to the NHS trust in November 2022, and opened to patients in January 2023.

== Integration ==
In 2024 it began to develop integrated neighbourhood teams, which cover a population of between 30,000 and 50,000. They are focused on the patients who make the greatest demands on both the NHS and social care. The 250 people who account for most visits to the Heartlands’ accident and emergency department are tracked in real time and when they appear at the hospital the neighbourhood team will work out if their needs can be met elsewhere. This has reduced the number of contacts with GPs by about 30% and the number of “occupied bed days” at the hospital by 14%.
