= The Ghost Map =

2006 book by Steven Johnson

- Author: Steven Berlin Johnson
- Language: English
- Publisher: Riverhead
- Publication date: October 19, 2006
- ISBN: 1594489254

The Ghost Map: The Story of London's Most Terrifying Epidemic – and How it Changed Science, Cities and the Modern World is a book by Steven Berlin Johnson in which he describes the most intense outbreak of cholera in Victorian London and centers on John Snow and Henry Whitehead.

It was released on 19 October 2006 through Riverhead.

== Synopsis ==
The work covers the 1854 Broad Street cholera outbreak. The two central figures are physician John Snow, who created a map of the cholera cases, and the Reverend Henry Whitehead, whose extensive knowledge of the local community helped determine the initial cause of the outbreak. John Snow was a revered anesthetist who carried out epidemiological work in Soho, London. Around the mid-1850s Snow figured out the source of cholera contamination to be the drinking water from the Broad Street pump.

== Reception ==
The New York Times reviewed The Ghost Map, stating that there was "a great story here". A review posted in the International Journal of Epidemiology was largely favorable, stating that "the single weakness of this book is a bewildering final section which attempts to apply John Snow's work to a long list of contemporary problems. But for the reader prepared to put the book down at page 217, Steven Johnson has written a comprehensive, diversely sourced and insightful blockbuster account of a cholera outbreak in Victorian London."

Reviews

- Quammen, David (12 November 2006). "The Ghost Map By Steven Johnson - Books - Review". The New York Times. ISSN 0362-4331.
- Prusak, Larry (22 March 2007). "The Ghost Map by Steven Johnson". Harvard Business Review. ISSN 0017-8012.
- Epstein, Helen (June 28, 2007). "Death by the numbers". The New York Review of Books. 54 (11): 41–44. PMID 17595728.
- Metcalfe, Chris (1 August 2007). "The Ghost Map. Steven Johnson". International Journal of Epidemiology. 36 (4): 935–936. doi:10.1093/ije/dym111. ISSN 0300-5771.

== See also ==
- Epidemiology
- Germ theory
- Miasma theory
