= Sidhanwali =

Pakistani village

Coordinates: 31°48′00″N 74°29′11″E

Sidhanwali is a village in the Sheikhupura District of Punjab, Pakistan. The village of Sidhanwali is at the point where the Marala–Ravi Link Canal and the Bambanwala–Ravi–Bedian (BRB) Link Canal discharge into the Ravi River.

== History ==
After the third cholera pandemic - the first case of cholera in British India's Sialkot District took place in the village on 14 August 1876. Sialkot's patient zero had returned from Lahore on 13 August - the city of Lahore had a few cases of the disease at that time. On 14 May 1948, after an agreement with India, Pakistan built a canal in the Chenab River near to the village of Sidhanwali.
