= Helen Epstein (journalist) =

American professor and journalist (born 1961)

Helen C. Epstein (born 1961) is an American professor of human rights and public health, with a special interest in Uganda and other East African nations. She has researched reproductive health and AIDS in Africa for organizations such as the Rockefeller Foundation, Population Council, and Human Rights Watch. In 2003-2004, she won a John Simon Guggenheim Memorial Fellowship. The next year, she was a visiting research scholar at Princeton University's Center for Health and Wellbeing.

Epstein is the author of two books, and has been a frequent contributor to The New York Review of Books. Her articles have also appeared in The New York Times Magazine, The Washington Post, The Times Literary Supplement, The Lancet, Granta Magazine, and many other publications.

== Biography ==
Epstein received her BA degree in 1984 (Physics, University of California-Berkeley), her Ph.D. in 1991 (Molecular Biology, Cambridge University), and her MSc in 1996 (Public Health in Developing Countries, London School of Hygiene and Tropical Medicine). In 1993, she moved to Uganda to search for an AIDS vaccine on behalf of Chiron Corporation and Case Western Reserve University. While there, she taught molecular biology in the medical school at Makerere University in Kampala.

Although her efforts to find a vaccine failed, Epstein was able to witness firsthand the suffering caused by HIV, which became the subject of her 2007 book, The Invisible Cure: Africa, the West, and the Fight Against AIDS (note: when it was reissued in paperback by Picador in 2008, the subtitle was changed to Why We Are Losing the Fight Against AIDS in Africa). The book is an autobiographical account of her 15 years spent studying the AIDS epidemic and the reactions to it of Western scientists, humanitarian agencies, and the communities most affected by AIDS deaths. She argues that the African countries hardest hit by HIV are not those whose citizens are "promiscuous", but rather where it is common for people to have "long-term concurrent" sexual relationships, in which an individual might have more than one long-term partner at a time, and when some partners might overlap for months or years. She notes how this giant web of ongoing sexual relationships "creates ideal conditions for the spread of HIV; if one person in the network contracts HIV, everyone else is put at risk." The Invisible Cure made The New York Times list of 100 Notable Books from 2007.

After The Invisible Cure, Epstein continued to research political, health and humanitarian issues in Uganda and elsewhere in East Africa. Her reporting from the continent was regularly featured in The New York Times and The New York Review of Books. Her increasing focus on African politics led to her writing the 2017 book, Another Fine Mess: America, Uganda, and the War on Terror. In this work, she criticizes U.S. foreign policy for unconditionally backing Ugandan dictator Yoweri Museveni, which she believes contributed to the region's political turmoil and widespread suffering.

Since 2010, Epstein has been Visiting Professor of Human Rights and Global Public Health in the Global and International Studies Program at Bard College. In 2013-2014, she was an Open Society Fellow with Open Society Foundations.

== Bibliography ==
=== Books ===
- The Invisible Cure: Africa, the West, and the Fight Against AIDS. Farrar, Straus and Giroux. 2007. ISBN 978-0374281526.
- Another Fine Mess: America, Uganda, and the War on Terror. Columbia Global Reports. 2017. ISBN 978-0997722925.

=== Selected book reviews ===
Year	Review article	Work(s) reviewed
2007	"Death by the Numbers". The New York Review of Books. June 28, 2007.	Johnson, Steven (2006). The Ghost Map: The Story of London's Most Terrifying Epidemic—and How It Changed Science, Cities, and the Modern World.
2007	"Getting Away With Murder". The New York Review of Books. July 19, 2007.	Brandt, Allan M. (2007). The Cigarette Century: The Rise, Fall and Deadly Persistence of the Product That Defined America.
2015	"The Strange Politics of Saving the Children". The New York Review of Books. November 5, 2015.	Fifield, Adam (2015). A Mighty Purpose: How Jim Grant Sold the World on Saving Its Children.
2020	"Left Behind". The New York Review of Books. March 26, 2020.	Case, Anne; Deaton, Angus (2020). Deaths of Despair and the Future of Capitalism. Silva, Jennifer M. (2019). We're Still Here: Pain and Politics in the Heart of America.
2021	"The Roots of Rwanda's Genocide". The New York Review of Books. June 10, 2021. Co-authored with Claude Gatebuke.	Wong, Michela (2021). Do Not Disturb: The Story of a Political Murder and an African Regime Gone Bad.

=== Selected articles ===
- Epstein, Helen (May 18, 2001). "The Plagues of Transition". Project Syndicate.
- Epstein, Helen (June 13, 2004). "The Fidelity Fix". The New York Times. Archived from the original on May 22, 2023.
- Epstein, Helen (August 8, 2007). "There is no room for sexual morality in an honest conversation about Aids". The Guardian.
- Epstein, Helen (May 12, 2011). "Flu Warning: Beware the Drug Companies!". The New York Review of Books.
- Epstein, Helen (August 1, 2014). "Africa's Slide Toward Disaster". The New York Times.
- Epstein, Helen (May 16, 2016). "The Cost of Fake Democracy". The New York Review of Books.
