= 1854 Broad Street cholera outbreak =

Severe outbreak of cholera that occurred in London in 1854

- Part of the 1846–1860 cholera pandemic
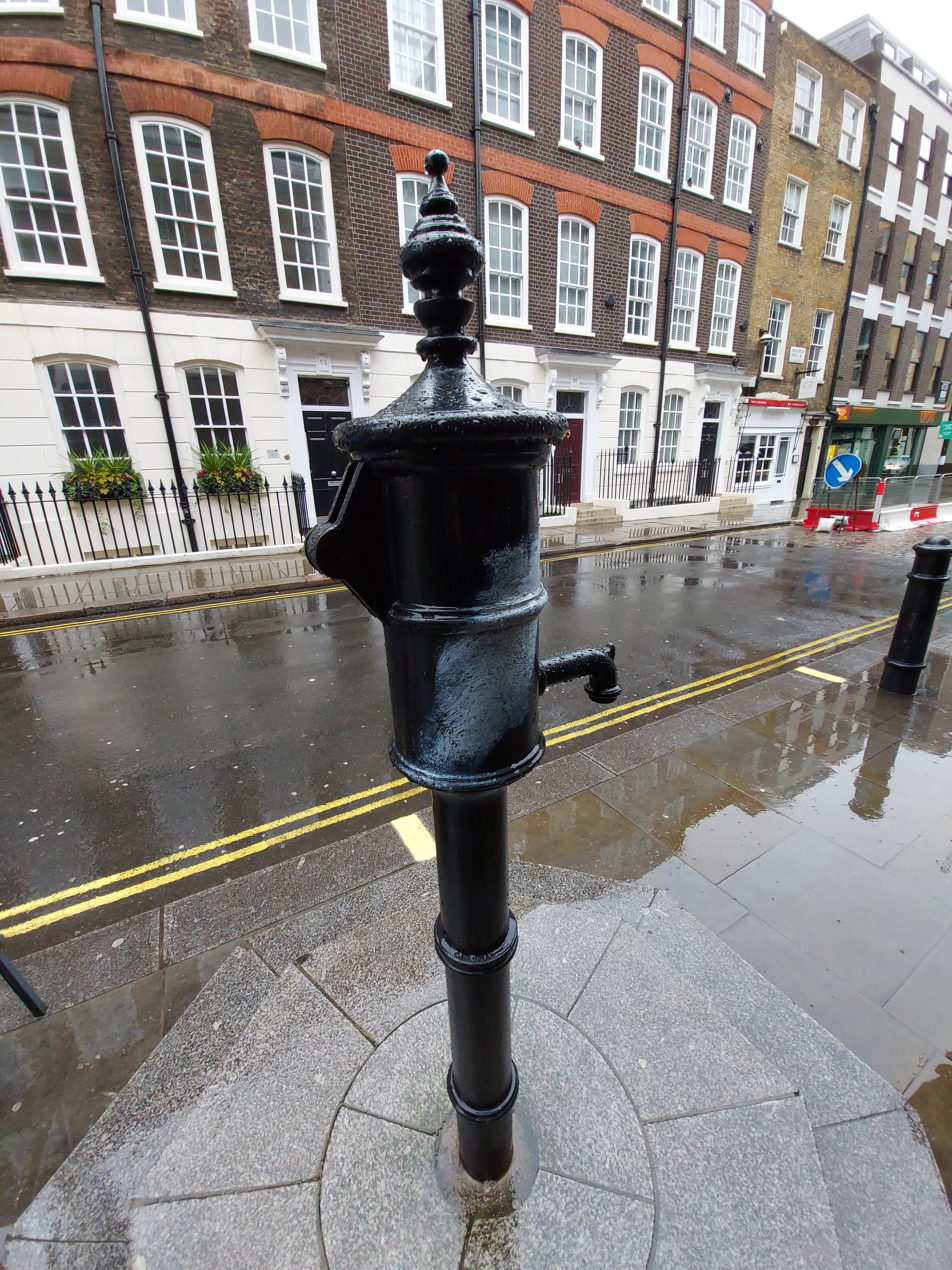
- A replica pump commemorating the outbreak and John Snow's investigation of it
- Date: 1854
- Location: Soho, London, UK; 51°30′48″N 00°08′12″W
- Cause: Vibrio cholerae present within the pumping water due to contamination by sewage
- Deaths: 420

A severe outbreak of cholera occurred in 1854 near Broad Street (now Broadwick Street) and Golden Square in Soho, London, England, during the worldwide 1846–1860 cholera pandemic. The outbreak (also known as Golden Square outbreak), which killed 420 people, is best known for the physician John Snow's study of its causes and his hypothesis that germ-contaminated water was the cause, rather than something in the air called "miasma". This discovery influenced public health and the construction of improved sanitation facilities beginning in the mid-19th century. Later, the term "focus of infection" was used to describe sites, such as the Broad Street pump, where conditions are favourable for transmission of infection. Snow unknowingly took advantage of a natural experiment during his endeavours to identify the cause of cholera transmission.

== Background ==
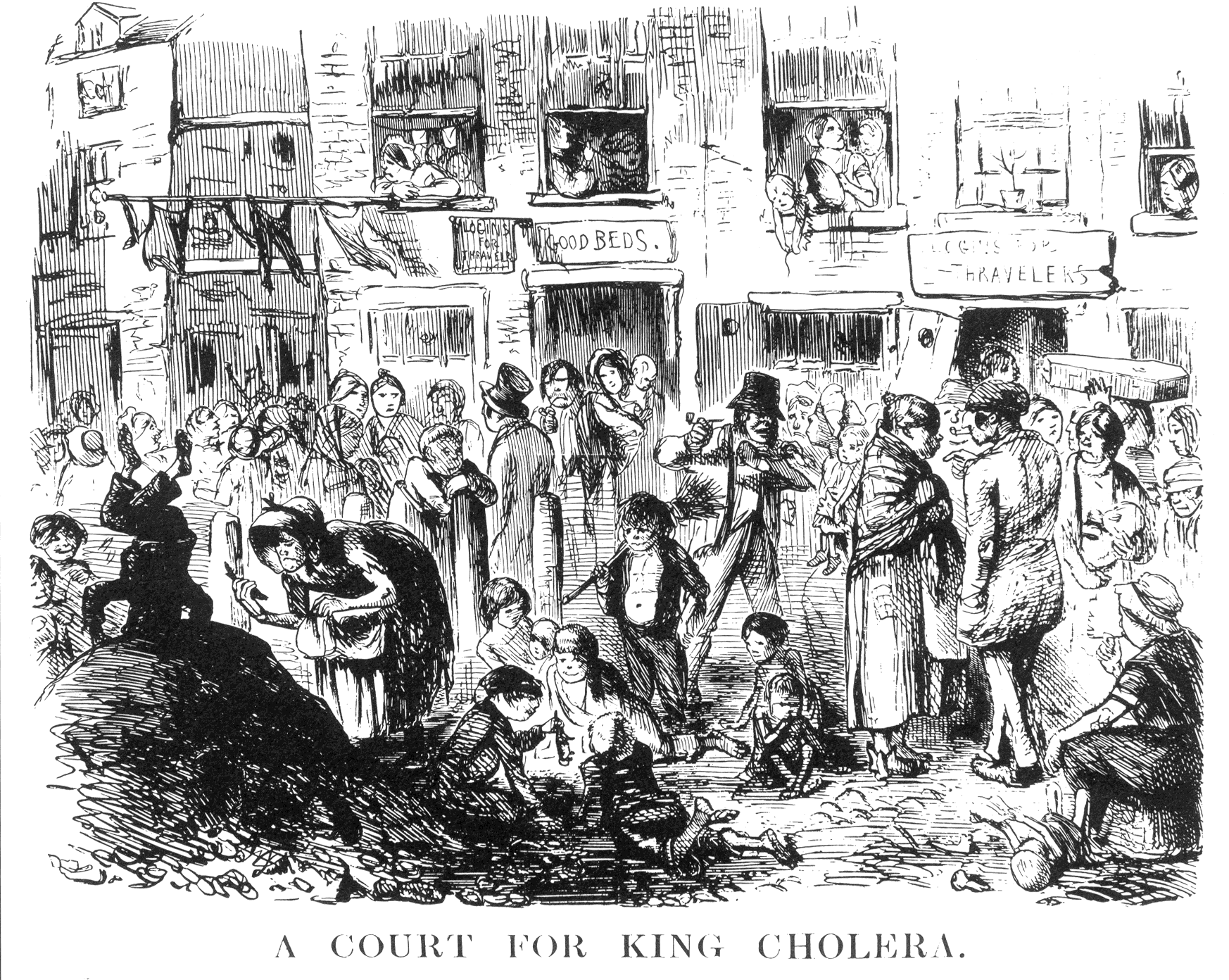
A Court for King Cholera. Illustration from Punch (1852).

In the mid-19th century, Soho in London had a serious problem with filth due to a large influx of people and lack of proper sanitary services: the London sewer system had not reached Soho. Cowsheds, slaughterhouses and grease-boiling dens lined the streets and contributed animal droppings, rotting fluids and other contaminants to Soho's primitive sewer system. Many cellars had cesspools beneath their floorboards, which formed from the sewers and filth seeping in from outside. With the cesspools overrunning, London's government decided to dump the waste into the River Thames, contaminating the water supply. London had already had a "series of debilitating cholera outbreaks". These included outbreaks in 1832 and 1849, which killed 14,137 people.

== Competing theories of cholera ==
At the time of the Broad Street outbreak, physicians and scientists held two competing theories on the causes of cholera in the human body: miasma theory and germ theory. The London medical community debated the cause of the city's persistent cholera outbreaks. The cholera-causing bacterium Vibrio cholerae was isolated in 1854, but the finding became well known and accepted only decades later.

=== Miasma theory ===
Miasma theorists concluded that cholera was caused by particles in the air, or "miasmata", which arose from decomposing matter or other dirty organic sources. "Miasma" particles were thought to travel through the air and infect individuals, and thus cause cholera. Dr William Farr, the commissioner for the 1851 London census and a member of the General Register's Office, believed that miasma arose from the soil surrounding the River Thames. It contained decaying organic matter which contained miasmatic particles and was released into the London air. Miasma theorists believed in "cleansing and scouring, rather than through the purer scientific approach of microbiology". Farr later agreed with Snow's germ theory following Snow's publications.

=== Germ theory ===
In contrast, the germ theory held that the principal cause of cholera was a germ cell that had not yet been identified. Snow theorised that this unknown germ was transmitted from person to person by individuals ingesting water. John Simon, a pathologist and London's lead medical officer, called Snow's germ theory "peculiar".

Excerpt from John Simon:

This doctrine is, that cholera propagates itself by a 'morbid matter' which, passing from one patient in his evacuations, is accidentally swallowed by other persons as a pollution of food or water; that an increase of the swallowed germ of the disease takes place in the interior of the stomach and bowels, giving rise to the essential actions of cholera, as at first a local derangement; and that 'the morbid matter of cholera having the property of reproducing its own kind must necessarily have some sort of structure, most likely that of a cell.

Even though Simon understood Snow's theory, he questioned its relation to the cause of cholera.

== Broad Street outbreak ==
On 31 August 1854, after several other outbreaks elsewhere in the city, there was a major outbreak of cholera in Soho. Snow later called it "the most terrible outbreak of cholera which ever occurred in this kingdom."

Over the next three days, 127 people on or near Broad Street died. During the next week, three quarters of the residents had fled the area. By 10 September, more than 300 people had died and the mortality rate was 12.8 per thousand inhabitants in some parts of the city. By the end of the outbreak, 420 people had died.

Many of the victims were taken to the Middlesex Hospital, where their treatment was superintended by Florence Nightingale, who briefly joined the hospital in early September in order to help with the outbreak. According to a letter by Elizabeth Gaskell, Nightingale "was up night and day from Friday afternoon (Sept. 1) to Sunday afternoon, receiving the poor creatures (chiefly fallen women of that neighbourhood - they had it the worst) who were being constantly brought in - - undressing them - putting on turpentine stupes, et cetera, doing it herself to as many as she could manage".

By talking to local residents (with the help of Reverend Henry Whitehead), Snow identified the outbreak's source as the public water pump on Broad Street (now Broadwick Street) at Cambridge Street. Although Snow's chemical and microscope examination of a sample of the water from this Broad Street pump water did not conclusively prove its danger, the patterns of illness and death among residents in Soho persuaded the St James parish authorities to disable the pump by removing its handle.

Although this action has been popularly reported as ending the outbreak, the epidemic may have already been in rapid decline, as explained by Snow:

There is no doubt that the mortality was much diminished, as I said before, by the flight of the population, which commenced soon after the outbreak; but the attacks had so far diminished before the use of the water was stopped, that it is impossible to decide whether the well still contained the cholera poison in an active state, or whether, from some cause, the water had become free from it.

Snow later used a dot map to illustrate how cases of cholera occurred around this pump. His efforts to connect the incidence of cholera with potential geographic sources was based on what is now known as a Voronoi diagram. He mapped the individual water pumps and generated cells representing all the points on his map that were closest to each pump. The section of Snow's map representing areas in the city where the closest available source of water was the Broad Street pump had the highest incidence of cholera. Snow also performed a statistical comparison between the Southwark and Vauxhall Waterworks Company and a waterworks at Seething Wells (owned by the Lambeth Waterworks Company) that was further upriver and hence had cleaner water; he showed that houses supplied by the former had a cholera mortality rate 14 times that of those supplied by the latter.

Of the decline in cases related to the Broad Street pump, Snow said:

It will be observed that the deaths either very much diminished, or ceased altogether, at every point where it becomes decidedly nearer to send to another pump than to the one in Broad street. It may also be noticed that the deaths are most numerous near to the pump where the water could be more readily obtained.

There was one significant anomaly: none of the workers in the nearby Broad Street brewery contracted cholera. As they were given a daily allowance of beer, they did not consume water from the nearby well. During the brewing process, the wort (un-fermented beer) is boiled in part so that hops can be added. This step killed the cholera bacteria in the water they used to brew with, making it safe to drink. Snow showed that the Southwark and Vauxhall Waterworks Company was taking water from sewage-polluted sections of the Thames and delivering it to homes, resulting in an increased incidence of cholera among its customers. Snow's study is part of the history of public health and health geography. It is regarded as the founding event of epidemiology.

In Snow's own words:

On proceeding to the spot, I found that nearly all the deaths had taken place within a short distance of the [Broad Street] pump. There were only ten deaths in houses situated decidedly nearer to another street-pump. In five of these cases the families of the deceased persons informed me that they always sent to the pump in Broad Street, as they preferred the water to that of the pumps which were nearer. In three other cases, the deceased were children who went to school near the pump in Broad Street ...

With regard to the deaths occurring in the locality belonging to the pump, there were 61 instances in which I was informed that the deceased persons used to drink the pump-water from Broad Street, either constantly or occasionally ...

The result of the inquiry then was, that there had been no particular outbreak or prevalence of cholera in this part of London except among the persons who were in the habit of drinking the water of the above-mentioned pump-well.

I had an interview with the Board of Guardians of St. James's parish, on the evening of Thursday, the 7th September, and represented the above circumstances to them. In consequence of what I said, the handle of the pump was removed on the following day.

It was discovered later that this public well had been dug 3 feet (0.9 m) from an old cesspit that had begun to leak faecal bacteria. Waste water from washing nappies used by a baby who had contracted cholera from another source drained into this cesspit. Its opening was under a nearby house that had been rebuilt further away after a fire and a street widening. At the time there were cesspits under most homes. Most families tried to have their raw sewage collected and dumped in the Thames to prevent their cesspit from filling faster than the sewage could decompose into the soil.

At the same time, an investigation of cholera transmission was being conducted in Deptford. Around 90 people died within a few days in that town, where the water was known to be clean, and there had been no previous outbreaks of cholera. Snow was informed that the water had recently turned impure. Before using it, residents had to let it run until the sudsy, sewer-like water turned clear. Snow, finding that the water the residents were using was no different from the usual water from their pump, determined that the outbreak must be caused by a leak in the pipes that allowed surrounding sewage and its contaminants to seep in to the water supply. This was similar to the Broad Street outbreak. The incoming water was being contaminated by the increasing levels of sewage, coupled with lack of safe plumbing.

After the cholera epidemic subsided, government officials replaced the Broad Street pump handle. They had responded only to the urgent threat posed to the population, and afterwards they rejected Snow's theory. To accept his proposal would have meant indirectly accepting the oral-faecal method of transmission of disease, which was too unpleasant for most of the public to contemplate.

== Investigation by John Snow ==
Original map by John Snow showing the clusters of cholera cases (indicated by stacked rectangles) in the London epidemic of 1854. The contaminated pump is located at the crossroads of Broad Street and Cambridge Street (now Lexington Street), running into Little Windmill Street.

The Broad Street outbreak was an effect rather than a cause of the epidemic. Snow's conclusions were not predominantly based on the Broad Street outbreak, as he noted that he hesitated to come to a conclusion based on a population that had predominantly fled the neighbourhood and redistributed itself. He feared throwing off results of the study.

From a mathematical perspective, Snow's innovation was focusing on death rates in areas served by two water companies that drew water from the Thames, rather than basing it on data from victims of the Broad Street pump (which drew water from a well). Snow's work also led to a far greater health and safety impact than the removal of the Broad Street pump handle. Deactivating the pump "hardly made a dent in the citywide cholera epidemic, which went on to claim nearly 3,000 lives".

Snow was sceptical of the prevailing miasma theory, which held that diseases such as cholera or the Black Death were caused by pollution or a noxious form of "bad air". The germ theory was not yet established (Louis Pasteur proposed it in 1861). Snow did not understand the mechanism by which disease was transmitted, but the evidence led him to believe that it was not foul air. Based on the pattern of illness among residents, he hypothesized that cholera was spread by an agent in contaminated water. He first published his theory in 1849, in an essay titled "On the Mode of Communication of Cholera". In 1855 he published a second edition, including a more elaborate investigation of the effect of the water supply in the 1854 Soho outbreak.

The cholera epidemic of 1849–1854 was also related to the water supplied by companies in London at the time. The main players were the Southwark and Vauxhall Waterworks Company and the Lambeth Waterworks Company. Both provided water to their customers drawn from the Thames, which was highly contaminated with visible and invisible products and bacteria. Dr Arthur Hill Hassall examined the filtered water and found it contained animal hair, among other foul substances. He remarked:

It will be observed, that the water of the companies of the Surrey Side of London, viz., the Southwark, Vauxhall, and Lambeth, is by far the worst of all those who take their supply from the Thames

Other companies, such as the New River Company and Chelsea Waterworks Company, were observed to have better filtered water; few deaths occurred in the neighbourhoods they supplied. They not only obtained their water from cleaner sources than the Thames, but filtered the water and treated it until there were no obvious contaminants.

As mentioned above, Snow is known for his influence on public health, which arose after his studies of the cholera epidemic. In attempting to figure out who was receiving impure water in each neighbourhood, what is now known as a double-blind experiment fell right into his lap. He describes the conditions of the situation in his essays:

In many cases a single house has a supply different from that on either side. Each company supplies both rich and poor, both large houses and small; there is no difference in the condition or occupation of the persons receiving the water of the different companies...As there is no difference whatever either in the houses or the people receiving the supply of the two Water Companies, or in any of the physical conditions with which they are surrounded, it is obvious that no experiment could have been devised which would more thoroughly test the effect of water supply on the progress of Cholera than this, which circumstances placed ready made before the observer. The experiment too, was on the grandest scale. No fewer than three hundred thousand people of both sexes, of every age and occupation, and of every rank and station, from gentlefolks down to the very poor, were divided into two groups without their choice, and, in most cases, without their knowledge; one group being supplied water containing the sewage of London, and amongst it, whatever might have come from the cholera patients, the other group having water quite free from such impurity.

Snow went on to study the water contents from each home through a test performed on each sample. In this way, it could be deduced from which supplier the home received its water. He concluded that it was indeed impure water from the big companies that allowed cholera to spread rapidly. He proved this by observing London prisons, finding that cholera ceased there only a few days after switching to cleaner water sources.

== Snow's post-outbreak evaluation ==
Snow's analysis of cholera and cholera outbreaks extended past the closure of the Broad Street pump. He concluded that cholera was transmitted through and affected the alimentary canal within the human body. Cholera did not affect either the circulatory or the nervous system and there was no "poison in the blood...in the consecutive fever...the blood became poisoned from urea getting into the circulation". According to Snow, this "urea" entered the blood through kidney failure. (Acute kidney failure is a complication of cholera.)

Therefore, the fever was caused by kidney failure, not by a poison already present in the subject's bloodstream. Popular medical practices, such as bloodletting, could not be effective in such a case. Snow also argued that cholera was not a product of Miasma. "There was nothing in the air to account for the spread of cholera". According to Snow, cholera was spread by persons ingesting a substance, not through atmospheric transmittal.

== Involvement of Henry Whitehead ==
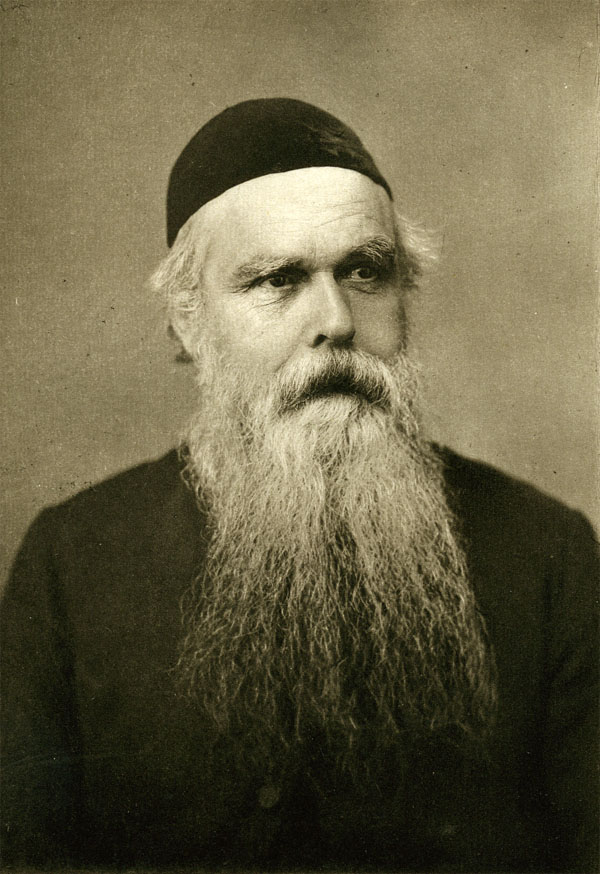
Rev. Henry Whitehead

The Reverend Henry Whitehead was an assistant curate at St. Luke's church in Soho during the 1854 cholera outbreak.

A former believer in the miasma theory of disease, Whitehead worked to disprove false theories. He was influenced by Snow's theory that cholera spreads by consumption of water contaminated by human waste. Snow's work, particularly his maps of the Soho area cholera victims, convinced Whitehead that the Broad Street pump was the source of the local infections. Whitehead joined Snow in tracking the contamination to a faulty cesspool and the outbreak's index case (the baby with cholera).

Whitehead's work with Snow combined demographic study with scientific observation, setting an important precedent for epidemiology.

== Board of Health ==
The London Board of Health, which had recently been given new powers and was presided over by Sir Benjamin Hall, a Cabinet Minister, had several committees, of which the Committee for Scientific Inquiries was placed in charge of investigating the cholera outbreak. They were to study the atmospheric environment in London and to examine samples of water from several London water companies. The committee found that the most contaminated water supply came from the South London water companies, Southwark and Vauxhall.

As part of the Committee for Scientific Inquiries, Richard Dundas Thomson and Arthur Hill Hassall examined what Thomson called "vibriones". Thomson examined the occurrence of vibriones in air samples from various cholera wards and Hassall observed vibriones in water samples. Neither identified vibriones as the cause of cholera.

As part of its investigation of the cholera epidemic, the Board of Health sent physicians to examine in detail the conditions of the Golden Square neighbourhood and its inhabitants. The Board of Health ultimately attributed the 1854 epidemic to miasma.

== Dr Edwin Lankester's evaluation ==
Dr Edwin Lankester was a physician on the local research conglomerate that studied the 1854 Broad Street cholera epidemic. In 1866, Lankester wrote about Snow's conclusion that the pump caused the outbreak. He agreed with Snow at the time, but his opinion, like Snow's, was not publicly supported. Lankester subsequently closed the pump due to Snow's theory and data on the pattern of infection, and infection rates dropped significantly. He was eventually named the first medical officer of health for St James's parish in London, the area where the pump was.

== Broadwick Street pump in the 21st century ==
A replica pump was installed in 1992 at the site of the 1854 pump. Every year the John Snow Society holds "Pumphandle Lectures" on public health subjects. Until 2015, when the pump was removed due to redevelopment, it also held a ceremony there in which it removed and reattached the pump handle to commemorate Snow's discovery. The pump's original location is marked by a red granite paver, and plaques at the John Snow pub at the corner describe Snow's findings.

== Gallery ==
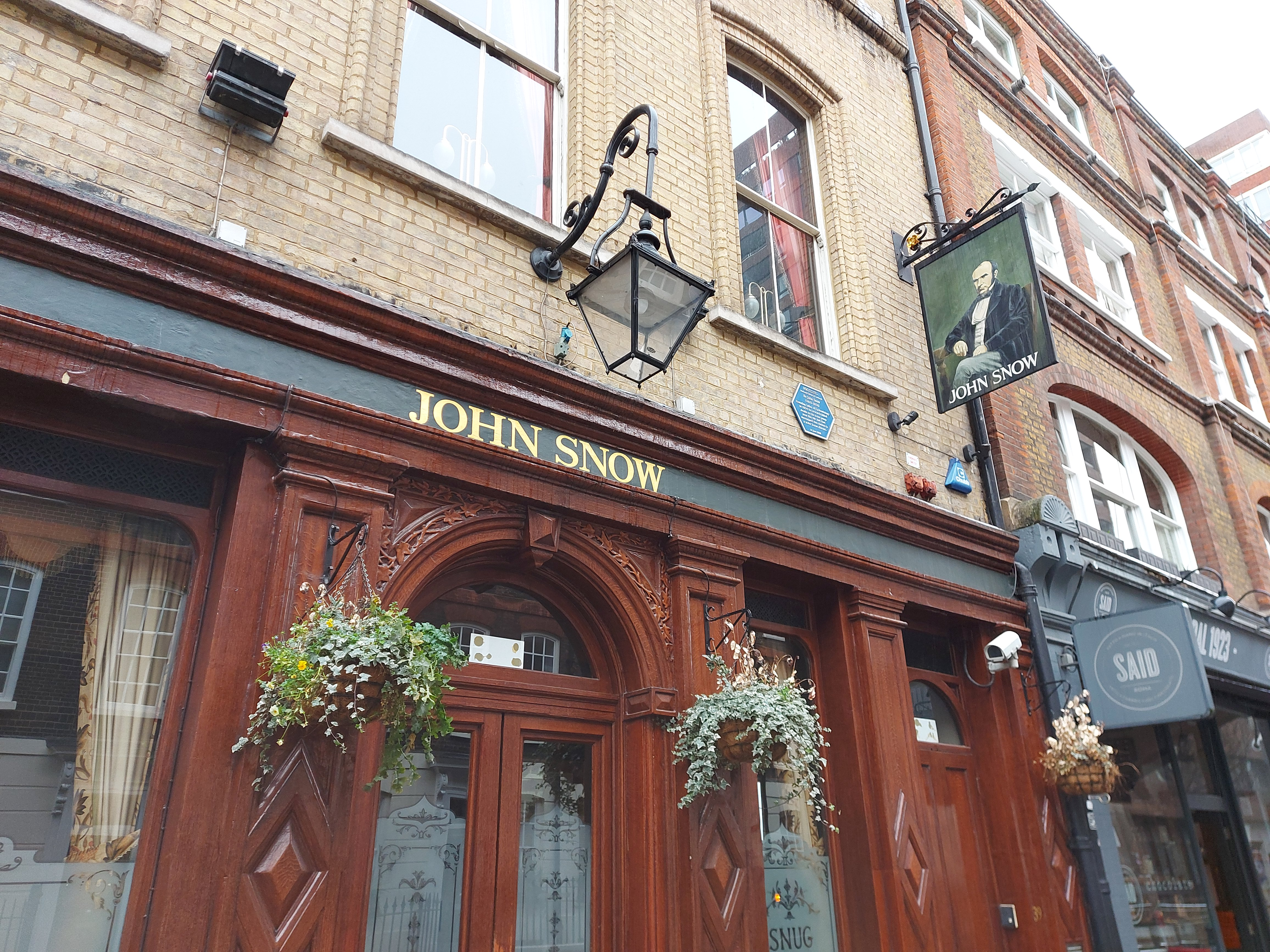
The pub, close by to the new location of the pump, named after John Snow

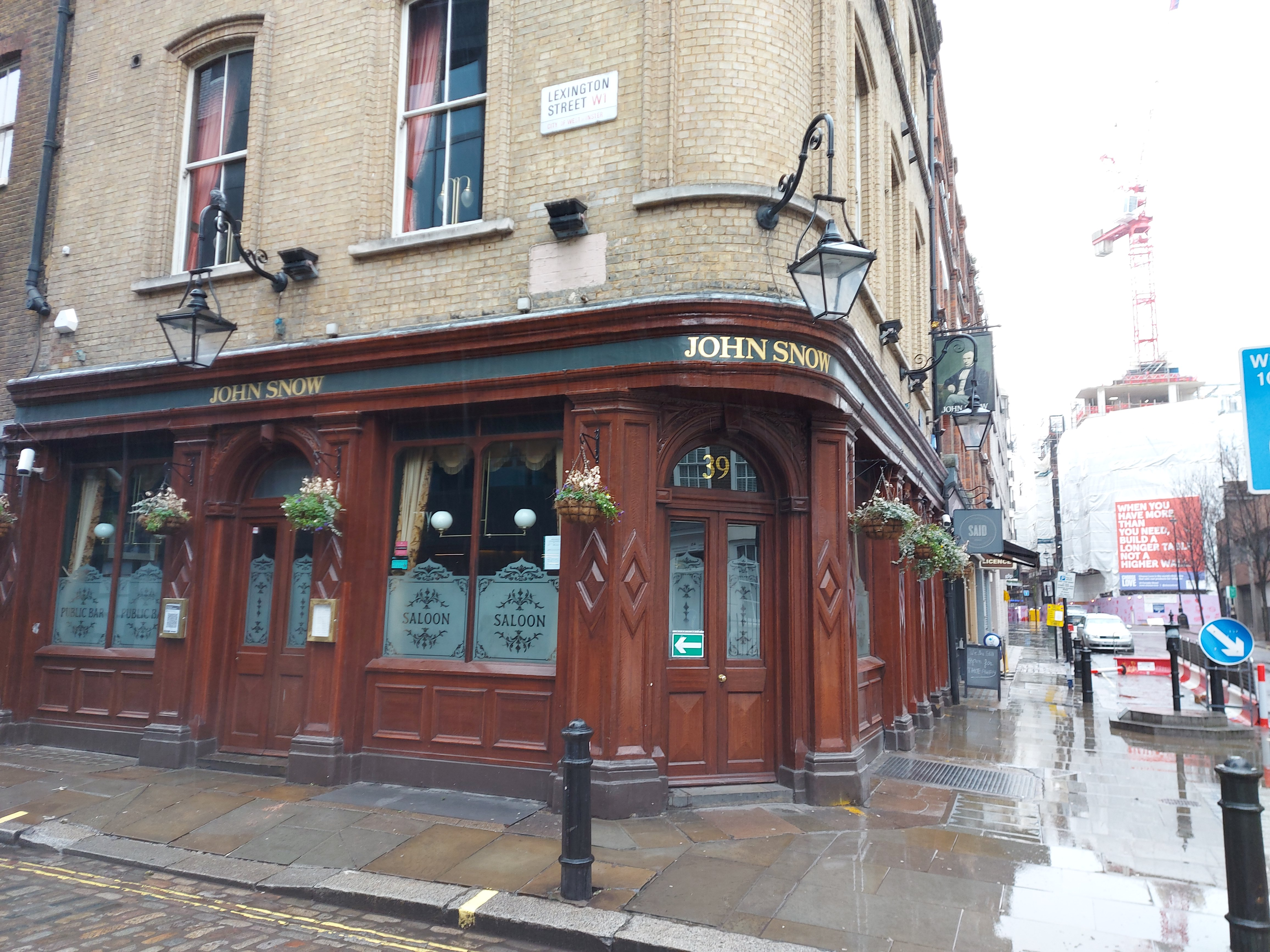
A wider image of the pub named after John Snow with the pump centre-right

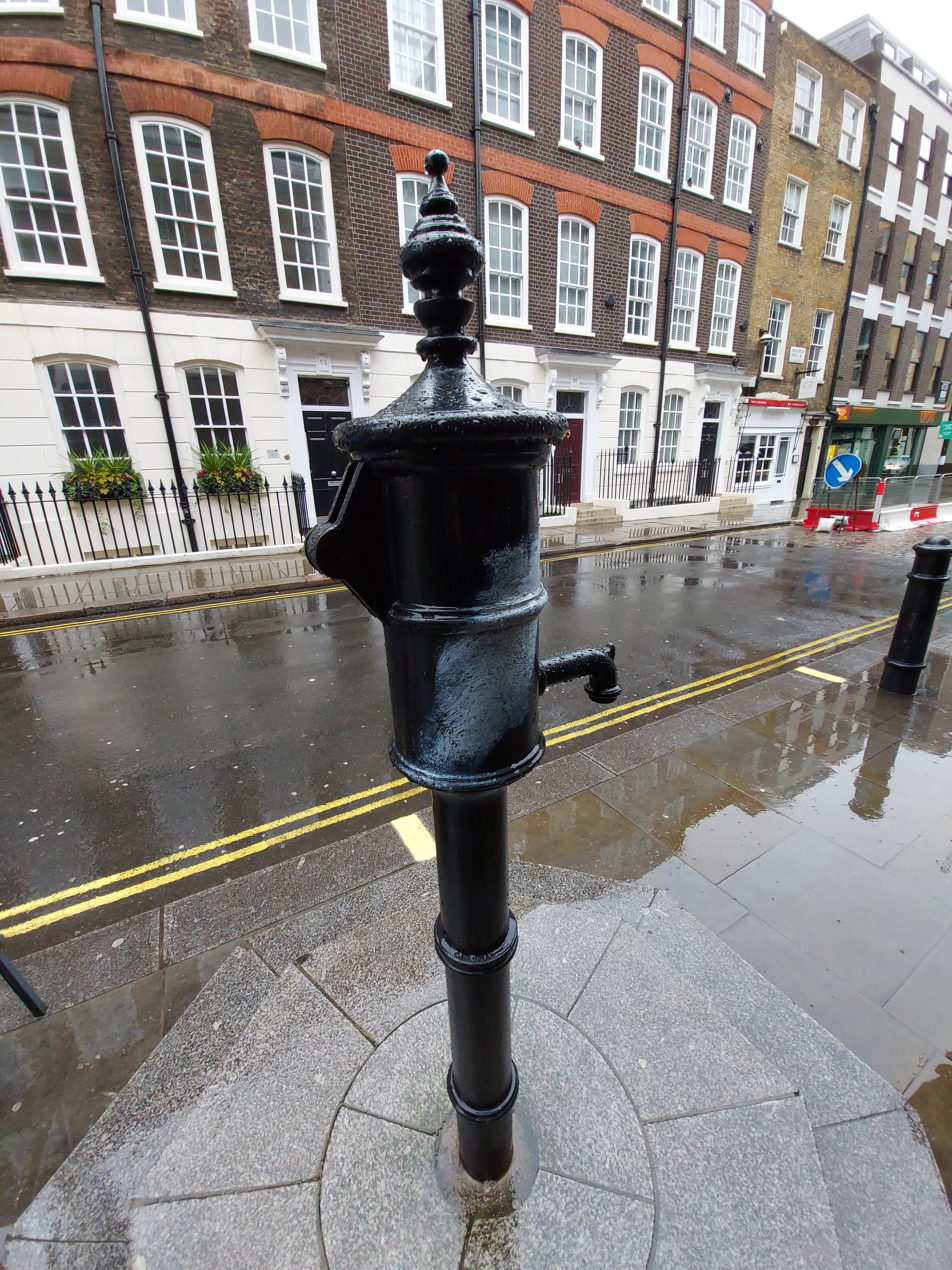
The new location of the pump whose handle John Snow removed

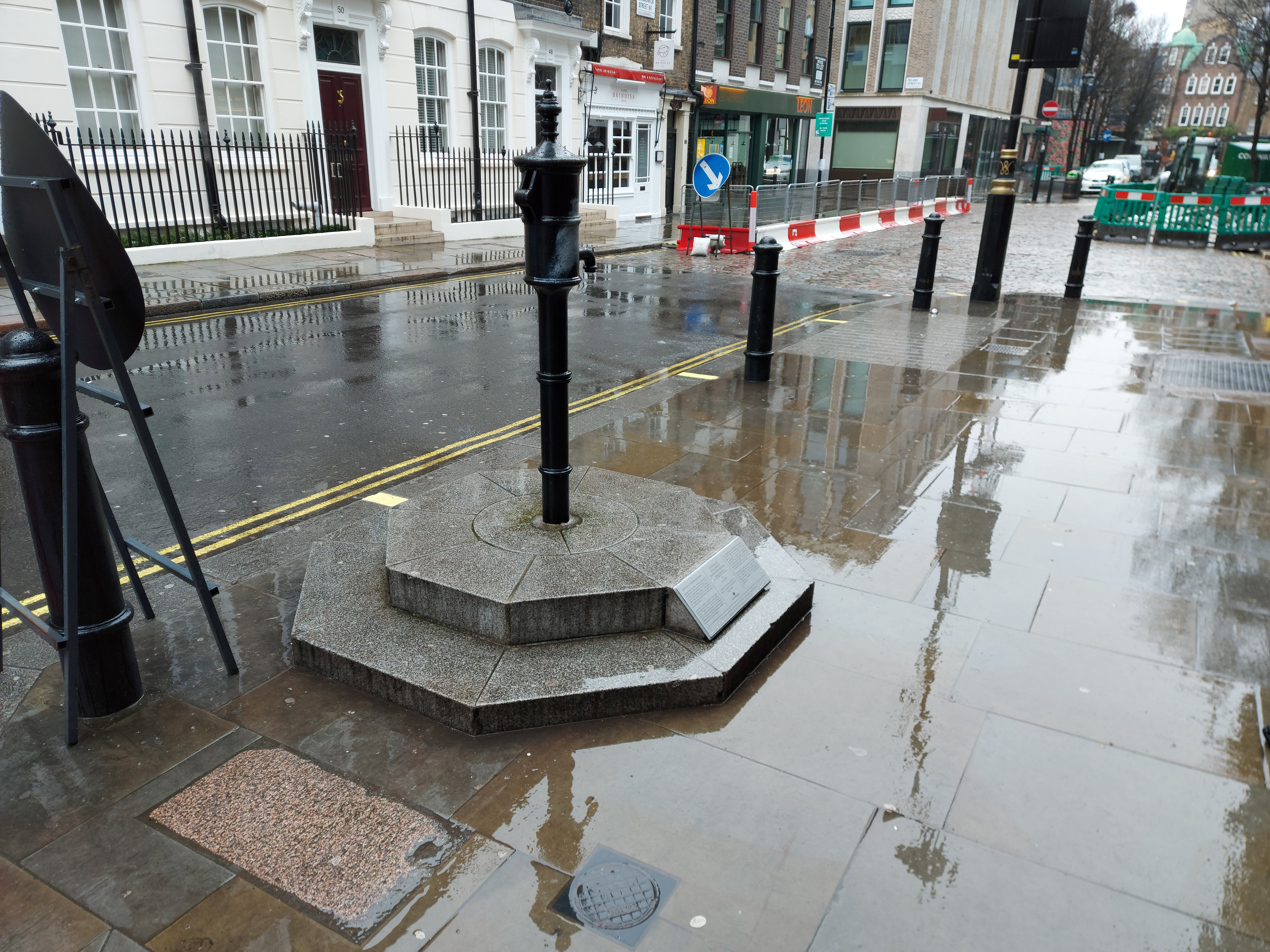
A wider image of the pump, with the red granite slab in view in the bottom-left corner

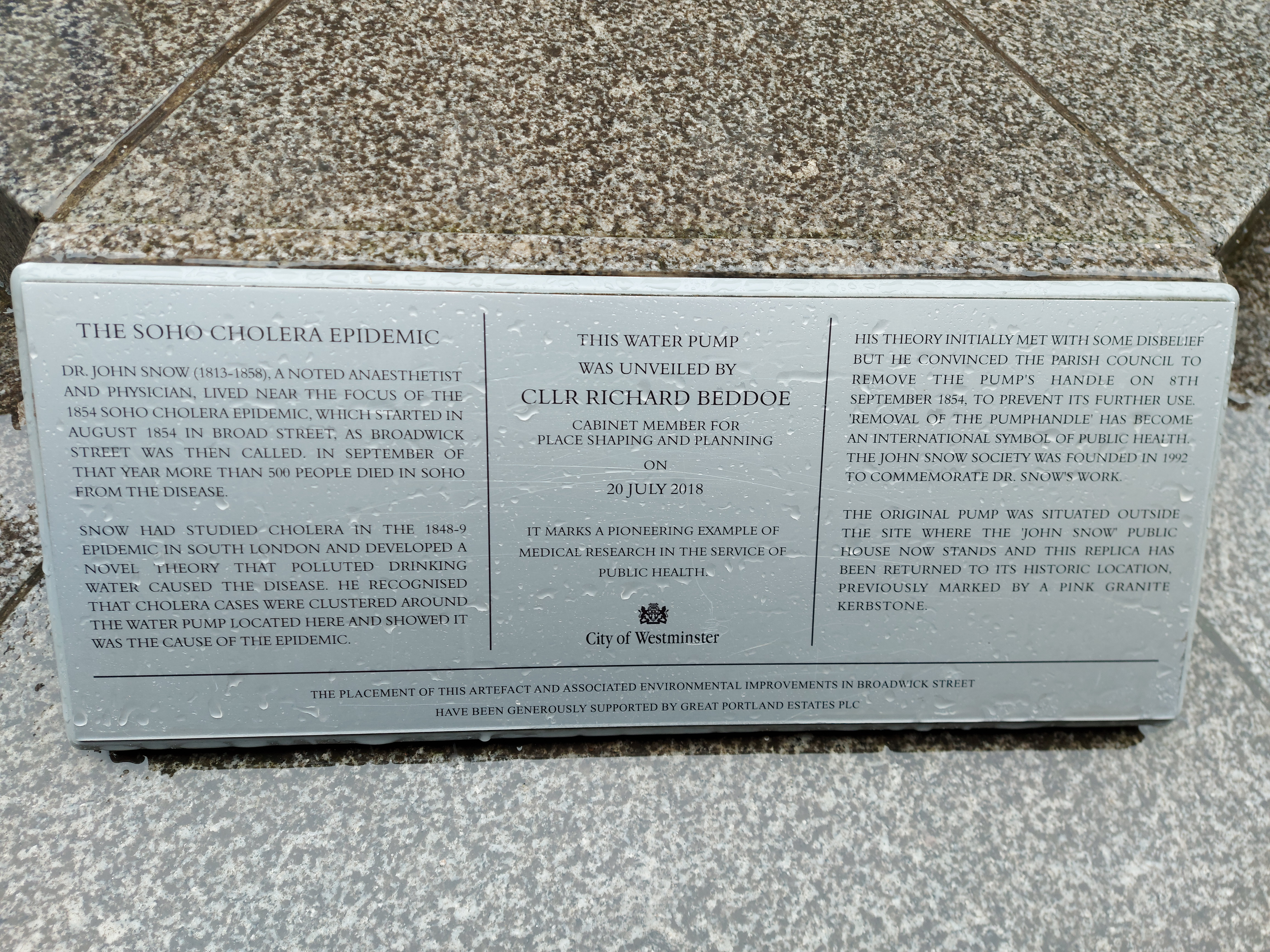
The plaque that rests on the new foundation of the pump

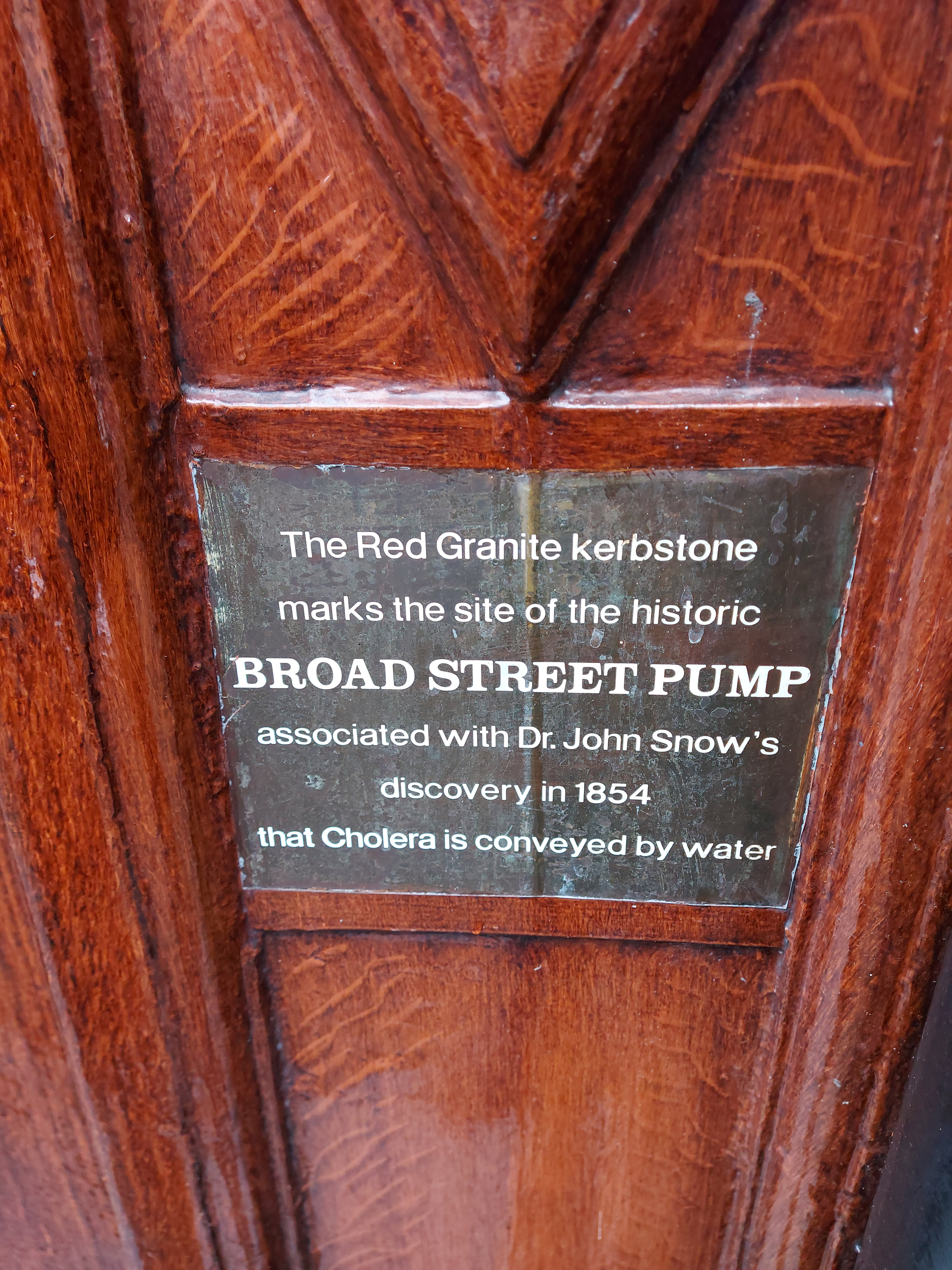
A plaque marking the significance of the red granite and the pump. Located on the wall of the John Snow pub, straight across from the pump itself.

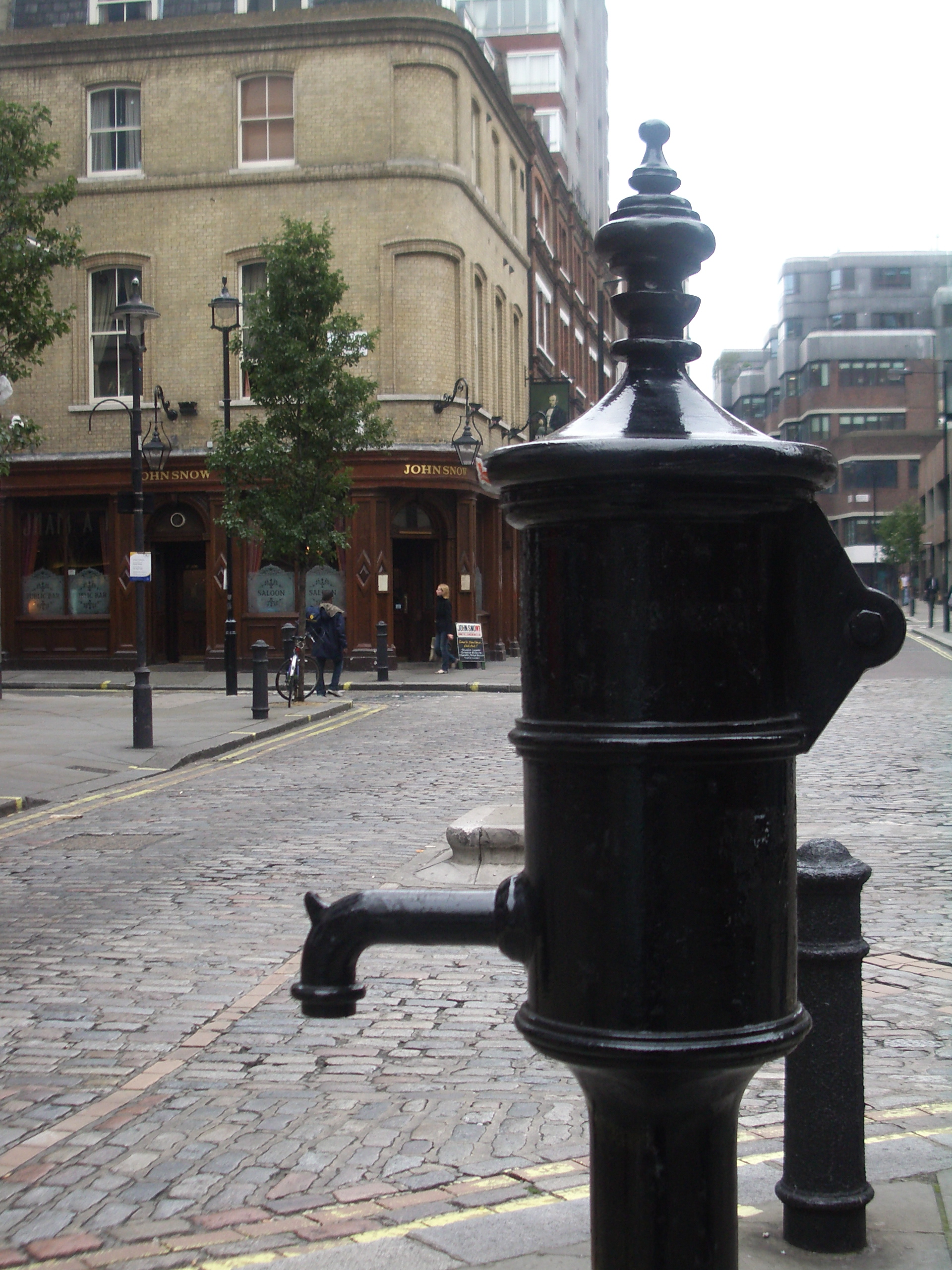
Broadwick Street showing the John Snow memorial and public house. The memorial pump was removed due to new construction in March 2016. It was replaced, on the pavement outside the pub, in 2019. A plaque affixed to the public house reads: The Red Granite kerbstone mark is the site of the historic Broad Street pump associated with Dr John Snow's discovery in 1854 that cholera is conveyed by water.

== See also ==
- Epidemiology of tuberculosis
- Filippo Pacini
- Great Stink
- Joseph Bazalgette
- The Ghost Map
- William Budd
- Diseases and epidemics of the 19th century
- History of public health in the United Kingdom

== Sources ==
- Snow, John (1855). On the Mode of Communication of Cholera (2nd ed.). London: John Churchill. See also: Mode of Communication of Cholera(John Snow, 1855)
