= Henry Whitehead (priest) =

English epidemiologist (1825–1896)

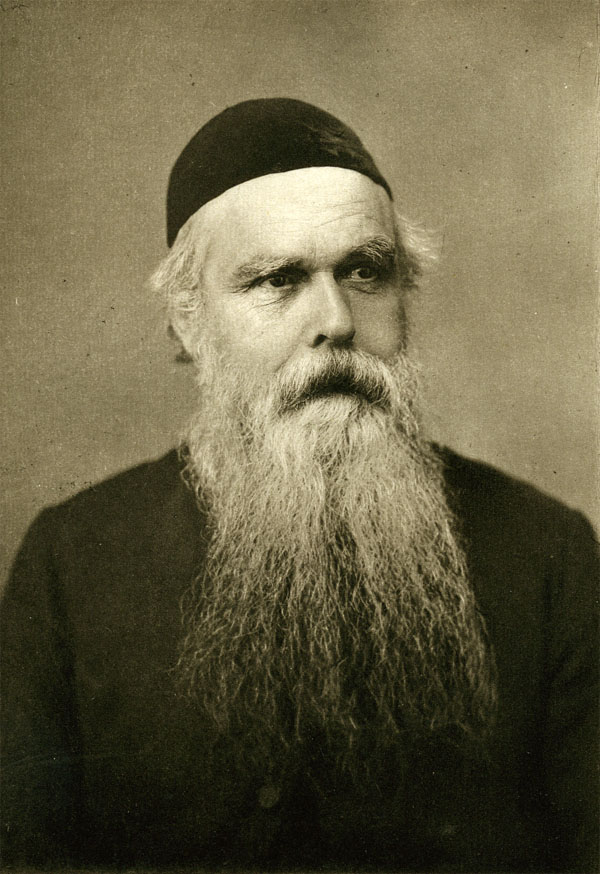
Henry Whitehead.

Henry Whitehead (22 September 1825 – 5 March 1896) was a Church of England priest and the assistant curate of St Luke's Church in Soho, London, during the 1854 cholera outbreak.

== Early life ==
Henry Whitehead was born on 22 September 1825 in Ramsgate, Kent, at Chatham House, a public school in which his father was master. He was the eighth of ten children, and grew up in the school, becoming in due course a pupil and, later, an assistant master. In 1847, having served for three years on the teaching staff under his father, Henry went up to Lincoln College, Oxford. After obtaining his Bachelor of Arts degree in 1850, he left to seek ordination as a priest, and was offered a post as assistant curate at £100 per annum by the Vicar of St. Luke's, Soho. In 1851, following his ordination as a deacon, he took up his duties among the residents of the crowded slums of the Berwick Street area. By the time the cholera broke out in 1854, he was a welcome visitor in the homes of his parishioners, a fact which proved of great value to him during the four months of his painstaking inquiry into cholera.

Whitehead continued his ministry at St. Luke's for two years after the epidemic before he left to seek another curacy. In the years that followed he served in several London parishes, where, apart from his ordinary duties, he took a practical interest in many of the social problems of the day, notably in juvenile delinquency.

== Research ==
A former believer in the miasma theory of disease, Whitehead worked to disprove false theories, but eventually came to prefer John Snow's idea that cholera spreads through water contaminated by human waste. Snow's work — and Whitehead's own investigations — convinced Whitehead that the Broad Street pump was the source of the local infections.

Whitehead then joined with Snow in tracking the contamination to a cesspool that leaked into the water table which led to the outbreak's index case. Whitehead identified a "Baby Lewis" at 40 Broad Street where a leakage in the basement contaminated the well as patient zero of the outbreak.

Whitehead's work with Snow combined demographic study with scientific observation, setting an important precedent for the burgeoning science of epidemiology.

== Later work ==
Whitehead served in several other London parishes before moving to Brampton, now in Cumbria, in 1874, where he was appointed the local vicar. He was instrumental in instigating a movement to build a new church in Brampton, which culminated in Phillip Webb's St. Martin's Church, the only church design of Webb's ever built and now a Grade I listed building. Whitehead moved on to Newlands in Cumberland in 1884, finally becoming vicar of Lanercost for five years until his death.
