= Broadwick Street =

Street in Soho, London

Coordinates: 51°30′49″N 00°08′09″W

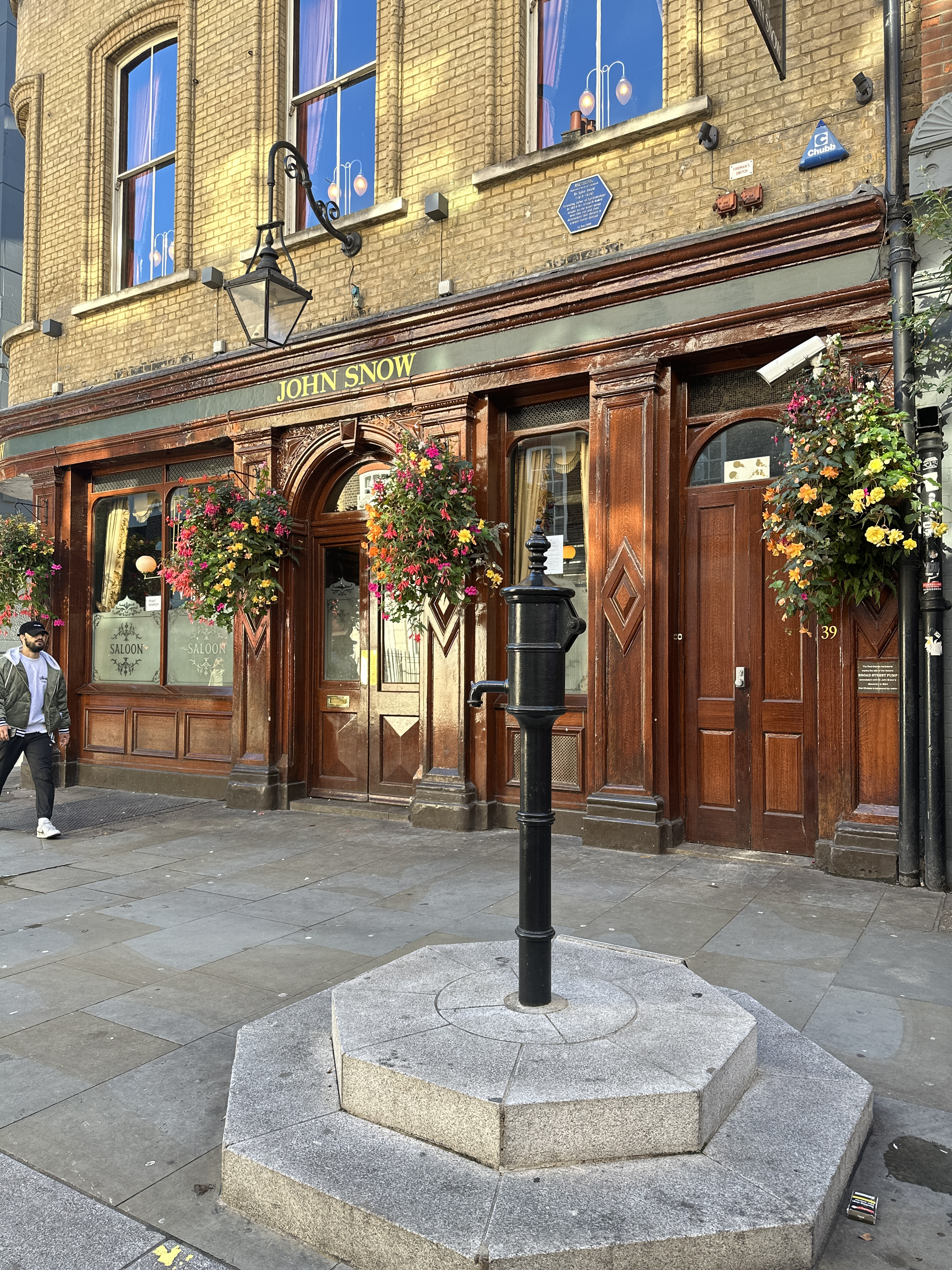
Broadwick Street, showing the John Snow memorial and pub

Broadwick Street (formerly Broad Street) is a street in Soho, City of Westminster, London. It runs for 0.18 miles (0.29 km) approximately west–east between Marshall Street and Wardour Street, crossing Berwick Street. The street extends across four separate estates, Colman Hedge Close, Little Gelding's, Pawlett's Garden and Pesthouse.

Broad Street was notorious as the centre of an 1854 outbreak of cholera. This outbreak killed a total of 700 people and only twelve escaped. Physician John Snow traced the outbreak to a public water pump on the street, and disabled the pump. Before this time, the disease was widely thought to be caused by air-borne 'miasma'; Snow's findings showed it to be water-borne.

A replica pump, together with an explanatory plaque, was erected close to the original location in 1992. The original pump was at the junction of Broad Street and Cambridge Street (today Lexington Street), close to the back wall of what today is the 'John Snow' pub. The site is subtly marked with a pink granite kerbstone in front of the small wall plaque.

A house on the corner of Broadwick and Marshall streets was the birthplace and childhood home of William Blake.

The street crosses, or meets, Wardour Street, Duck Lane, Berwick Street, Hopkins Street, Ingestre Place, Poland Street, Lexington Street, Dufours Place, Marshall Street and Carnaby Street.

== Current occupants ==
- No. 6: Agent Provocateur
- Nos. 15–17: Yauatcha
- No. 25: temper soho
- No. 31: itsu
- No. 33: Hearst Corporation
- No. 35: Pret a Manger
- No. 39: John Snow pub
- No. 45 Golden Age Theatre Company
- No. 71: Ooyala

== Former occupants ==
Nos. 48 & 50, Padgett & Braham Ltd. and Wakely & Wheeler Ltd, goldsmiths & silversmiths. Also at the same premises were T & A Wise Ltd. engravers, and The Flutemakers Guild, makers of flutes in precious metals.
