= Disease cluster =

Large incidence of a medical condition in a particular location or time frame

A disease cluster is an unusually large aggregation of a relatively uncommon disease (medical condition) or event within a particular geographical location or period. Recognition of a cluster depends on its size being greater than would be expected by chance. Identification of a suspected disease cluster may initially depend on anecdotal evidence. Epidemiologists and biostatisticians then assess whether the suspected cluster corresponds to an actual increase of disease in the area. Typically, when clusters are recognized, they are reported to public health departments in the local area. If clusters are of sufficient size and importance, they may be re-evaluated as outbreaks.

John Snow's pioneering investigation of the 1854 cholera outbreak in Soho, London, is seen as a classic example of the study of such a cluster.

== See also ==
- Cancer cluster
