= Julie Cliff =

Australian physician and epidemiologist in Mozambique

Julie Cliff AO
- Born: 1944 (age 81–82); Essendon, Victoria
- Occupations: Epidemiologist, physician
- Awards: Order of Australia (1996)

Academic background
- Education: University of Melbourne

Julie Laraine Cliff AO (born 1944) is an Australian physician and epidemiologist known for her work in the prevention and control of infectious diseases through investigating epidemics and health policy, particularly in Mozambique, where her career spanned around 40 years. There, her investigations revealed that the re-emergence of the paralytic disease konzo in poor rural communities was caused by high levels of cyanide in insufficiently processed cassava, as a result of changes in food preparation practices due to the economic effects of war and drought.

In 1996, Cliff was appointed an Officer of the Order of Australia, and awarded an honorary degree of Doctor of Laws by Monash University. In 2013, she delivered the John Snow Society's Pumphandle Lecture, titled "From London to Mozambique, from cholera to konzo".

== Early life and education ==
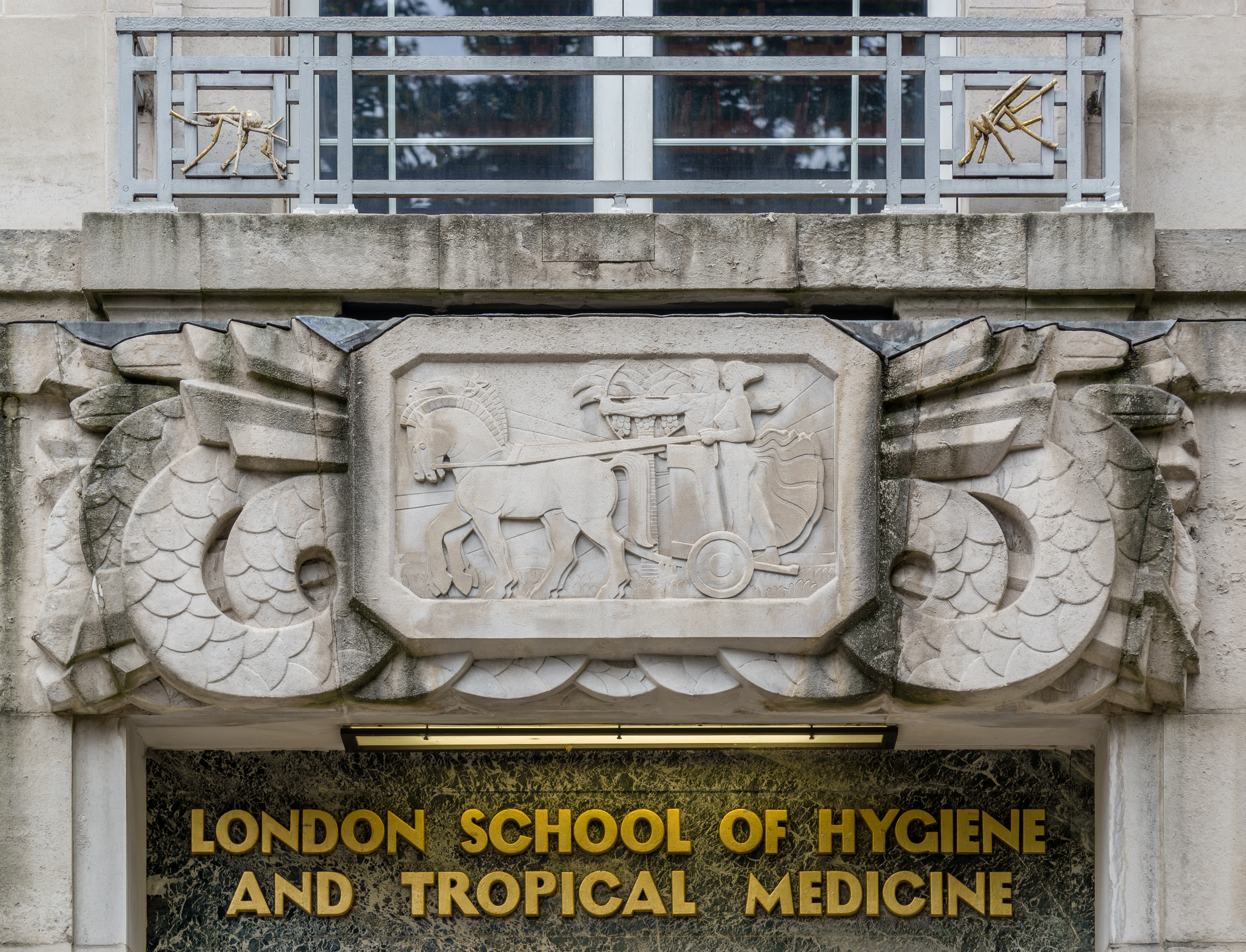
London School of Hygiene and Tropical Medicine

Julie Cliff was born in 1944 in Essendon, Victoria. As a medical student she took up an elective in New Guinea, and in 1967 graduated MBBS from the University of Melbourne. She subsequently completed a diploma in tropical medicine at the London School of Hygiene and Tropical Medicine (LSHTM) and post-graduate medical training in London.

== Early career ==
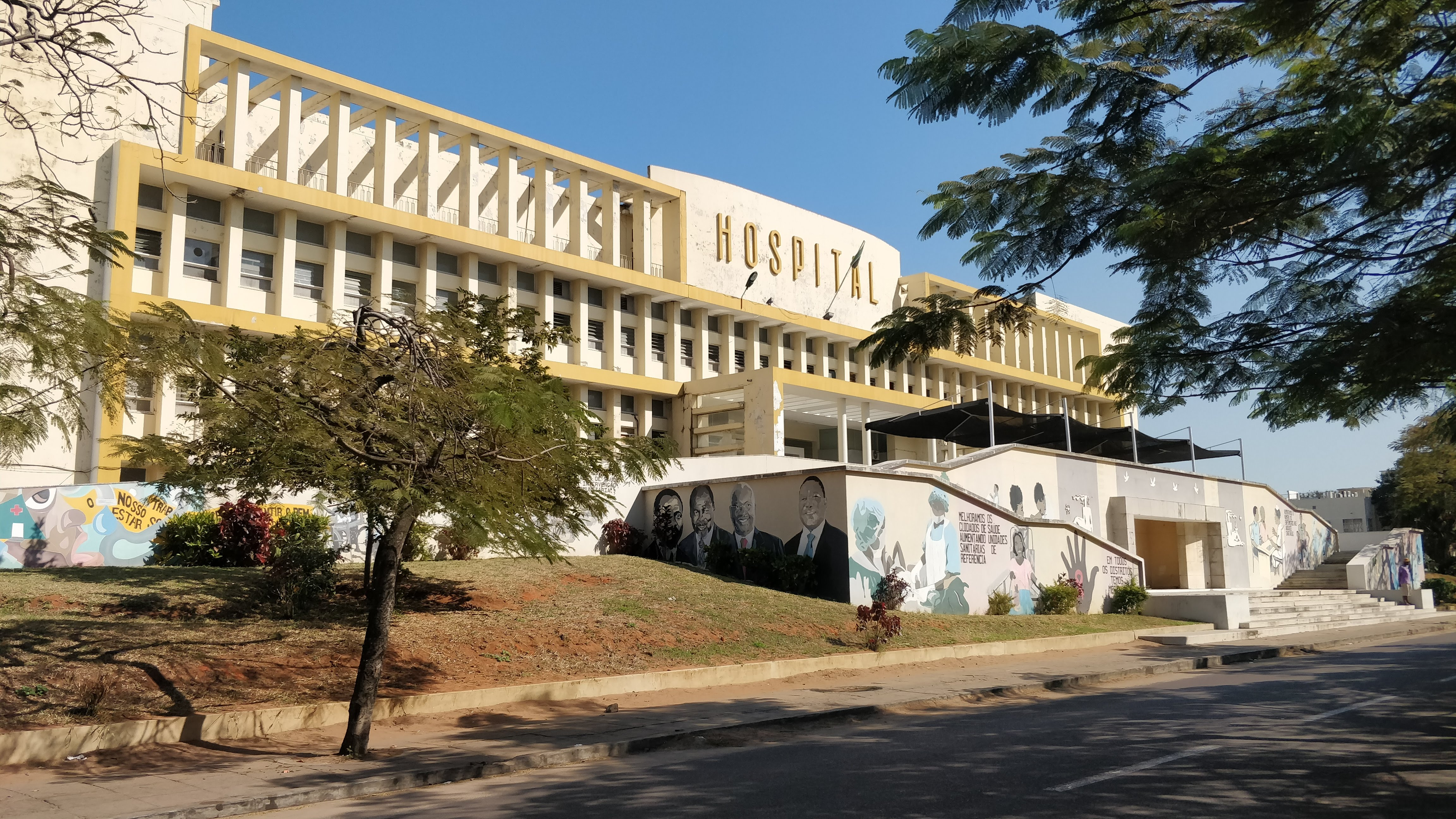
Central Hospital Maputo

In 1974 Cliff was appointed honorary medical specialist at Muhimbili Hospital and lecturer in medicine at the University of Dar es Salaam in Tanzania; spending two years in that country. From 1976 to 1979 she was medical specialist and director of the Infectious Diseases Unit at Maputo Central Hospital in Mozambique, joining there shortly after the country gained independence. She was part of a group of experts employed to rebuild a health service in Mozambique, a detailed account of which is given in her chapter "An orphan disease in Mozambique" in Julie Pearlman's The Practice of International Health (2009). (Note: By independence in 1975, most doctors in Mozambique had emigrated, and of those that were left, most were concentrated in less needy areas. The country's over nine million population was at the time left served by around 50 physicians.) In 1976 she was also appointed professor auxiliar Faculdade de Medicina at Maputo's Eduardo Mondlane University and remained so until 1998. Her work there developed a close co-ordination with the University of Melbourne.

From 1980 to 1984 Cliff was epidemiologist at Mozambique's National Directorate of Preventative Medicine. She returned to the LSHTM to complete a master's degree in community health and then moved back to Mozambique. Subsequently, she spent four years as head of the Epidemiology Section of the National Directorate of Heath of the Ministry of Health in Maputo, and two years as acting head of the Department of Community Health in the Faculdade de Medicina Universidade Eduardo Mondlane.

=== Konzo ===
Internationally, Cliff has become known for her role in revealing that the re-emergence of the paralytic disease konzo in poor rural communities in Mozambique was caused by high levels of cyanide in insufficiently processed cassava, as a result of changes in food preparation practices due to the economic effects of war and drought. Her colleagues in this work included Howard Bradley and Hans Rosling. When she was first sent to investigate the outbreak in 1981, it was thought to be caused by polio. Then another infectious cause, or chemical or biological warfare was suspected. The eventual conclusion was what an elderly village man had told her at the onset; that "this disease has happened because the rain has not washed our cassava". Her study showing these findings was published in 2011, and highlighted that it particularly affected women and children, and spared breast fed babies. Her paper revealed how desperate times changed cooking practices. Instead of the usual three day soaking of peeled cassava roots followed by drying it out in the sun and then grinding it to a flour, poverty and drought had led to hunger and resulted in shortening the preparation process. This, in addition to the direct effect of drought increasing the concentration of naturally occurring cynogens in raw cassava, caused higher amounts of cyanide in the processed cassava. This led to the consumption of cassava before the cyanide was washed out. Her team subsequently discovered further outbreaks of konzo in Africa.

== Later career ==
In 1988 she moved to the United States, where she became international epidemiologic fellow at the Centers for Disease Control and Prevention in Atlanta. Cliff later held posts at the Centre for International Health at the Burnet Institute in Melbourne, and at the Department of Global Health, University of Washington.

In 2000, Cliff co-authored a chapter titled "Lovers, Hookers, and Wives: Unbraiding the Social Contradictions of Urban Mozambican Women's Sexual and Economic Lives" in Meredith Turshen's African Women's Health using real life stories to describe how many poor women in post-war Mozambique put themselves at risk of HIV through the exchange of sex for essentials needed to survive.

== Honors and awards ==
In 1989 Cliff became visiting fellow at the National Centre for Epidemiology and Population Health in Canberra, Australia, and in 1993 SmithKline Beecham awarded her a fellowship.

In 1996, Cliff was appointed an Officer of the Order of Australia, and awarded an honorary degree of Doctor of Laws by Monash University. She is a fellow of the Royal College of Physicians of London.

=== Pumphandle Lecture 2013 ===
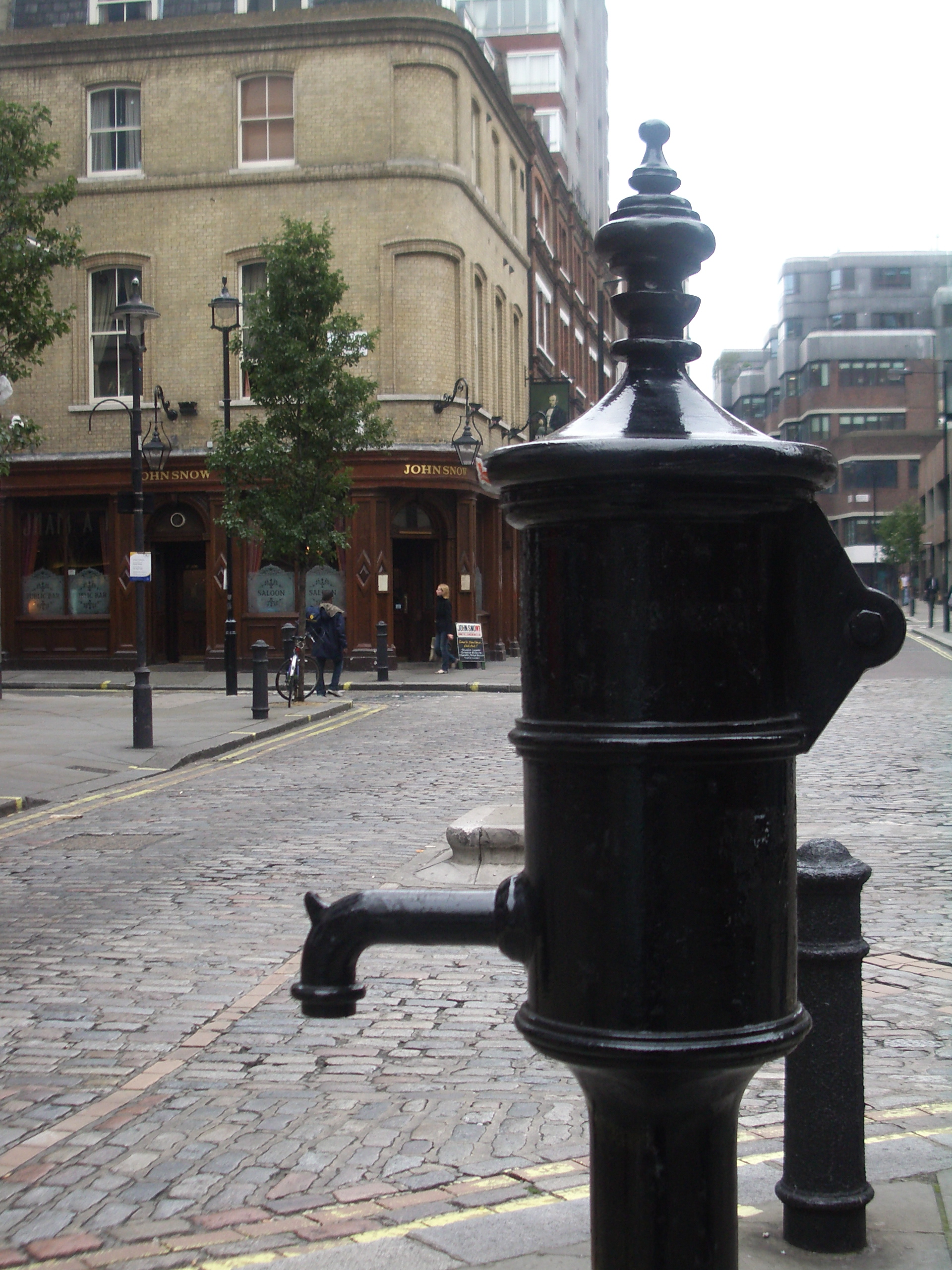
John Snow pub and pump as it was at the time of Cliff's lecture

In 2013 she presented the John Snow Society's Pumphandle Lecture in London, two years after her colleague Rosling had delivered it. Titled "From London to Mozambique, from cholera to konzo", members would have proceeded to the John Snow pub afterwards.

== Selected publications ==
- Cliff, Julie; Lundquist, Per; Rosling, Hans; Sörbo, Bo; Wide, Leif (1986). "Thyroid function in a cassava-eating population affected by epidemic spastic paraparesis". Acta Endocrinologica. 113 (4): 523–528. doi:10.1530/acta.0.1130523. ISSN 0001-5598. PMID 3788422.
- Cliff, J.; Muquingue, H.; Nhassico, D.; Nzwalo, H.; Bradbury, J.H. (March 2011). "Konzo and continuing cyanide intoxication from cassava in Mozambique". Food and Chemical Toxicology. 49 (3): 631–635. doi:10.1016/j.fct.2010.06.056. ISSN 1873-6351. PMID 20654676.
- Taibo, Cátia Luciana Abdulfattáhe; Cliff, Julie; Rosling, Hans; Hall, Casey Daniel; Park, Meeyoung Mattie; Frimpong, Joseph Asamoah (2017). "An epidemic of spastic paraparesis of unknown aetiology in Northern Mozambique". The Pan African Medical Journal. 27 (Suppl 1): 6. doi:10.11604/pamj.supp.2017.27.1.12623. ISSN 1937-8688. PMC 5500942. PMID 28721170. S2CID 19262074.
- Salomão, Cristolde; Nacima, Amílcar; Cuamba, Lutero; Gujral, Lorna; Amiel, Olga; Baltazar, Cynthia; Cliff, Julie; Gudo, Eduardo Samo (July 2017). "Epidemiology, clinical features and risk factors for human rabies and animal bites during an outbreak of rabies in Maputo and Matola cities, Mozambique, 2014: Implications for public health interventions for rabies control". PLOS Neglected Tropical Diseases. 11 (7) e0005787. doi:10.1371/journal.pntd.0005787. ISSN 1935-2735. PMC 5542695. PMID 28742094.
- Gudo, Eduardo Samo; Falk, Kerstin; Cliff, Julie (2018). "Historical Perspective of Arboviruses in Mozambique and Its Implication for Current and Future Epidemics". Dengue and Zika: Control and Antiviral Treatment Strategies. Advances in Experimental Medicine and Biology. Vol. 1062. pp. 11–18. doi:10.1007/978-981-10-8727-1_2. ISBN 978-981-10-8726-4. ISSN 0065-2598. PMID 29845522.
