= Godal =

Godal is a surname. Notable people with the surname include:

- Anne Marit Godal (born 1972), Norwegian encyclopedist
- Bjørn Tore Godal (born 1945), Norwegian politician
- Boris Godál (born 1987), Slovak footballer
- Edward Godal, British film producer
- Ingvald Godal (1934–2019), Norwegian politician
- Tom Godal (born 1953), Norwegian motorcycle speedway rider
- Tord Godal (1909–2002), Norwegian theologian and bishop
- Tore Godal (born 1939), Norwegian physician
