= Surinder Singh Bakhshi =

British writer and physician (born 1937)

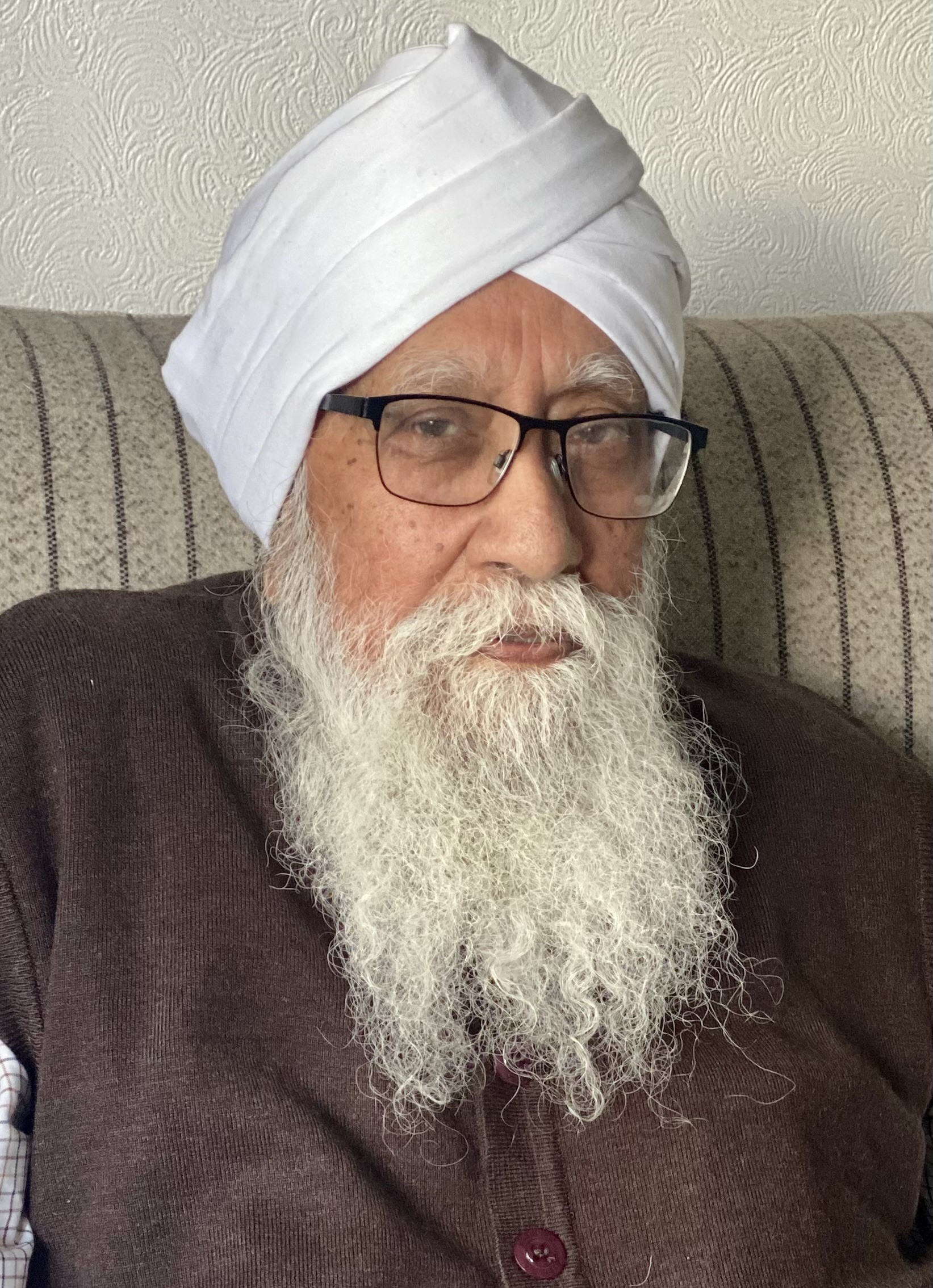
- Bakhshi in 2022
- Born: 1937 (age 88–89); Dar es Salaam, Tanganyika Territory
- Education: Makerere University, Kampala, Uganda
- Occupation: Medical officer of environmental health to Birmingham area (appointed 1977)
- Years active: 1974–2003
- Known for: Managing community containment of smallpox during the 1978 smallpox outbreak in the United Kingdom
- Medical career
- Profession: Physician
- Field: Public health
- Institutions: Birmingham Area Health Authority

Surinder Singh Bakhshi (born 1937) is a British writer and physician, who in 1977 was appointed medical officer of environmental health to the Birmingham Area Health Authority, where he led the successful contact tracing and quarantine effort in the community during the 1978 smallpox outbreak in the United Kingdom.

Bakhshi received his medical degree from Makerere University in Kampala, Uganda. After completing house jobs he worked at a hospital by the Zambezi in Zambia, before moving to the United States, where he held a Rockefeller Fellowship in public health at the University of Michigan. In 1974, after a medical posting that involved managing an outbreak of cholera among refugees from Mozambique, he moved to England and in 1977 was interviewed for a medical officer appointment in Birmingham. In addition to his efforts in containing smallpox, he dealt with other outbreaks in Birmingham including hepatitis A, hepatitis B, meningitis and typhoid.

In retirement, Bakhshi published Tuberculosis in the United Kingdom: A tale of two nations (2006) and Sikhs in the Diaspora: A Modern Guide to the Practice of Sikh Faith. A Knowledge Compendium for the Global Age (2008).

== Early life and education ==
Surinder Singh Bakhshi, (Note: Sometimes misspelled as Bakshi.) known as Surinderjit to his friends, was born in 1937 in Dar es Salaam, Tanganyika, to Sohan Singh and Amrit Kaur. His family had its origins in the Ras Koh Hills in Balochistan (now in Pakistan), and during the interwar years his parents left to work in East Africa.

After spending his early years in Dar es Salaam among a large Indian community, he gained admission to study medicine in 1960 at Makerere University in Kampala, Uganda, from where he graduated in 1965. (Note: The medical school at Makerere University in the mid-1960s had a wide network with reputable international specialist centres and experts.) That year, he married Rajinder Kaur, his childhood sweetheart.

== Early career ==
After completing house jobs Bakhshi's first medical officer post was at a hospital in Mongu, Barotseland. Situated by the Zambezi in Zambia, he treated mostly snakebites and tuberculosis in the Barotse population. After three years there he moved to the United States after a brief period in managing immunisation programmes in the Zambia and then taking a worldwide tour. In the US, he held a Rockefeller Fellowship at the University of Michigan, from where he completed a master's degree in public health in 1971. On returning to Zambia, he was appointed regional medical officer and became involved in containing a cholera outbreak among refugees from Mozambique.

In 1974, he moved to England, where his parents had already settled, and took up a post as registrar in Kingston upon Thames before becoming senior registrar in Gloucestershire, where he resided at Slimbridge.

=== Birmingham ===
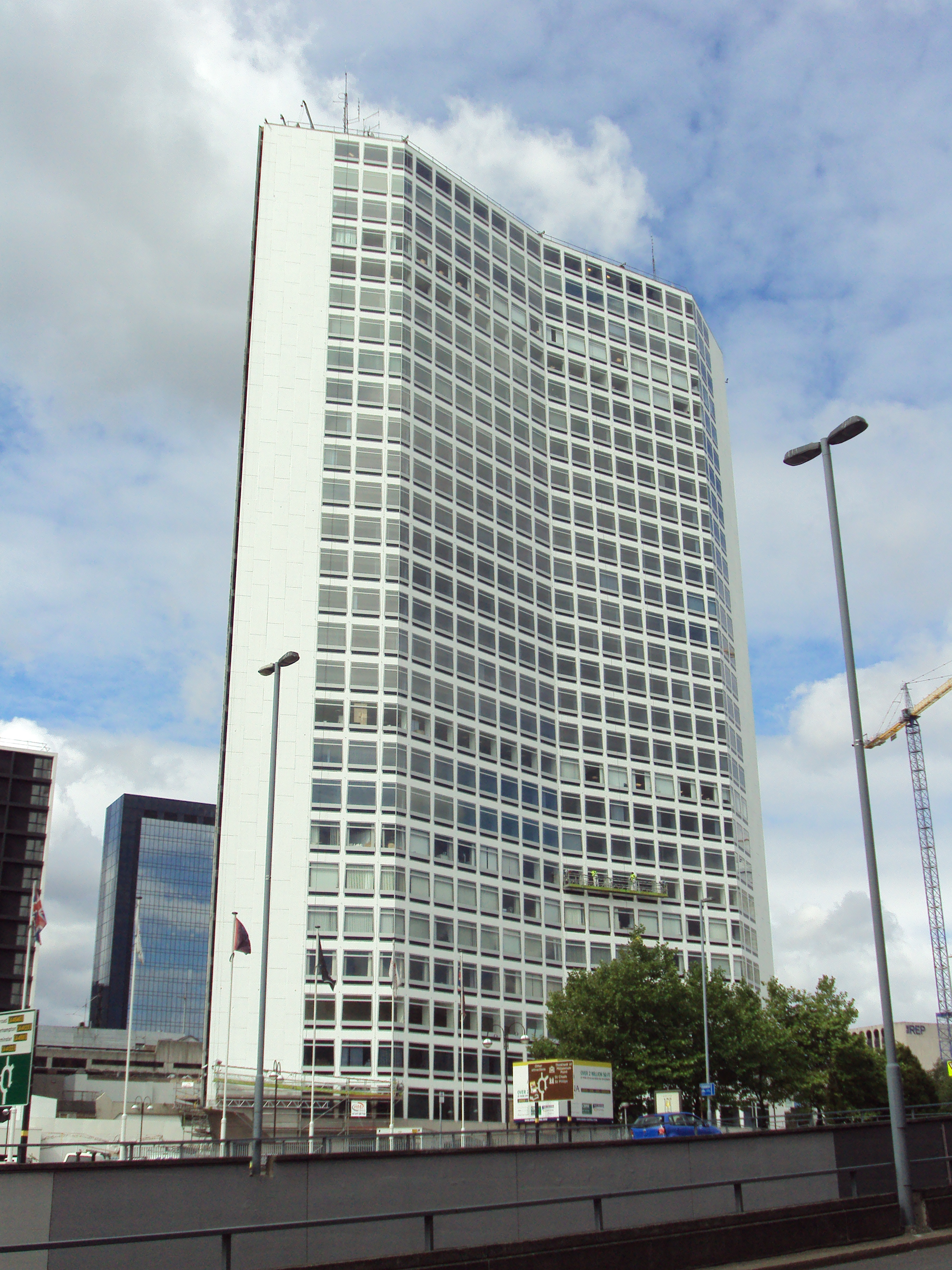
The Alpha Tower, Birmingham

In 1977, Bakhshi was appointed medical officer of environmental health for the Birmingham Area Health Authority. (Note: The medical officer of environmental health was a relatively new post at the time, responsible to the local authority for preventing communicable disease and initiating appropriate measures. It largely replaced many duties of the former medical officer of health, a statutory officer with responsibilities to the local authority in preventing disease, which was discontinued following the reorganisation of the National Health Service Act of 1973. The Birmingham Area Health Authority at the time was based in Alpha Tower, Broad Street, Birmingham.) An account of his first year there is given in Mark Pallen's book The Last Days of Smallpox (2018). Bakhshi told him that on the day of the interview, he was told by the reception that "people like him" were not allowed to use the lift so he walked the 13 flights of stairs to his interview in Alpha Tower. He recounted in an oral history and in interviews by Pallen and journalist Sally Williams, that instead of the usual eight interviewers, there was surprise that an Indian had applied for the post and 20 turned up to interview him.

After a two-hour interview in which he was hardly asked any questions as the interviewers spent most of the time asking each other questions, he was asked to wait before being informed that a decision was inconclusive, but when he arrived back home he received a call confirming he got the job. He told Williams that "When I started work, people wouldn't speak to me – not even my secretary, for a couple of weeks. I used to tell my wife, 'I feel very sorry for them – they look at me and feel unhappy.'" In that first year in post, he had to deal with an outbreak of hepatitis B originating from an acupuncturist. With his family home in Gloucester, he shared his time between Birmingham in the week and home for weekends. His office was allocated in the University of Birmingham Medical School, along the same corridor as Alasdair Geddes.

== 1978 smallpox outbreak ==
In 1978, around a year into his post, Bakhshi was tasked with leading the operational management of public health and containing community spread of smallpox during the smallpox outbreak in Birmingham. He first came to hear of smallpox in Birmingham on 25 August 1978 and the first meeting of the control of smallpox outbreak advisory committee took place that same day. Under the chairmanship of William Nicol, Medical Officer to the Birmingham area, the committee included Henry Bedson, Spence Galbraith, Geddes, and Bakhshi.

Of the two main tasks of the committee; finding out how smallpox arose in the first place and identifying and containing spread of smallpox in the community, Bakhshi's role, now designated "Outbreaks Liaison Officer", was contact tracing and quarantine, home visits to contacts, vaccinations, and antibody injections. Pallen explains that Bakhshi secured unrestricted funding, the use of three floors of Birmingham's Holiday Inn, the black cab service, food from local restaurants, and the recruitment of around 60 doctors, 40 nurses, 85 environmental health inspectors and associates, six officers for disinfection and near a hundred administrative staff. Health records, media and radio were utilised to pin down almost all contacts and they were isolated within 24 hours. With colleagues, he devised a method of categorising contacts and delegated to them either medical staff, health visitors or others accordingly. Bakhshi took responsibility of visiting and dealing with the closest contacts of Janet Parker, the index case. This included those that Parker lived with and the two family physicians that recently treated her.

It was Bakhshi who informed the World Health Organization in mid-October, seven weeks after the onset of the outbreak, that the outbreak was contained and the alert was lifted. The containment efforts were successful, and the official report on the outbreak would later state:

We would like to record our appreciation of the speed and thoroughness with which Dr Nicol, the area Medical Officer, and his staff and also the staff of the Birmingham University medical School reacted to contain the spread of illness when smallpox had been diagnosed. Their action in dealing with the task of tracing isolating and vaccinating all close contacts of Mrs Parker, and in disinfecting all areas of possible contamination was impressive and contributed considerably to preventing a far wider spread of infection.

During his tenure as medical officer in Birmingham, he was responsible for containing other outbreaks including hepatitis A, meningitis, and typhoid.

== Later life ==
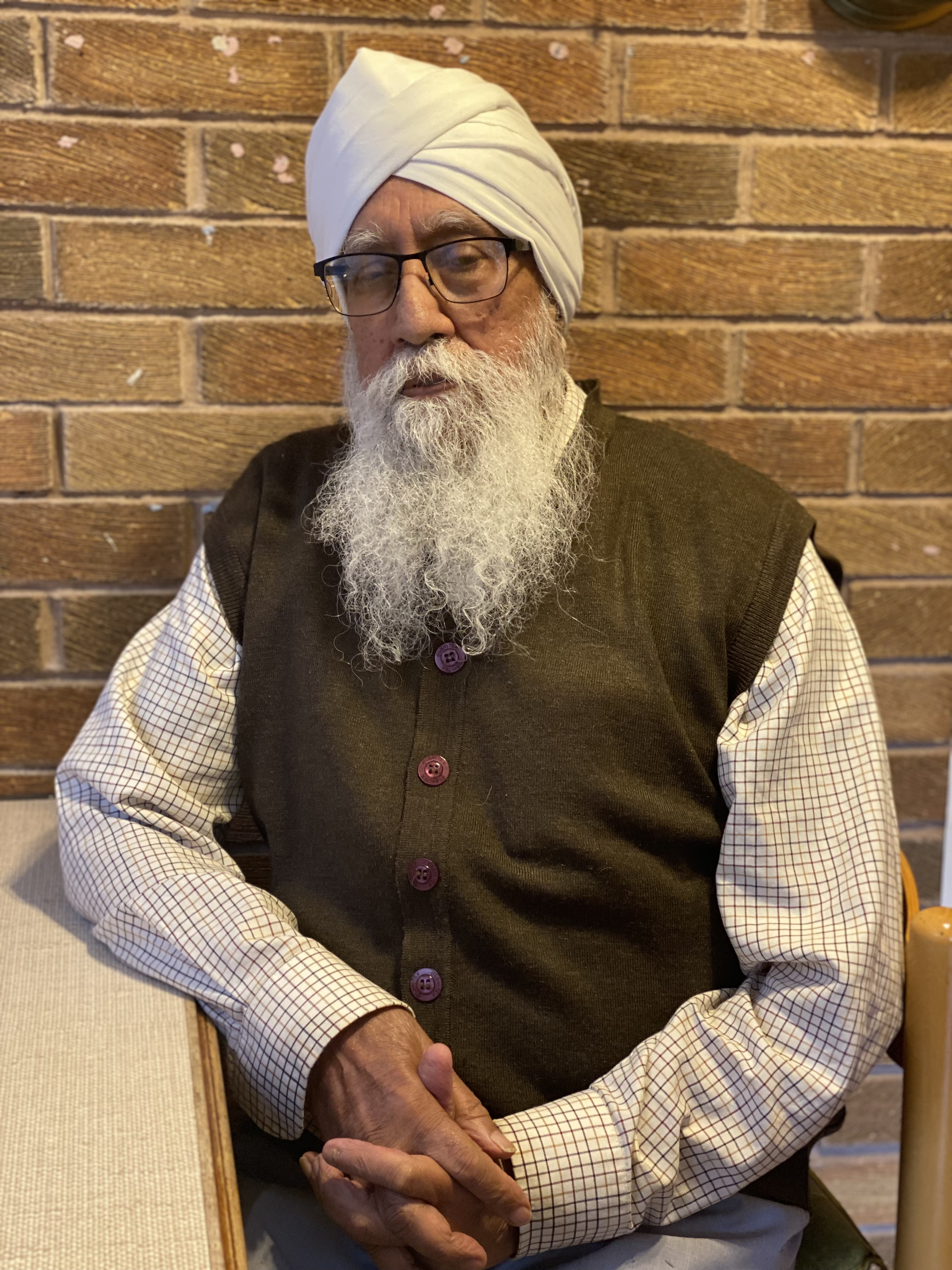
Surinder Singh Bakhshi

In retirement, Bakhshi published Tuberculosis in the United Kingdom: A Tale of Two Nations (2006) and Sikhs in the Diaspora: A Modern Guide to the Practice of Sikh Faith. A Knowledge Compendium for the Global Age (2008).

In Williams' article in The Guardian (2020) during the COVID-19 pandemic on whether the 1978 smallpox outbreak could provide any lessons, Bakhshi's approach was considered personal and locally led, and he explained that "contact tracing and containment are in the genes of any public health doctor."

== Selected publications ==
=== Articles ===
- Nicol, W.; Bakhshi, S.S. (April 1980). "Exotic Infectious Diseases: Smallpox". Royal Society of Health Journal. 100 (2): 41–47. doi:10.1177/146642408010000202. PMID 6992193. S2CID 37556538.
- Bakhshi, Surinder Singh; Ali, Shaukat (1995). "Knowledge, attitude and behaviour of TB patients". Journal of Public Health Medicine. 17 (3): 343–348. ISSN 0957-4832. JSTOR 45160661. PMID 8527189.
- Bakhshi, Surinder S.; Hawker, Jeremy; Ali, Shaukat (August 1997). "The epidemiology of tuberculosis by ethnic group in Birmingham and its implications for future Trends in tuberculosis in the UK". Ethnicity & Health. 2 (3): 147–153. doi:10.1080/13557858.1997.9961823. PMID 9426979.
- Bakhshi, S. S. (1 September 1997). "Framework of epidemiological principles underlying chemical incidents surveillance plans and training implications for public health practitioners". Journal of Public Health. 19 (3): 333–340. doi:10.1093/oxfordjournals.pubmed.a024640. PMID 9347460.
- Hawker, Jeremy I.; Bakhshi, Surinder S.; Ali, Shaukat; Farrington, C. Paddy (16 October 1999). "Ecological analysis of ethnic differences in relation between tuberculosis and poverty". BMJ. 319 (7216): 1031–1034. doi:10.1136/bmj.319.7216.1031. ISSN 0959-8138. PMC 28253. PMID 10521193.

=== Books ===
- Tuberculosis in the United Kingdom: A Tale of Two Nations. Leicester, UK: Matador. 2006. ISBN 1-905237-53-7. OCLC 64315598.
- Sikhs in the Diaspora: A Modern Guide to Practice of the Sikh Faith: A Knowledge Compendium for the Global Age. Birmingham, UK: Sikh Publishing House in association with Ramgarhia Sikh Temple. 2008. ISBN 978-0-9560728-0-1.
