= Nick Ward (physician) =

British physician and expert on smallpox

Nick Ward is a British physician and expert on smallpox. He worked in Botswana before having lead roles during the World Health Organization's smallpox eradication programme in Bangladesh and was the first coordinator of the Global Polio Eradication Initiative.

In 1993 Ward delivered the inaugural Pumphandle Lecture of the John Snow Society.
