= Spence Galbraith =

British public health physician (1927–2008)

- Born: Nicol Spence Galbraith; 17 March 1927; Southborough, Kent
- Died: 7 August 2008 (aged 81)
- Education: Tonbridge School; London University; Guy's Hospital; London School of Hygiene and Tropical Medicine
- Occupation: Epidemiologist
- Known for: Founding the PHLS Communicable Disease Surveillance Centre (1977–1987); Role in UK smallpox outbreak (1978); Alerting of Infected blood products (1983)
- Medical career
- Profession: Physician
- Field: Public health
- Institutions: Lewisham Hospital; Guy's Hospital; Brook General Hospital; London School of Hygiene and Tropical Medicine; St Bartholomew's Hospital
- Awards: Freedom of the City of London (1976); Jenner Medal of the Royal Society of Medicine (1991); Pumphandle Lecture (1994)

Nicol Spence Galbraith (17 March 1927 – 7 August 2008) was a British physician in public health and founding director of the Central Public Health Laboratory Service (PHLS) Communicable Disease Surveillance Centre (CDSC). The results of his efforts were demonstrated in 1978, when he represented the PHLS following the smallpox outbreak in Birmingham. Five years later, he warned the government of possible infected blood products.

In 1958, Galbraith joined the Epidemiological Research Laboratory of the Central PHLS, Colindale, which at the time was part of the Medical Research Council (MRC). After five years of working with vaccine trials, polio vaccine safety, and monitoring of foodborne disease, he was appointed deputy medical officer of health for Newham, East London, and in 1974 became the area medical officer. In 1976, he re-joined the PHLS and as director of the CDSC, set up teaching courses for NHS epidemiologists, and improved surveillance programmes in infectious disease.

In 1991, Galbraith was awarded the Jenner Medal of the Royal Society of Medicine, and in 1994, he delivered the John Snow Society's Pumphandle Lecture.

== Early life and education ==
Nicol Spence Galbraith was born in Southborough, Kent, on 17 March 1927, to Samuel Nicol Galbraith, the then medical officer of health for south west Kent. He completed his early education at Tonbridge School, before gaining a place at London University to study medicine, and subsequently qualified in 1950 from Guy's Hospital.

== Early career ==
Galbraith completed house officer posts at Lewisham Hospital and Guy's. In 1952, he enlisted with the Royal Army Medical Corps (RAMC) to do his National Service. The following year, he was posted to Egypt, where he served as deputy assistant director of army health, based at the Suez Canal zone. There, he had to attend to a paratyphoid B fever outbreak. In 1954, he gained the diploma in public health after completing studies at the London School of Hygiene and Tropical Medicine (LSHTM).

In 1958, after four years of house jobs at Brook General Hospital and the Lewisham Hospital, Galbraith joined the Epidemiological Research Laboratory of the Central Public Health Laboratory Service (PHLS), Colindale, which at the time was part of the Medical Research Council (MRC). He remained there as an epidemiologist for five years. There, his work involved looking at vaccine trials, polio vaccine safety, and monitoring of foodborne disease. In 1963, he was appointed deputy medical officer of health for Newham, East London. The following year, he made his first call for a national epidemiological service that would be centrally co-ordinated. In 1974, he became the area medical officer of the City and East London Area Health Authority. (Note: A post created following the re-organisation of the NHS on 1 April 1974. Local authorities in health were abolished, and area health authorities introduced.) During that time, he continued work on polio and BCG vaccines, and called for a centrally funded co-ordinated national epidemiological service, based on the American Centers for Disease Control and Prevention (CDC). He had previously first published on the case in 1968, in an article titled "Epidemiology and the Green Paper – a National Epidemiological Service".

== Later career ==
In 1976, Galbraith re-joined the PHLS after being asked to establish a national unit that could report and control communicable disease. The following year, he became the founding director of the Communicable Disease Surveillance Centre (CDSC). It consisted of Galbraith, one other medical officer and a secretary. Administered by the Central Public Health Laboratory Service (PHLS), he chose the Broad Street pump as its logo. That year, he visited Alexander Langmuir at the CDC in Atlanta and subsequently began expanding the CDSC. As director of the CDSC, he set up teaching courses for NHS epidemiologists, and improved surveillance programmes in infectious disease. The weekly bulletin was his creation. At the same time, he lectured at St Bartholomew's Hospital Medical School and at the LSHTM.

=== 1978 smallpox outbreak in Birmingham ===
The results of Galbraith's successful efforts as director of the CDSC were demonstrated in 1978, when he represented the PHLS following the smallpox outbreak in Birmingham, attending the initial meeting at Birmingham area Health Authority's headquarters along with Alasdair Geddes, Surinder S. Bakhshi, William Nicol, and Henry Bedson. To assist at a local level, he transferred a few epidemiologists to Birmingham and confirmed that testing would be done at the Colindale laboratory. In 1981, he was unsuccessful in his call for a local surveillance system that would include a clinical epidemiologist.

=== Contaminated blood scandal ===
On 9 May 1983, after reviewing literature revealing that 11 cases of AIDS in the United States, three in Spain, and one in Wales, were detected in people who had received American Factor VIII, Galbraith wrote to Ian Field of the UK Department of Health and Social Security, and suggested to withdraw products made in the US from blood donated after 1978:

I have reviewed the literature and come to the conclusion that all blood products made from blood donated in the USA after 1978 should be withdrawn from use until the risk of AIDS transmission by these products has been clarified.

The paper Galbraith submitted on the matter was considered and rejected at a meeting of the biological sub-committee of the Committee on Safety of Medicines on 13 July 1983.

=== Other ===
In 1986, Galbraith contributed to the founding of the British Paediatric Surveillance Unit, which functioned to detect new diseases in children. A vaccine advocate, he developed a way to examine risks of live polio vaccine, and was able to show the safety and efficacy of giving the BCG, diphtheria-tetanus, and oral polio vaccines at the same time. At the CDSC, he created an immunisation department for monitoring vaccine safety, efficacy, and coverage.

== Awards and honours ==
For his efforts as area medical officer in East London, Galbraith was made Freedom of the City of London in 1976. As president of the Epidemiology and Community Medicine Section of the Royal Society of Medicine (RSM), he delivered his presidential address in 1980. In 1991, he was awarded the RSM's Jenner Medal. In 1994, he delivered the John Snow Society's Pumphandle Lecture on the life of John Snow, titled "Dr John Snow – Early Life and Later Triumphs. An exploration of Snow's work from the epidemiological perspective".

== Personal and family ==
Galbraith married Zina-Mary née Cullingworth Flood, in 1952. They had three daughters. At a young age, due to severe rheumatoid arthritis, he had two hip replacements.

== Death ==
Galbraith died on 7 August 2008, following a heart attack.

== Selected publications ==
=== Articles ===
- Galbraith, N.S. (December 1968). "Epidemiology and the Green Paper – a National Epidemiological Service". The Lancet. 292 (7582): 1339–1340. doi:10.1016/S0140-6736(68)91831-X. PMID 4177402.
- Galbraith, N. S. (April 1967). "Salmonella Infection in a Meat Products Factory: The Role of the Medical Officer of Health". Journal of Applied Bacteriology. 30 (1): 148–158. doi:10.1111/j.1365-2672.1967.tb00284.x. ISSN 0021-8847. PMID 6045099.
- Galbraith, N. S.; Young, Susan E. J. (May 1980). "Communicable disease control: the development of a laboratory associated national epidemiological service in England and Wales". Journal of Public Health. 2 (2): 135–143. doi:10.1093/oxfordjournals.pubmed.a043298. PMID 7398237.
- Galbraith, N S (January 1981). "A National Public Health Service". Journal of the Royal Society of Medicine. 74 (1): 16–21. doi:10.1177/014107688107400105. ISSN 0141-0768. PMC 1438324. PMID 7007637.
- Galbraith, N. S.; Forbes, P.; Clifford, C. (12 June 1982). "Communicable disease associated with milk and dairy products in England and Wales 1951–80". British Medical Journal (Clin Res Ed). 284 (6331): 1761–1765. doi:10.1136/bmj.284.6331.1761. ISSN 0007-1447. PMC 1498668. PMID 6805699.
- Galbraith, N. S.; Barrett, Nicola J.; Stanwell-Smith, Rosalind (August 1987). "Water and Disease After Croydon: A Review of Water-borne and Water-associated Disease in the UK 1937–86". Water and Environment Journal. 1 (1): 7–21. Bibcode:1987WaEnJ...1....7G. doi:10.1111/j.1747-6593.1987.tb01184.x. ISSN 1747-6585.
- Galbraith, N. S. (1989). "CDSC: From Cox to Acheson". Community Medicine. 11 (3): 187–199. doi:10.1093/oxfordjournals.pubmed.a042467. ISSN 0142-2456. JSTOR 45156808. PMID 2691191.
- Galbraith, N. S. (1991). "Quarterly Communicable Disease Review January to March 1991: From the PHLS Communicable Disease Surveillance Centre". Journal of Public Health. 13 (3): 219. doi:10.1093/oxfordjournals.pubmed.a042622.

=== Books ===
- Infection. London: Grant McIntyre. 1982.
- Dr John Snow: his early years. London: The Royal Institute of Public Health. 2002.
