= Henry Bedson =

British virologist

Henry Bedson, MD, MRCP
- Henry Bedson
- Born: Henry Samuel Bedson; 29 September 1929
- Died: 6 September 1978 (aged 48); Birmingham
- Cause of death: Suicide
- Education: Brighton, Hove and Sussex Grammar School; London Hospital Medical College
- Medical career
- Institutions: University of Liverpool University of Birmingham
- Sub-specialties: Virology

Henry Samuel Bedson, MD, MRCP (29 September 1929 – 6 September 1978), was a British virologist and head of the Department of Medical Microbiology at Birmingham Medical School, where his research focused on smallpox and monkeypox virus.

Bedson was head of the smallpox laboratory at Birmingham when Janet Parker, a photographer working above the laboratory, contracted smallpox and died.

Bedson died on 6 September 1978, five days after being discovered with self-inflicted wounds to his throat.

The verdict in court was that Bedson was "not guilty". How Parker exactly became infected with smallpox remains unknown.

== Early life and education ==
Henry Bedson was born on 29 September 1929 to Sir Samuel Bedson and Dorothea Annie Hoffert, the second of three sons. He was educated at Brighton, Hove and Sussex Grammar School, before gaining admission to the London Hospital Medical College, where his father was professor of bacteriology. He graduated in 1952 after having received the Charrington prize for anatomical dissection, a distinction in the second bachelor of medicine examination, and the prize for clinical surgery.

== Career ==
After completing his junior medical and surgical posts, Bedson took up an appointment in morbid anatomy and in clinical pathology in 1953. A year later, he received a more senior appointment as junior registrar in pathology. In 1955 he joined the Royal Army Medical Corps (RAMC) and served in Hong Kong until July 1957.

Bedson's career in virology began in 1958 when he was appointed the John W. Garrett research fellow at the University of Liverpool's department of bacteriology, where he would spend the next six years. At Liverpool, he worked under the supervision of Allan Downie, a leading expert in poxviruses. He was appointed assistant lecturer in the following year and full lecturer a year later. In 1961 he invented the "Bedson ceiling test".

In 1964 Bedson was appointed Senior Lecturer and honorary NHS consultant in bacteriology and virology in the Department of Virology at the University of Birmingham. In 1969, he was promoted to Reader in Virology and in 1976 to professor and head of Birmingham's new Department of Medical Microbiology.

Bedson's interest and research from his time at Liverpool focused on whitepox viruses, smallpox and monkeypox. In 1976 he was a member of the International Commission for the assessment of smallpox eradication in Pakistan and Afghanistan and of the World Health Organization informal group on monkeypox and related poxviruses viruses, in addition to the dangerous pathogens advisory group established by the Department of Health and Social Security.

== Smallpox outbreak in Birmingham (1978) ==
In 1978, Bedson was head of the smallpox laboratory at Birmingham Medical School.

In late August 1978, during the bank holiday weekend, Bedson was on-call when he was called by Alasdair Geddes, the region's smallpox expert, to examine fluid samples taken from blisters of Janet Parker, a photographer working above Bedson's smallpox laboratory. She had been admitted to an infectious diseases ward at the East Birmingham Hospital with an initial diagnosis of flu and drug eruption. Bedson recognised the brick-shape smallpox virus on electron microscopy.

Bedson attended the meeting at Birmingham area Health Authority's headquarters on 26 August, along with Geddes, S. S. Bakhkshi, the medical officer of environmental health, William Nicol, the Chair, and Spence Galbraith, representing the Public Health Laboratory Service. The day after confirming the specific strain of smallpox, while in quarantine at his home in Cockthorpe Close, Harborne, he committed suicide by cutting his throat and died five days later on Wednesday 6 September. His suicide note read:

I am sorry to have misplaced the trust which so many of my friends and colleagues have placed in me and my work.

In Bedson's Munk's Roll biography published by the Royal College of Physicians, virologist Peter Wildy and Sir Gordon Wolstenholme wrote:

Journalists launched a relentless effort to fix the blame on him and his staff for a breach of technique, and union officials stirred up public fears by confusing the issues with those then arising from genetic manipulation. Harassed as the chosen ‘villain’ of the tragedy, Henry Bedson’s normally stable personality broke down and he took his own life. It could be said that he was a victim of his own dedicated conscientiousness, and of his extreme sense of responsibility.

The verdict in court was that Bedson was "not guilty". How Parker exactly became infected with smallpox remains unknown.

== Personal and family ==
In 1961, Bedson married Ann Patricia (née Ducker; died 31 January 2019, aged 81), a Yorkshire staff nurse working in Liverpool. They had a son and two daughters: Peter, Ruth and Sarah Elizabeth. He was a close friend of virologist Keith Dumbell, and a godparent to his children.

Bedson's hobbies included cricket, and dry fly fishing, an activity learnt from his childhood days with his father. He owned a holiday home in Llangynog, Wales.

== Selected publications ==
- Bedson, H. S.; Dumbell, K. R. (December 1961). "The effect of temperature on the growth of pox viruses in the chick embryo". The Journal of Hygiene. 59 (4): 457–469. doi:10.1017/s0022172400039152. ISSN 0022-1724. PMC 2134458. PMID 13866488.
- Dumbell, K. R.; Bedson, H. S. (June 1964). "The use of ceiling temperature and reactivation in the isolation of pox virus hybrids". The Journal of Hygiene. 62 (2): 133–140. doi:10.1017/s0022172400039863. ISSN 0022-1724. PMC 2134592. PMID 14171265.
