= Samuel Bedson =

English bacteriologist

Bedson in 1935.

Sir Samuel Phillips Bedson, FRS (1 December 1886 – 11 May 1969) was a British microbiologist who was professor emeritus of bacteriology at the University of London.

== Early life ==
Samuel Bedson was born in Newcastle upon Tyne, the son of Peter Phillip Bedson, a professor of chemistry at the University of Durham, and was educated at Abbotsholme School in Derbyshire. From there he went to Armstrong College, Newcastle upon Tyne, where he graduated BSc in 1907. In 1912, he was awarded MB BS degrees by the University of Durham. He then studied microbiology at the Pasteur Institute in Paris.

== Career ==
Bedson started work studying blood platelets at the Lister Institute, but when World War I started, he enlisted in the Northumberland Fusiliers, was wounded at Gallipoli and evacuated home. In 1916, he was in France serving as a pathologist for the Royal Army Medical Corps. After the war, he eventually resumed his work on platelets at the Lister Institute.

In 1924, he transferred to the study of foot-and-mouth disease and in 1926 was awarded a Freedom Fellowship to study viruses at London Hospital, which in 1929 included a study of psittacosis. The causal micro-organisms Chlamydophila psittaci of psittacosis were known, from the 1930s to the 1960s, as Bedsonia as a result of his research. In 1934, he was appointed to the Goldsmiths Company’s Chair of Bacteriology at the London Hospital Medical College, from which he retired in 1952.

He was elected a Fellow of the Royal Society in 1935 and was knighted in 1956.

== Personal life and family ==
He married Dorothea Annie, the elder daughter of Henry Hoffert, a senior inspector of schools for the Board of Education. They had three sons. His second son, Henry Bedson, was the head of the Microbiology Department at the University of Birmingham Medical School and committed suicide in 1978 following the last known recorded death from smallpox, which was linked to his laboratory.

After his retirement, Bedson ran the virus unit of the British Empire Cancer Campaign in the Bland Sutton Institute of Pathology at the Middlesex Hospital until 1962.

== Selected publications ==
- Bedson SP; Bland JOW (1932). "A morphological study of psittacosis virus, with the description of a developmental cycle". British Journal of Experimental Pathology. 13 (5): 461–465. PMC 2048359.
- Bedson S (1936). "Observations bearing on the antigenic composition of psittacosis virus". British Journal of Experimental Pathology. 17 (2): 109–121. PMC 2065101.
