= Dorothea Annie Hoffert =

British scientist

- Born: 29 January 1893; Ealing
- Died: 1969 (aged 75–76)
- Education: Manchester High School for Girls; Girton College, Cambridge
- Spouse: Sir Samuel Bedson
- Children: Peter George; Henry Samuel; Ivan Francis
- Scientific career
- Workplaces: Lister Institute

Dorothea Annie Hoffert (29 January 1893 – 1969) was a British scientist who worked on aircraft dope and later oils and fats at the Lister Institute.

The elder daughter of Henry Hoffert, a senior inspector of schools for the Board of Education, she married Sir Samuel Bedson FRS in 1926; they had three sons, the second being the virologist professor Henry Bedson.

== Early life and education ==
Dorothea Hoffert was born on 29 January 1893, in Ealing, to Hermann Henry Hoffert, a senior inspector of schools for the Board of Education, and Annie Ward. She attended Manchester High School for Girls, before gaining admission to study chemistry at Girton in 1910. In 1914, she received her Dip.Ed. from the University of Manchester, after having transferred there the previous year. Subsequently, she became junior science mistress at Bede School for Girls, Sunderland.

== Career ==
Hoffert joined the Food Investigation Board of the Department of Scientific and Industrial Research in 1916, as part of the War effort. She also worked on aircraft dope and varnishes. After the War, she sat the final exam for painters' oils, colours and varnishes and received the silver medal, following which she returned to Cambridge to study chemistry, this time with a grant.
