= Pumphandle Lecture =

Annual lecture by the John Snow Society

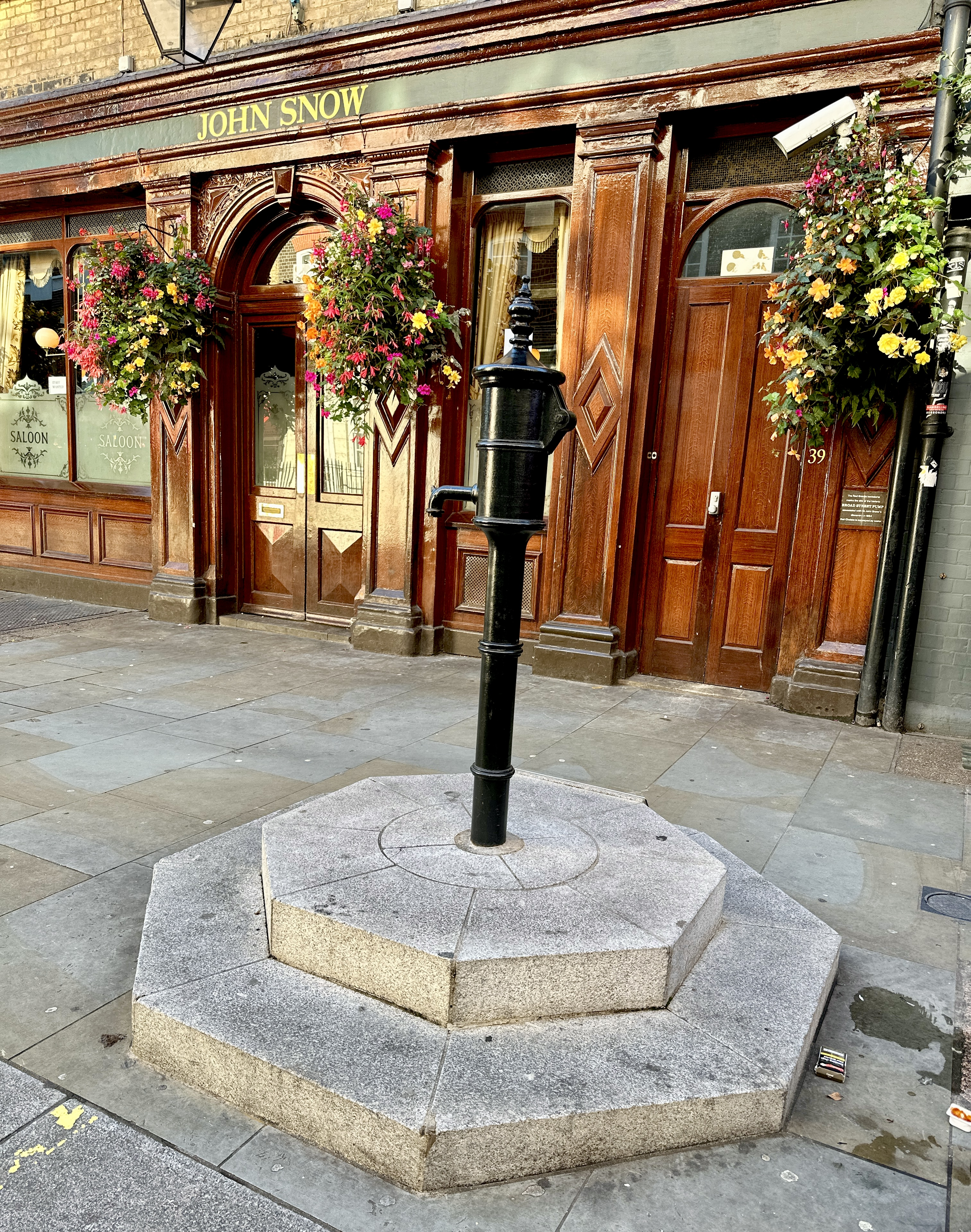
- Broad Street pump and John Snow pub
- Founder: Paul Fine
- Established: 1993
- Owner: John Snow Society
- Location: London School of Hygiene and Tropical Medicine, London, UK

The Pumphandle Lecture, established in 1993, is an annual lecture held around September to celebrate the removal of the Broad Street pump handle that took place in September 1854 during the cholera epidemic in Soho. It is organised by the John Snow Society, named for John Snow, and takes place at the London School of Hygiene and Tropical Medicine.

Following the lecture the speaker performs a ceremonial removal and replacement of the pump handle and members proceed to the John Snow pub.

== History ==
The Pumphandle Lecture was established in 1993 by the John Snow Society, named for John Snow, to celebrate the removal of the Broad Street pump handle that took place in September 1854 during the cholera epidemic in Soho. It is held every year around September.

The inaugural lecture was delivered by Nick Ward and chaired by Paul Fine.

== Lectures ==
List of speakers
Year	Image	Speaker	Nationality	Title	Notes
1993		Nick Ward	United Kingdom	"Global Polio Eradication – a call for action"	
1994		Spence Galbraith	United Kingdom	"Dr John Snow – Early Life and Later Triumphs"	
1995		Sandy Cairncross	United Kingdom	"Turning the Worm – The Guinea Worm eradication programme"	
1996		Richard Feachem	United Kingdom; United States	"Would John Snow have joined the world bank?"	
1997		Hugh Pennington	United Kingdom	"E. coli in Scotland – the relevance of John Snow and William Whewell’s consilience of induction"	
1998		Richard J. Evans	United Kingdom	"Koch, Pettenkofer and the search for the cause of cholera"	
1999		Chris Bartlett	United Kingdom	"Removing the pump handle at an international level"	
2000		John Oxford	United Kingdom	"The search for permafrost and other victims of the 1918 Influenza"	
2001		David Bradley	United Kingdom	"John Snow in the world of today"	
2002		David Salisbury	United Kingdom	"Managing vaccine adverse effects"	
2003		Mike Ryan	Ireland	"Epidemics in the 21st Century, the lesson of SARS"	
2004		Alain Moren	France	"Challenges for field epidemiology training in a widening Europe"	
2005		Tore Godal	Norway	"Everything is Impossible until it has been done"	
2006		Jamie Bartram	United Kingdom	"Drinking Water - Where Science Meets Policy"	
2007		Donald Henderson	United States	"Polio Eradication, a reconsideration of strategy"	
2008		Patrick Wall	Ireland	"Food Safety – Media based or Risk Based controls?"	
2009		David L. Heymann	United States	"When Nature turns cook – The epidemiologist’s feast"	
2010		David Nabarro	United Kingdom	"Sapiens, Synergy, Solidarite, Success"	
2011		Hans Rosling	Sweden	"Epidemiology for the Bottom Billion – where there is not even a pump handle to remove!"	
2012		Tom Frieden	United States	"What pump handles need to be removed to save the most lives in this century?	
2013		Julie Cliff	Australia	"From London to Mozambique, from cholera to konzo"	
2014		Jeremy Farrar	United Kingdom	"Medicine and public health: divorced for too long"	
2015		Atul Gawande	United States	"On removing the pumphandle: innovation and implementation"	
2016		Paul B. Spiegel	Canada	"The Syrian conflict and its effect on the future of humanitarian response: We need a new pumphandle"	
2017		Richard Horton	United Kingdom	"Life and Death in 2100: Health, History and Human Contingency"	
2018		Joanne Liu	Canada	"The Cost of Fear: Humanitarian Crises in the Age of Anxiety"	
2019		Eliza Manningham-Buller	United Kingdom	"Promoting Medical Science in an Age of Scepticism"	
2020		John Nkengasong	Cameroon; United States	"Africa CDC: A New Public Health Order"	
2021		Anthony Fauci	United States	"COVID-19: Lessons Learned and Remaining Challenges"	
2022		Andrew Haines	United Kingdom	"The imperative of climate action for health"	
2023		Ngozi Okonjo-Iweala	Nigeria; United States	"Global health equity and the role of trade"	
2024		Soumya Swaminathan	India	“Pandemics, Climate Change and the Role of Science”	
2025		Cesar Victora	Brazil	"From local insights to global impact: Four decades of child health and nutrition epidemiology in Pelotas, Brazil"	
2026		Hamid Jafari	Pakistan; United States	"From Outbreaks to Endgame, The Fight to End Polio"	
