= Tore Godal =

Norwegian physician

- Born: 19 May 1939 (age 87); Rauland Municipality, Norway
- Education: University of Oslo
- Occupation: Physician
- Organisation: GAVI
- Awards: King's Medal of Merit (2019)

Tore Godal (born 19 May 1939) is a Norwegian physician who worked with global health and vaccination, assigned with the World Health Organization, and a former leader of the GAVI.

== Career ==
Born in Rauland Municipality on 19 May 1939, Godal graduated as physician and Doctor of Medicine from the University of Oslo.

He was involved in leprosy research in Ethiopia from 1970, and was later leader of the immunization laboratory at the Radiumhospitalet in Oslo. He chaired the World Health Organization board for research on leprosy immunology from 1975 to 1980, and later had administrative roles in tuberculosis immunology and tropical diseases. He was leader of GAVI, the Global Alliance for Vaccines and Immunization, for six years from its foundation in 2000.

Godal delivered the Pumphandle Lecture in 2005, his speech titled "Everything is Impossible until it has been done". He was awarded the King's Medal of Merit in 2019. In 2026 he was awarded an honorary prize from the World Health Organization for his lifelong efforts for vaccination and global health.
