= John Snow (public house) =

Pub in London

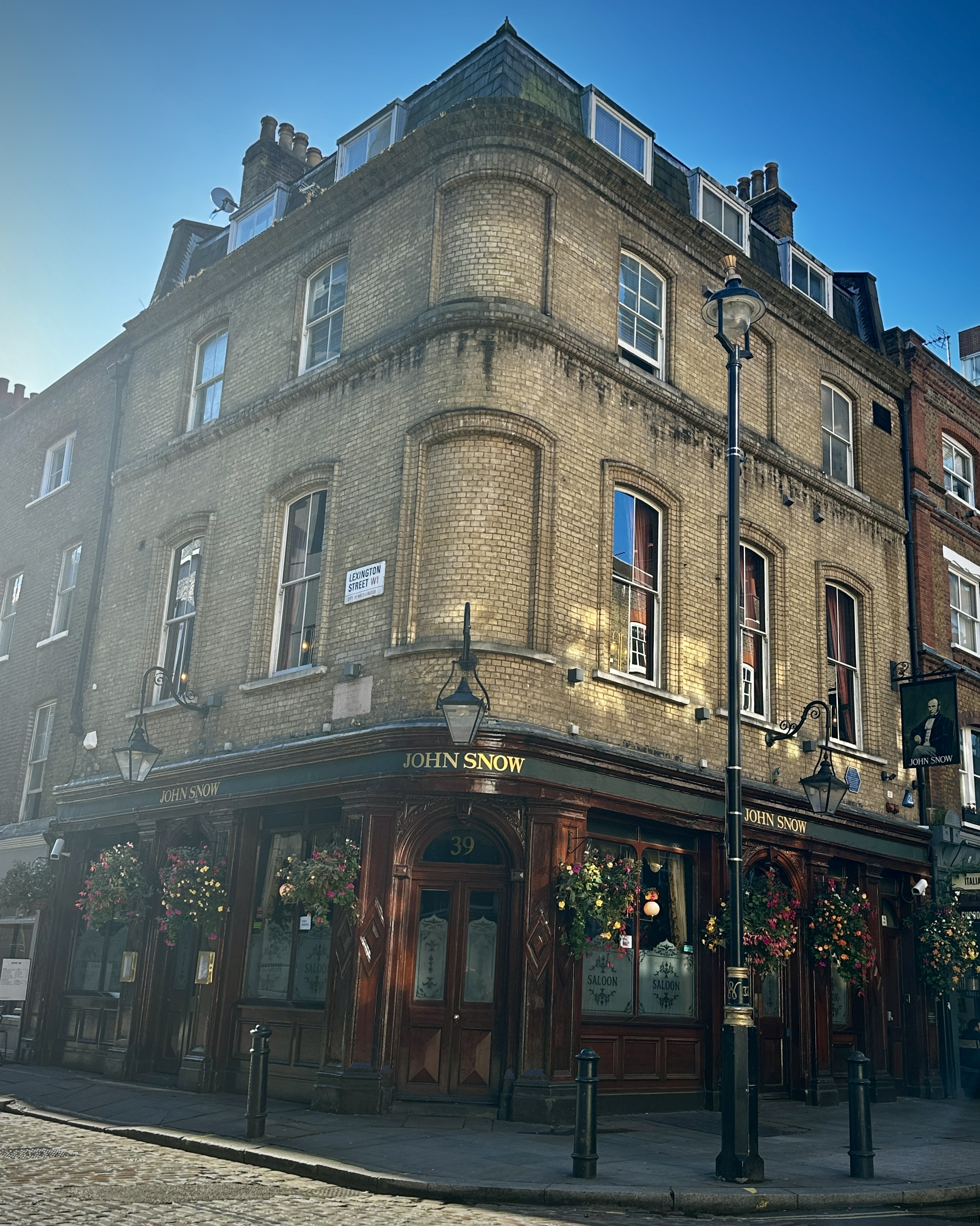
- John Snow pub (2023)

General information
- Location: Soho, City of Westminster, part of the West End of London, 39 Broadwick Street, London, United Kingdom
- Coordinates: 51°30′47.5″N 0°08′12″W
- Opened: 1870s

Design and construction
- Known for: Named for John Snow

The John Snow, formerly the Newcastle-upon-Tyne, is a public house in Broadwick Street, in the Soho district of the City of Westminster, part of the West End of London, and dates back to the 1870s. It is named for the British epidemiologist and anaesthetist John Snow, who identified the nearby water pump as the source of a cholera outbreak in 1854.

At an initial glance the pub appears like other traditional pubs. Towards the back is a staircase that leads to the first floor and a display of some of Snow's work.

The pub serves as a meeting place for the John Snow Society, which encourages its members to visit the pub, introduced a walk following the footsteps of Snow through Soho and ending at the pub, and performs a ceremonial removal of the pump handle and visit to the pub following its annual Pumphandle Lecture.

== Location ==
The John Snow, named for the British epidemiologist and anaesthetist John Snow, is located on the corner of Lexington Street (formerly Cambridge Street) and Broadwick Street (formerly Broad Street) in the Soho district of the City of Westminster, part of the West End of London.

== History ==
The building was formerly known as the 'Newcastle-upon-Tyne' and dates back to the 1870s. It was built at the site of the water pump found by John Snow to have been the origin of a local cholera outbreak in 1854. (Note: The epidemic was already on the decline by the time the handle was removed. The significance is that Snow showed that cholera spread via water and not bad smells/air.) The pub was renamed the John Snow in 1954, 100 years after the pump handle was removed. This dedication to Snow is generally thought of as peculiar as Snow was shy and never drank alcohol. The pub sign was unveiled in May 1955 by president of the Epidemiology and Public Health section of the Royal Society of Medicine, Sir Austin Bradford Hill. In 1992 a handleless replica water pump was installed nearby on the corner of Poland Street and Broadwick Street.

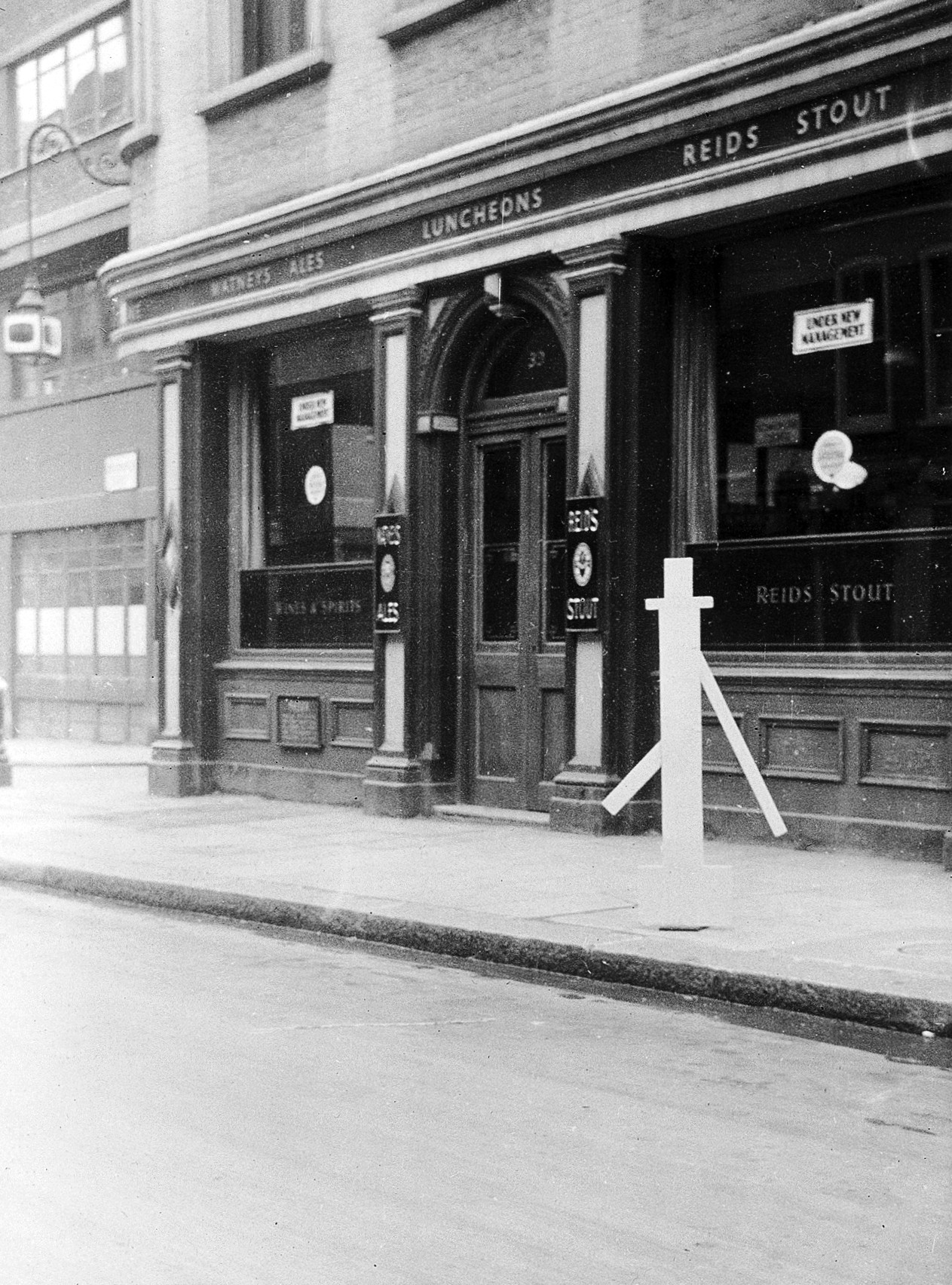
Old replica pump

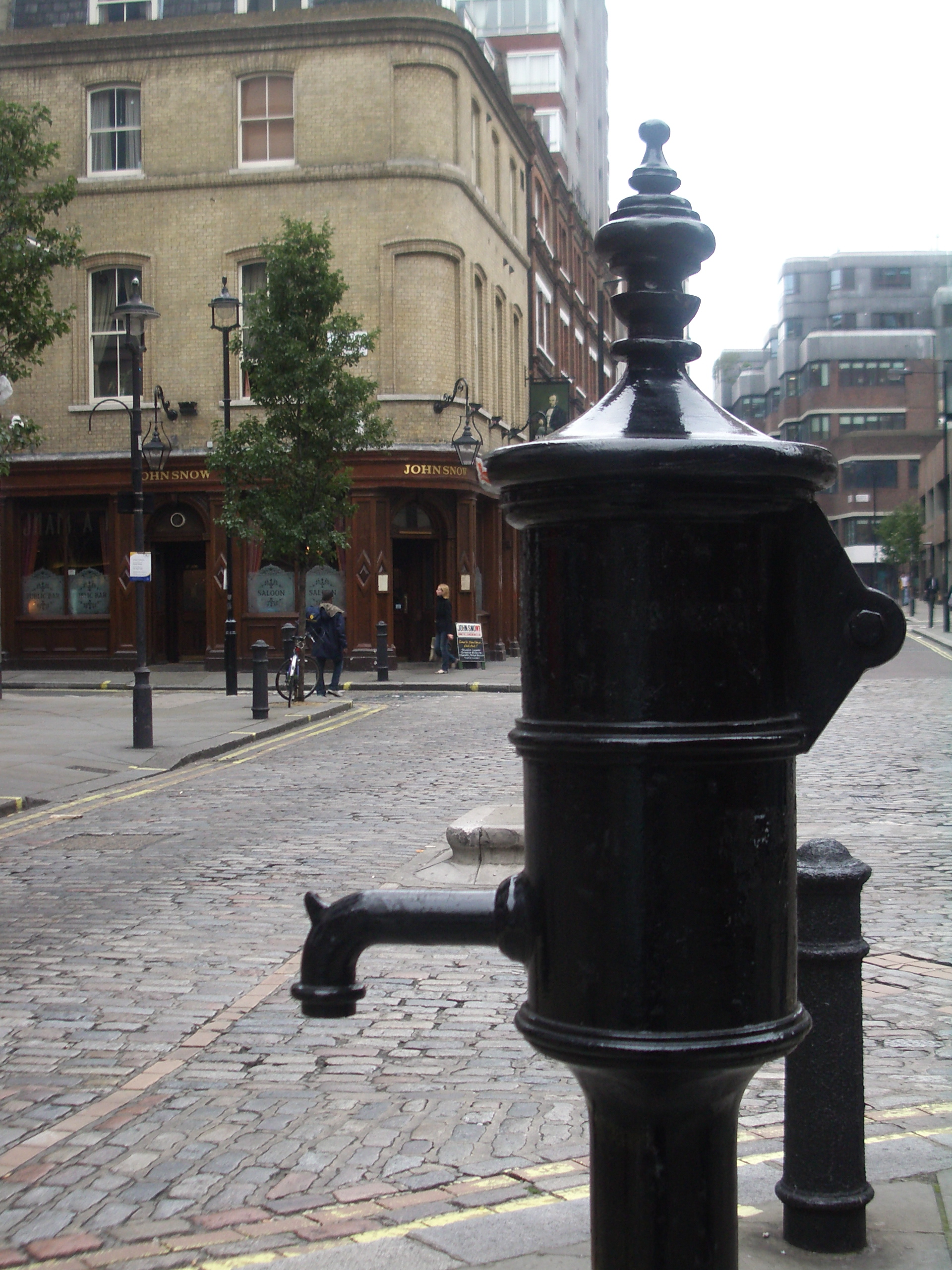
Pump erected in 1992

== Interior ==
On entering the building, it appears like other traditional pubs. Towards the back is a staircase leading to the first floor, which displays some of Snow's work and portrait.

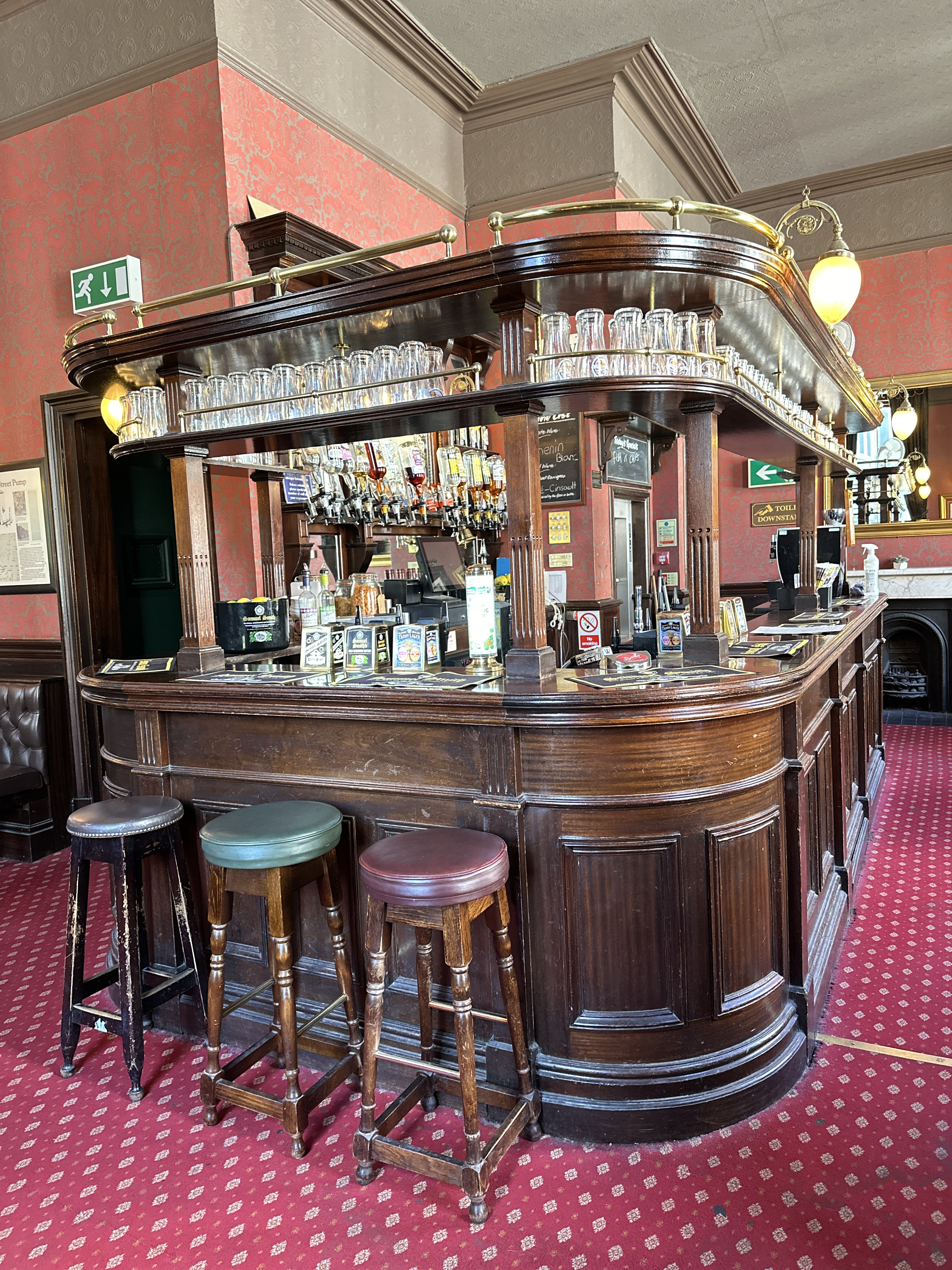
Upstairs interior

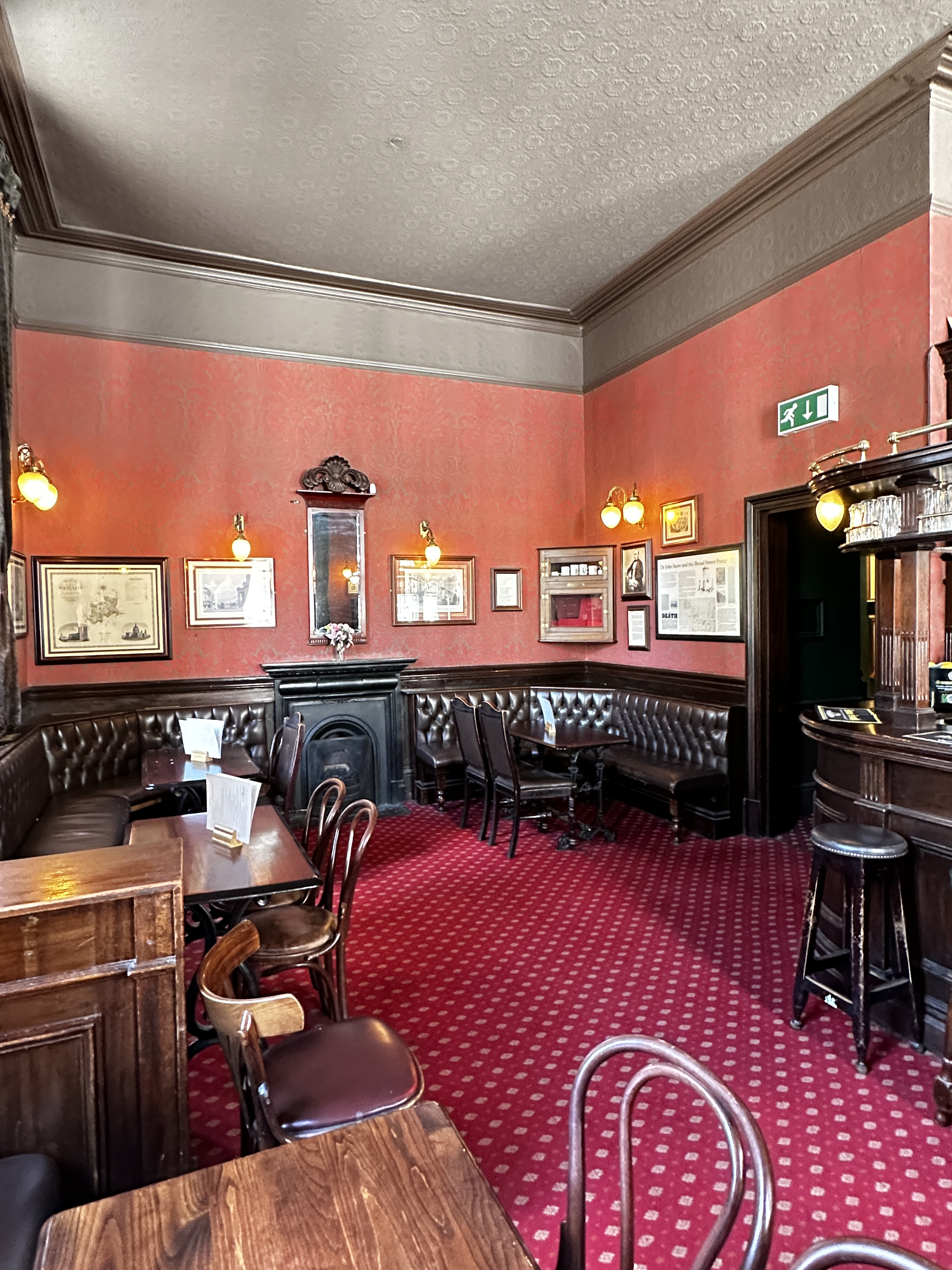
Upstairs interior

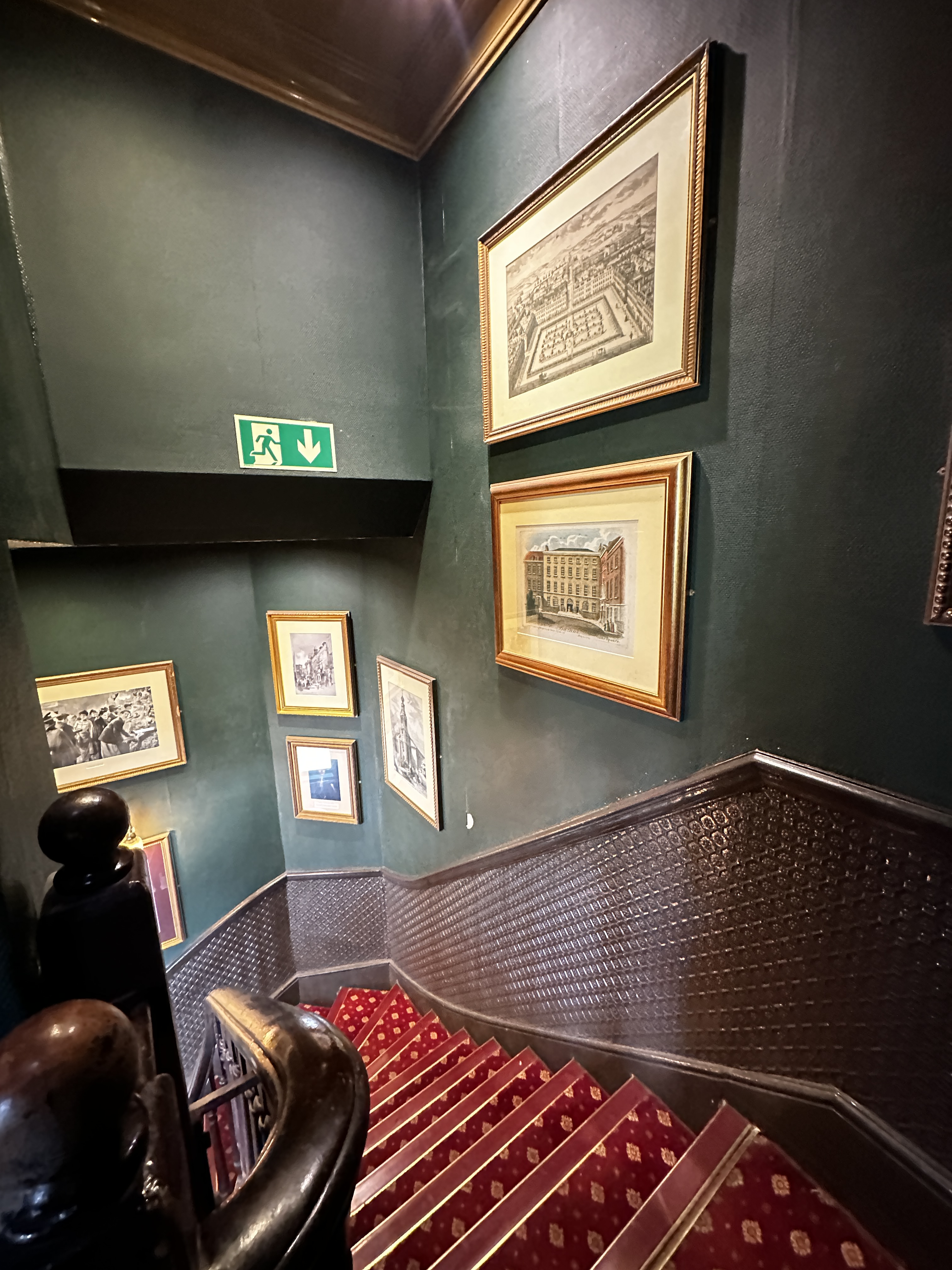
Stairs

== Exterior ==
The Royal Society of Chemistry established a blue plaque on the wall of the building. The 1992 replica pump was removed in 2015 for road restorations and replaced by another one in 2018 at the original pump location. An image of the pump was displayed on a temporary board until the replica was replaced. The pub sign outside depicts a portrait of Snow. The original site of the pump is represented by a pink curb stone outside the pub's side door.

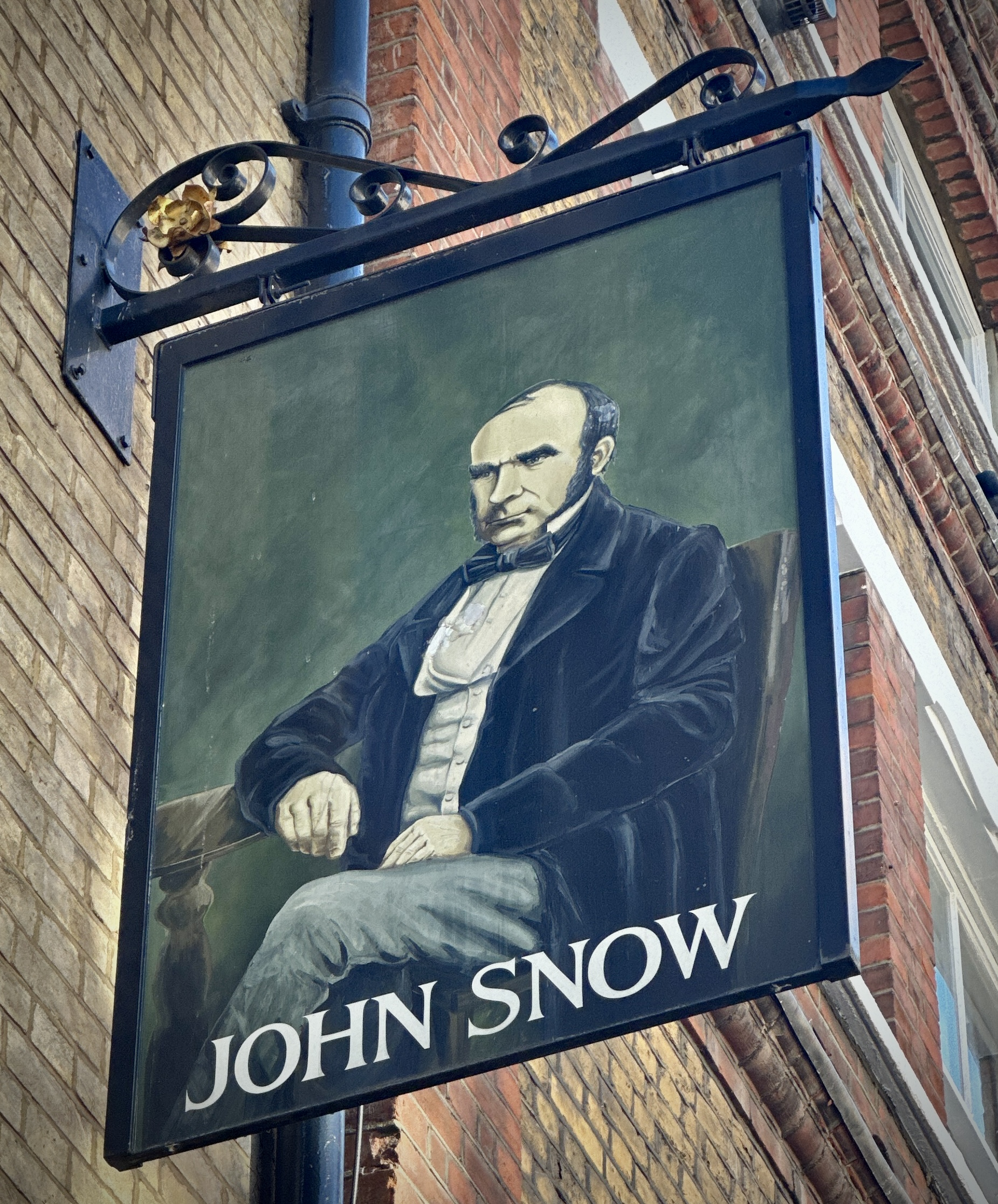
Sign outside on Broadwick Street wall

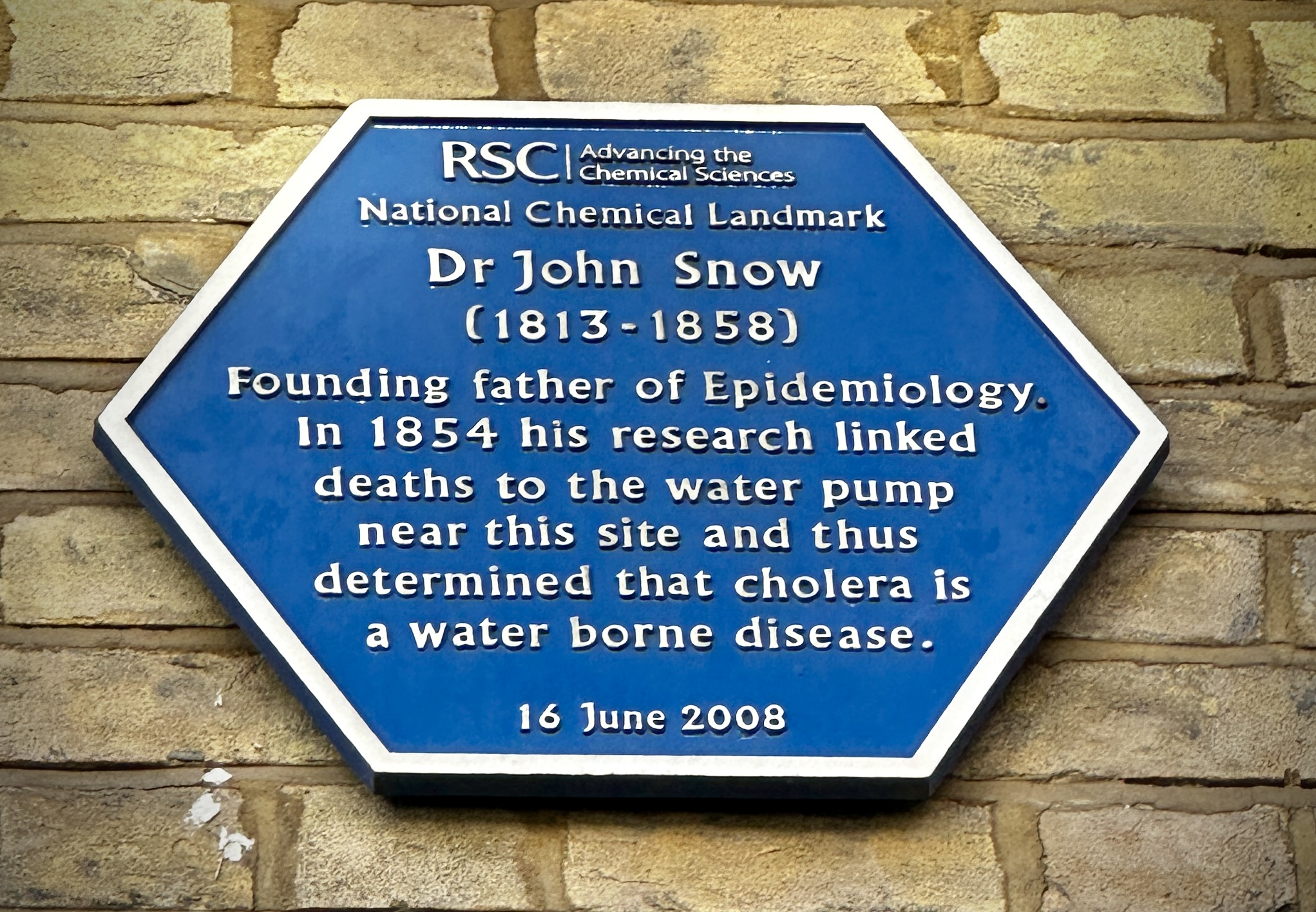
Blue plaque on Broadwick Street wall

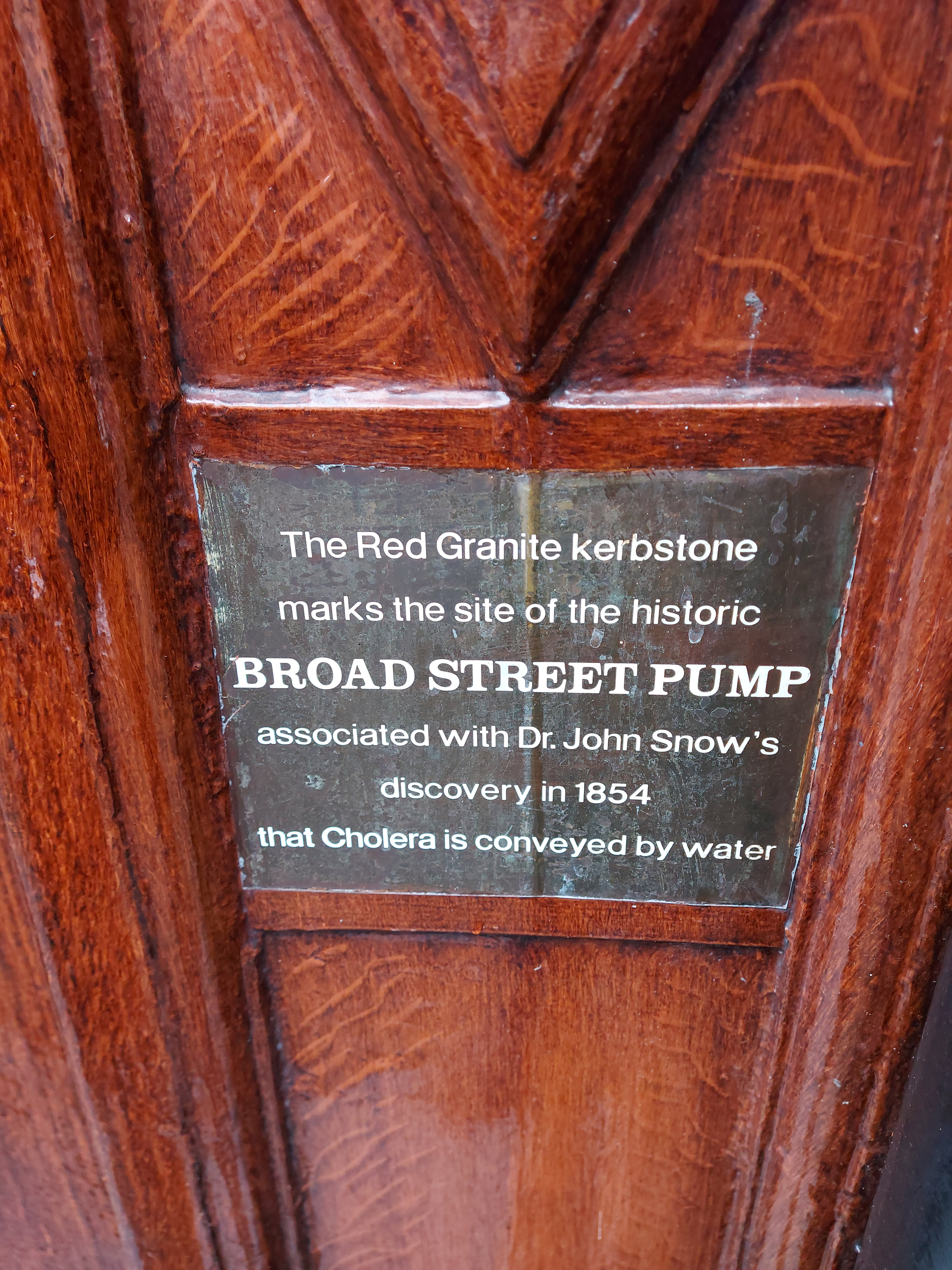
Sign on wall of pub

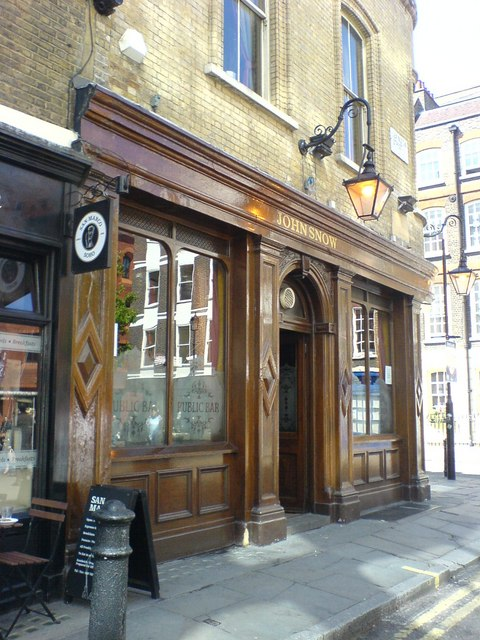
Exterior on Lexington Street

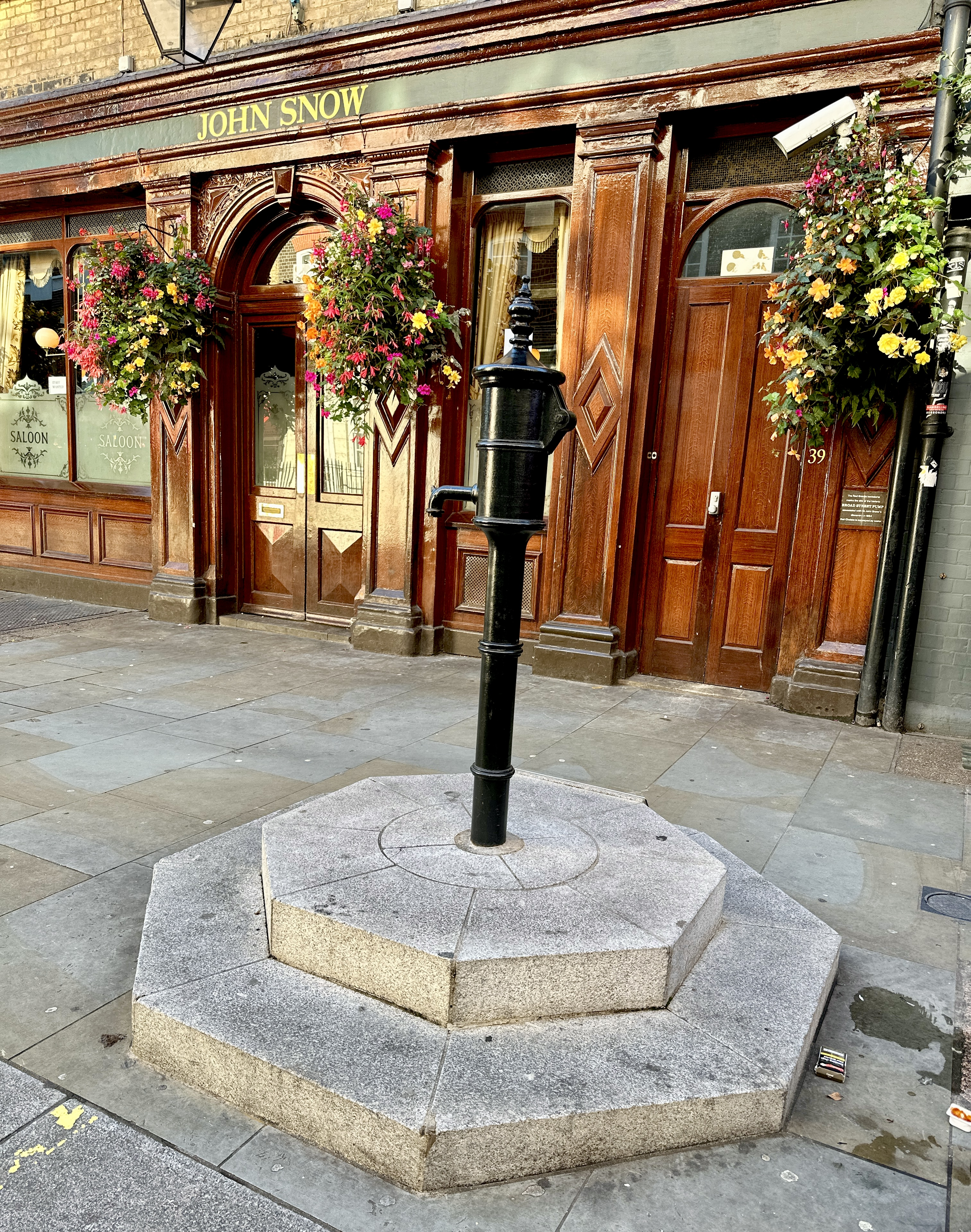
Pump erected in 2018 in front of side door

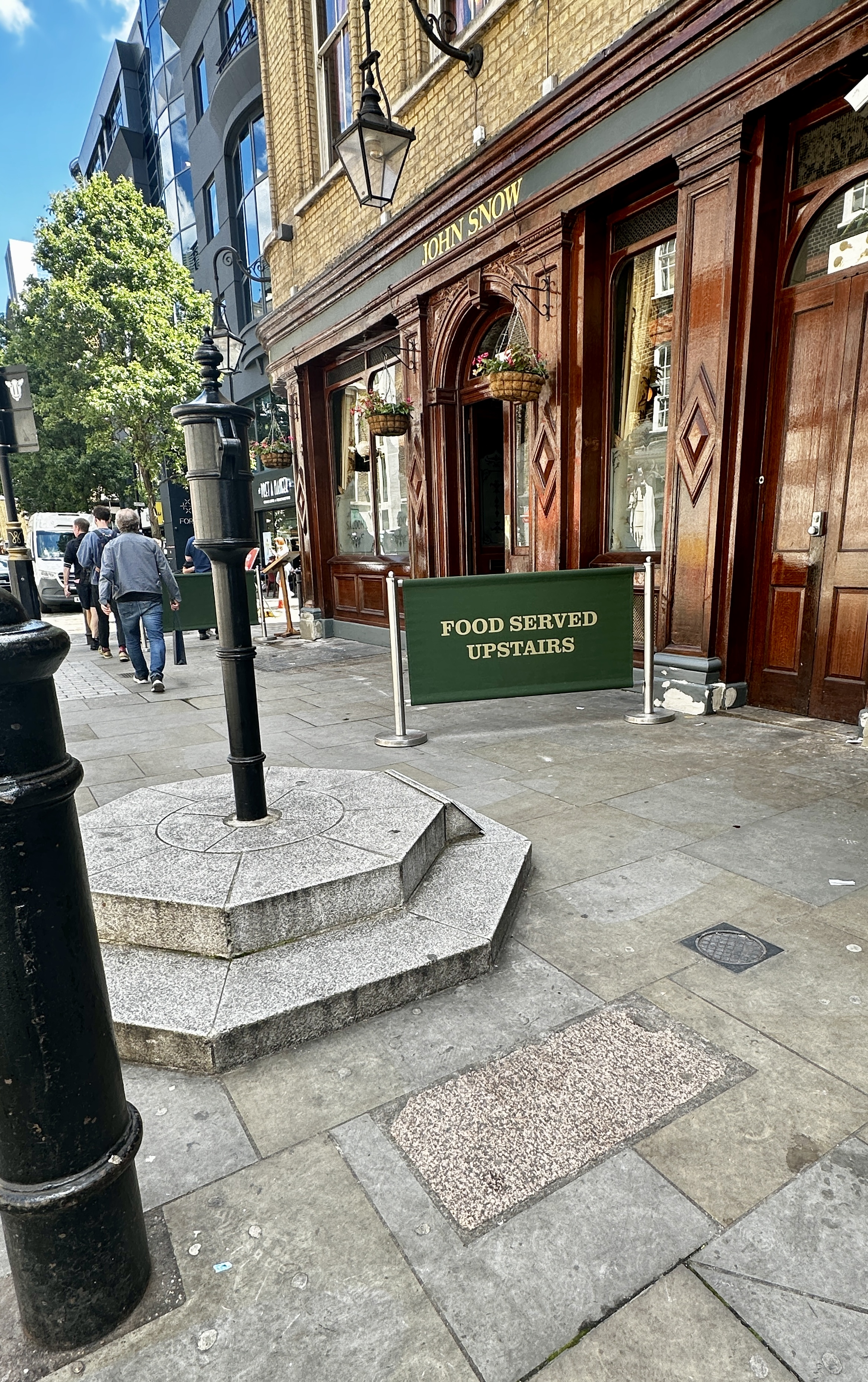
Pink kerbstone, site of original pump

== John Snow Society ==
The pub serves as a meeting place for the John Snow Society (JSS). A requirement for membership to the society is that on visiting London, at least one trip is encouraged to the pub. Following the JSS's Pumphandle Lecture, held annually at the London School of Hygiene and Tropical Medicine in September, members proceed to the pub for the society's annual general meeting. The society introduced a walk following the footsteps of Snow through Soho and ending at the pub.

== Other events ==
In 2011, a gay couple was reportedly forced to leave the location after staff members saw them kiss. In response, the local community held a "kiss-in" protest that resulted in the pub temporarily closing.
