= Medical officer of environmental health =

Former UK health officer

In the UK, the medical officer of environmental health largely replaced the duties of the medical officer of health, a statutory officer with responsibilities to the local authority in preventing disease, which was discontinued following the reorganisation of the National Health Service Act of 1973. They are the proper officer recognised by the local authority under the Public Health Acts. Ayliffe's (1981) explains that "some diseases are notifiable by law to the Medical Officer for Environmental Health; the doctor who diagnoses the infection is responsible for the notification." The medical officer of environmental health then in turn informs the Chief Medical Officer.
