= John Snow Society =

English learned society

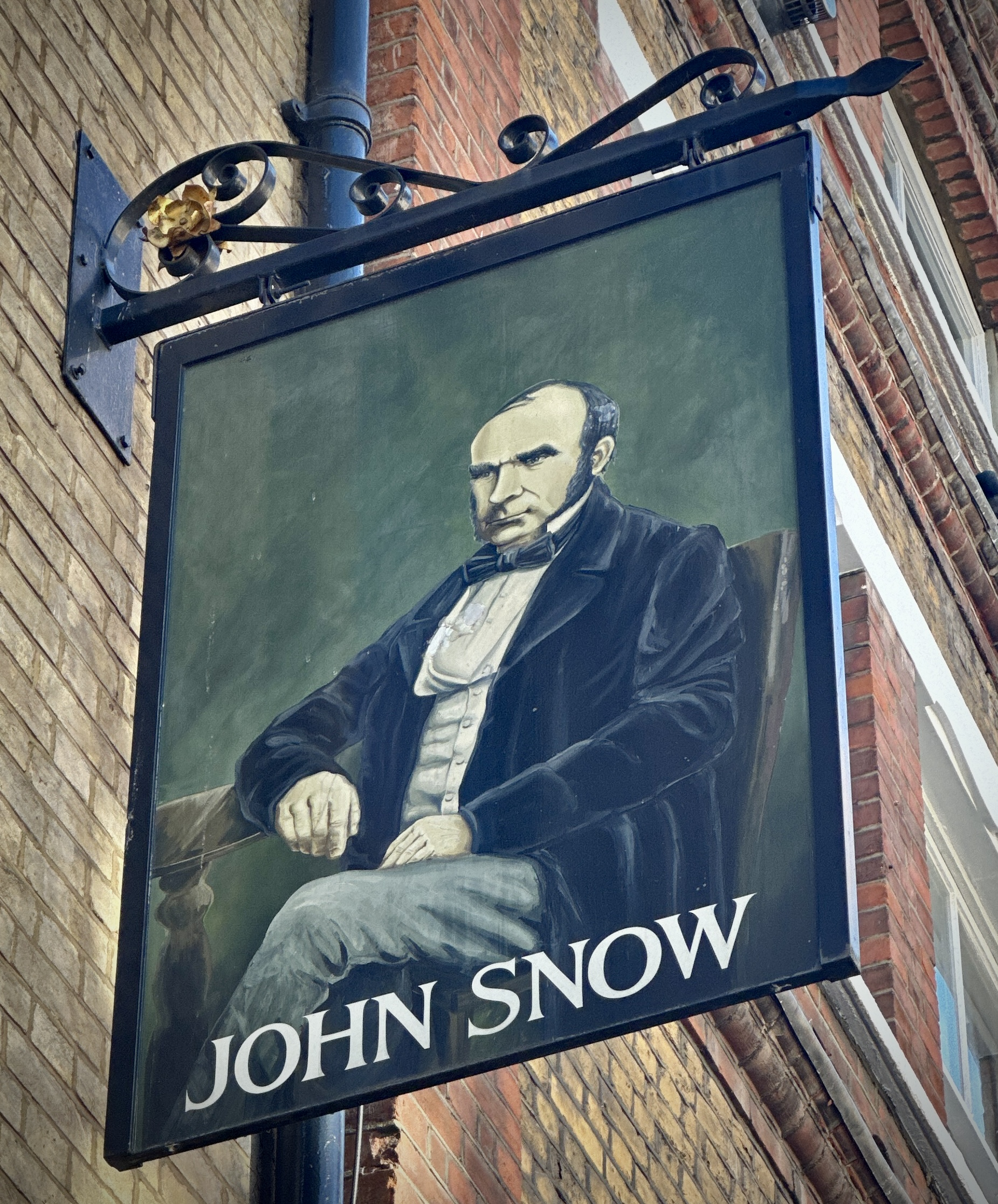
- John Snow pub (meeting place)
- Formation: 1992
- Type: Learned society
- Headquarters: London School of Hygiene and Tropical Medicine
- Location: London, UK
- Fields: Public health
- Website: Official website

The John Snow Society (JSS), founded 1992, is a learned society named for the English physician John Snow. It publishes the newsletter Broad Sheet, and hosts the Pumphandle Lecture at the London School of Hygiene and Tropical Medicine. The John Snow pub in Soho, London, serves as its meeting place.

Members are generally leading public health physicians, epidemiologists and anaesthetists. Membership requirements include a lifetime subscription, an interest in the works of Snow, and visiting the John Snow pub on at least one occasion when visiting London.

== History ==
The John Snow Society (JSS) was founded in 1992, as a learned society named for John Snow, with the support of the London School of Hygiene and Tropical Medicine and the Royal Society for Public Health. Its co-founder and first president was Paul Fine, who believes that the address book (that is, the ability to map and otherwise identify characteristics of people in relation to the local spread of disease) is key to public health and the solving of epidemics. A demonstrative pumping action handshake was introduced to greet members.

== Membership ==
Members of the JSS are typically leading public health physicians, epidemiologists, and anaesthetists. Membership requirements include a lifetime subscription fee, supporting the works of John Snow, and visiting the John Snow pub in Soho on at least one occasion when visiting London. There, they may sign the visitor book and make a toast to Snow's achievements. Members include Norman Begg, Frank J. Mahoney, Jimmy Whitworth, Sandy Cairncross, Christina Marriott, Liam Smeeth, Stefan Flasche, Sebastian Funk, James Hargreaves, Dilys Morgan, Marta Tufet, and Rosalind Stanwell-Smith.

As of 2022 lifetime membership costs £15.

== Activities ==
The JSS communicates to its members through its newsletter, the Broad Sheet.

The John Snow pub serves as a meeting place for the JSS. Its annual general meeting (AGM) is held there, typically following their Pumphandle Lecture. At the conclusion of the Pumphandle Lecture, the guest speaker ceremonially removes the pump handle. The attendees then retire to the John Snow pub, where the AGM of the Society takes place.

Members are expected to visit the pub on at least one occasion when visiting London. The minimum number of members to account for an official JSS meeting is two. The JSS possesses the original Broad Street pump. After the removal of the replica pump in 1992, the JSS petitioned for its return to its original site, achieved in 2018.

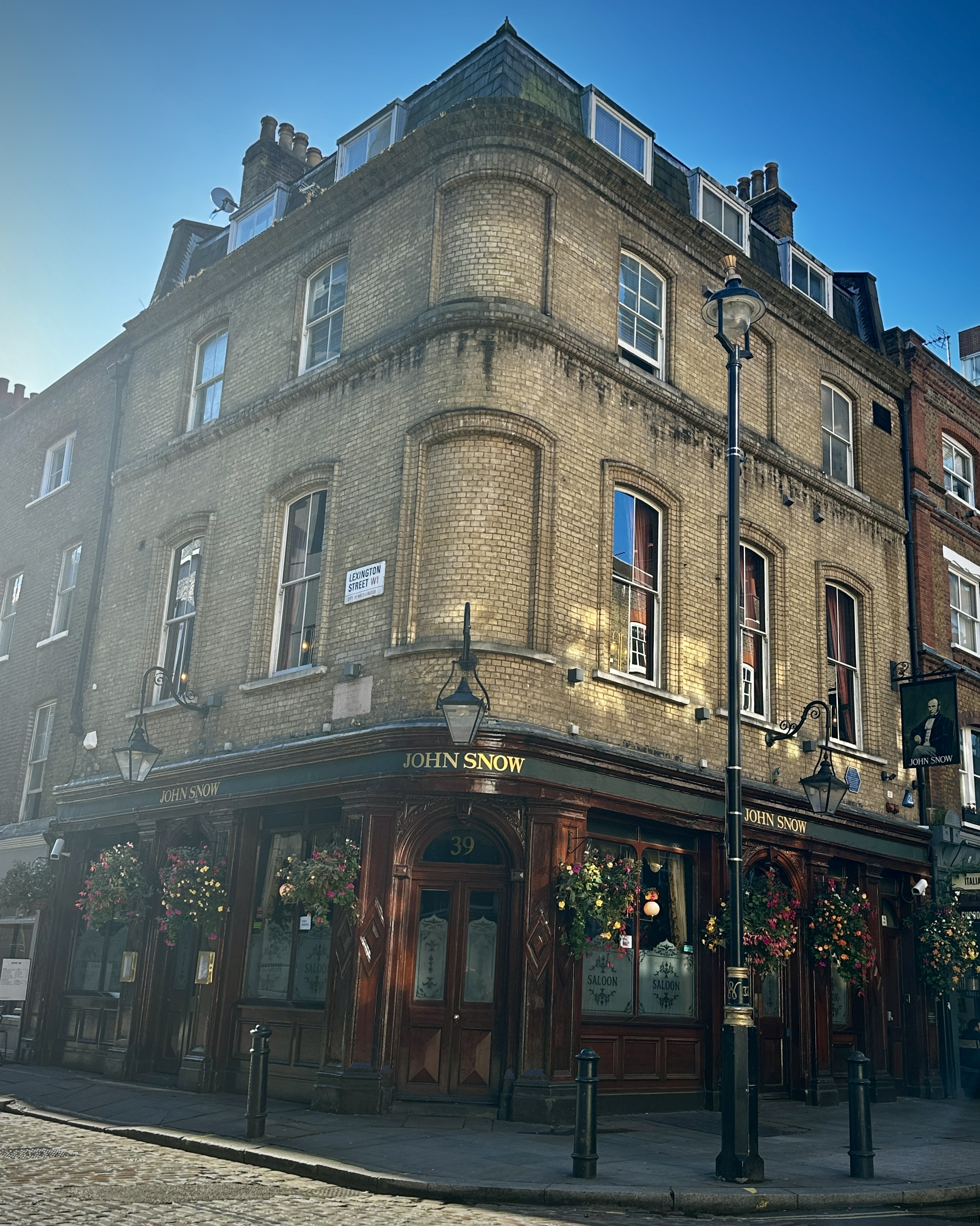
John Snow pub (meeting place)

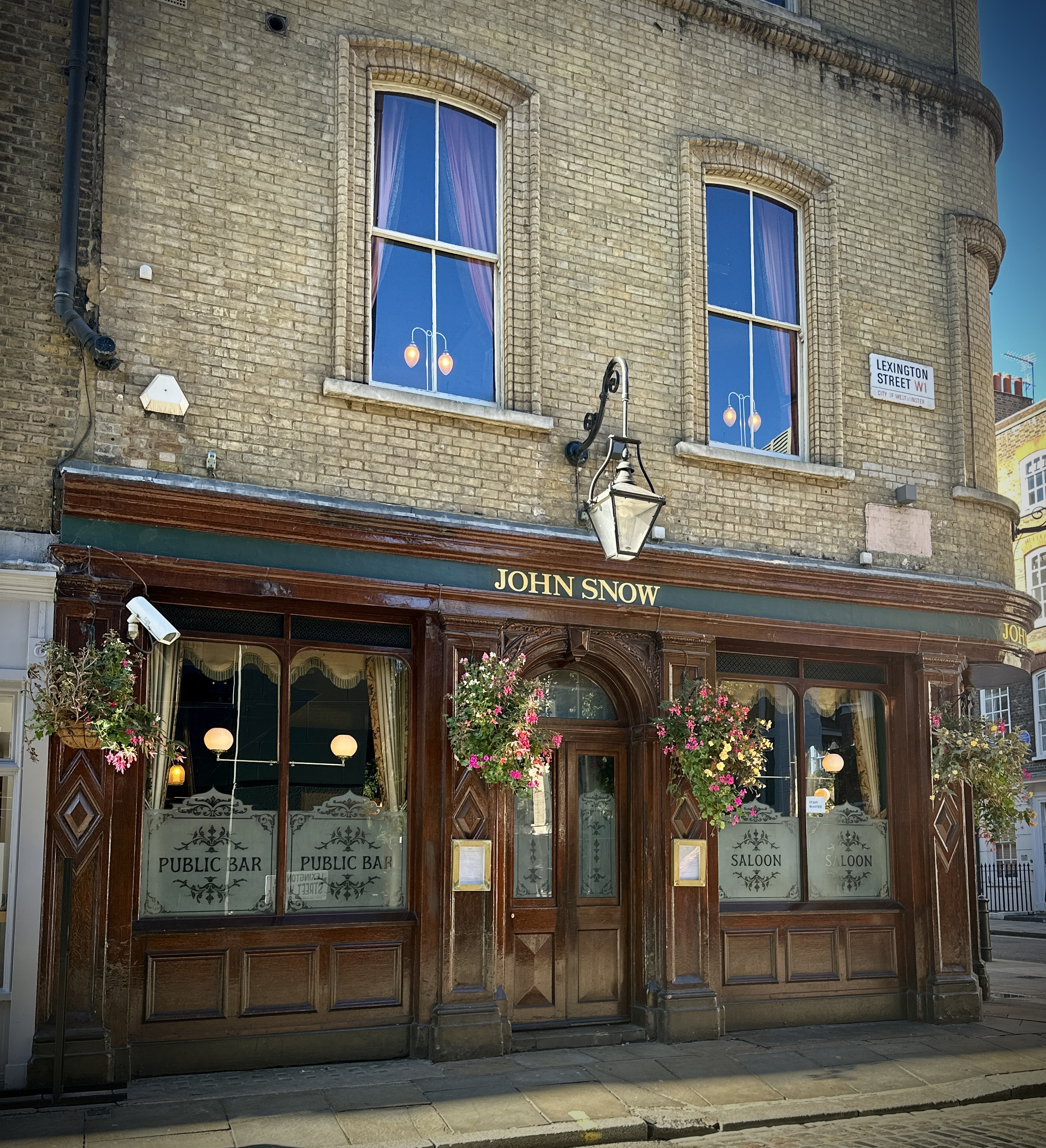
John Snow pub (meeting place)

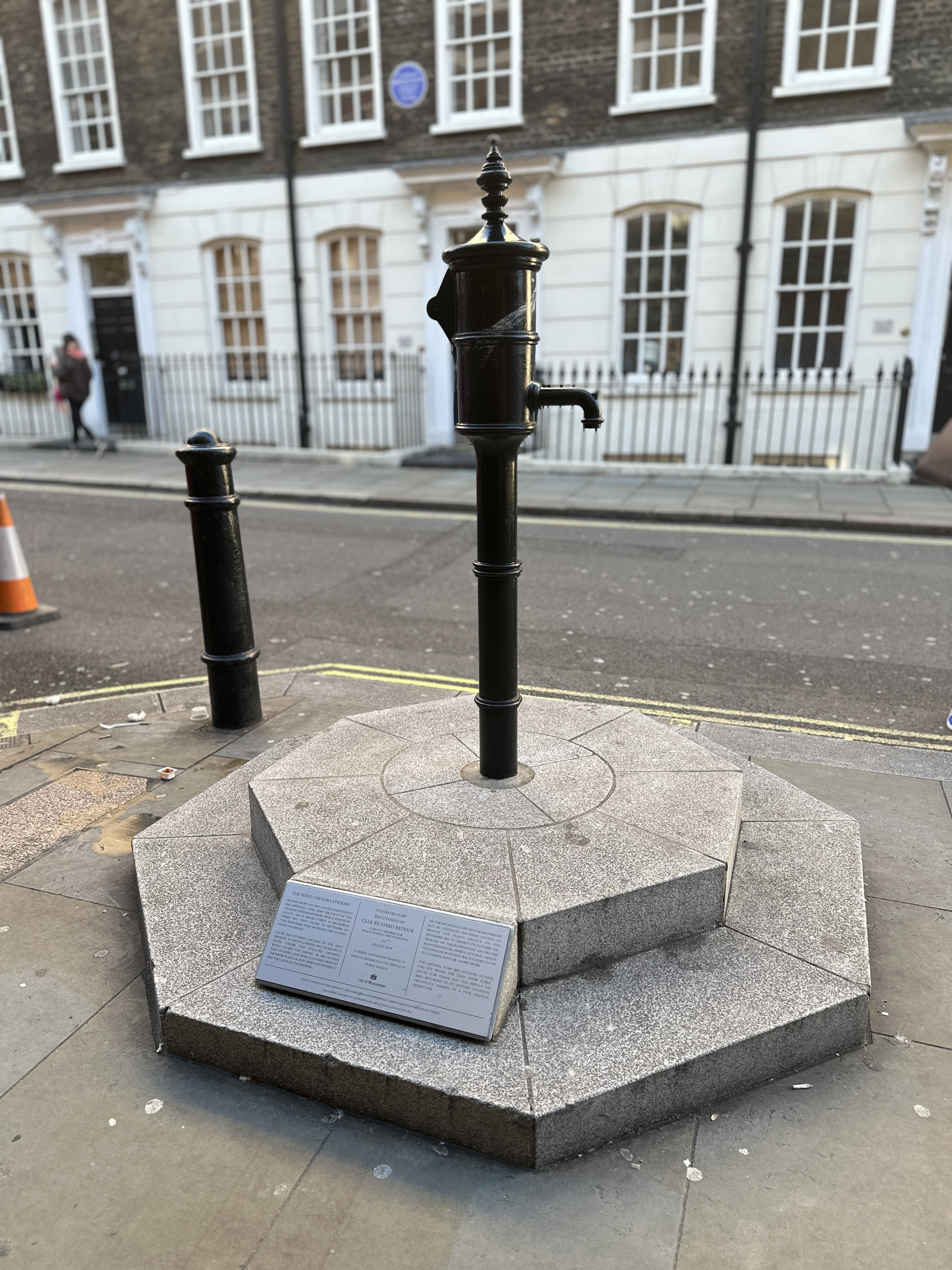
Broad Street pump replica (reinstated 2018)
