= Wolański =

Przyjaciel coat of arms

Graf von Wolański coat of arms

Wolański (Polish: [vɔˈlaɲ.ski], feminine: Wolańska) is a Polish surname derived from the populated places named Wola or Wolany. Outside Poland it may be spelled as Wolanski or Wolansky. Its Ukrainian and Russian counterpart is Volansky.

One Wolański family is associated with the Przyjaciel coat of arms related to the village of Wolany in Busko County. Some of Wolańskis, Wolański counts, were awarded the title of count in the Austrian partition of Poland (Graf von Wolański).

Notable people with the surname include:

- Agnieszka Maciąg-Wolańska (1969–2025), Polish model, writer, blogger, actress and journalist
- Erazm Wolański (1825–1886), Polish landowner, member of the Galician National Parliament and the State Council
- Filip Wolański (born 1971), Polish historian, professor at the University of Wrocław
- Janusz Wolański (born 1979), Polish footballer
- Patryk Wolański (born 1991), Polish footballer
- Piotr Wolański (1942–2023), Polish scientist, professor of technical sciences, specialist in aircraft and space propulsion systems and combustion engines
- Sabina Wolanski (1927–2011), Polish Holocaust survivor and author
- Tadeusz Wolański (1785–1865), Polish archaeologist, expert in Etruscan language
- Waldemar Wolański (born 1957), Polish stage actor and director, and playwright
- Wiktoria Wolańska (born 1993), Polish actress
