= Miasma theory =

Obsolete medical theory about the transmission of disease through bad air

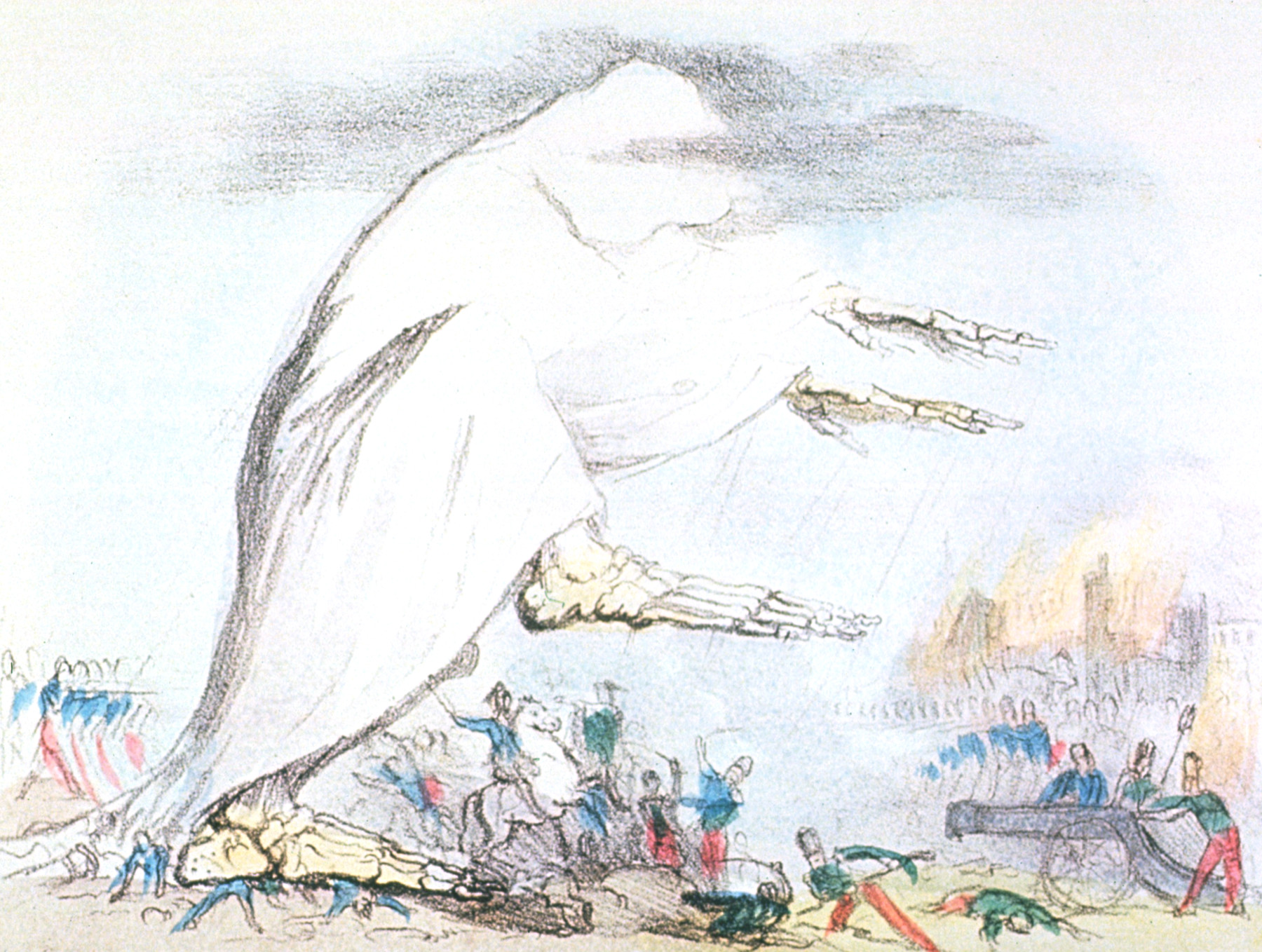
An 1831 color lithograph by Robert Seymour depicts cholera as a robed, skeletal creature emanating a deadly black cloud.

The miasma theory (also called the miasmic theory) is an abandoned medical theory that held that diseases—such as cholera, chlamydia, or plague—were caused by a miasma (μίασμα, Ancient Greek for pollution), a noxious form of "bad air", also known as night air. The theory held that epidemics were caused by miasma, emanating from rotting organic matter, the breath of humans and animals, and other odors. The theory explained why epidemics tend to happen in places with high population density, such as cities, as well as in swampy or hot and humid climates; and it addressed correlations between contagious diseases and lacking hygiene, lack of fresh air, and contacting the sick.

Though miasma theory is typically associated with the spread of contagious diseases, some academics in the early 19th century suggested that the theory extended to other conditions as well; e.g. one could become obese by inhaling the odor of food.

The miasma theory was advanced by Hippocrates in the fifth century BC and accepted from ancient times in Europe, the Middle East, and China. The theory was eventually abandoned after 1880 and replaced by the germ theory of disease: microscopic germs, such as microorganisms and viruses, caused specific diseases, and were not only spread via the air but also via fluids and touching other objects.

Miasma theory motivated improvements in urban hygiene, such as the clean-up of waste and closing of sewers, thereby in fact reducing the spread of germs. It also encouraged the construction of well-ventilated hospital facilities, schools, and other buildings. Despite germ theory, bad air quality is still a health issue, whether it is caused by industrial pollution, exhaled air, or the airborne spread of germs.

== Etymology ==
The word "miasma" comes from ancient Greek and though conceptually, no word in English has the same exact meaning, it can be loosely translated as stain or pollution. The idea later gave rise to the name malaria (literally "bad air" in Medieval Italian).

== Views worldwide ==
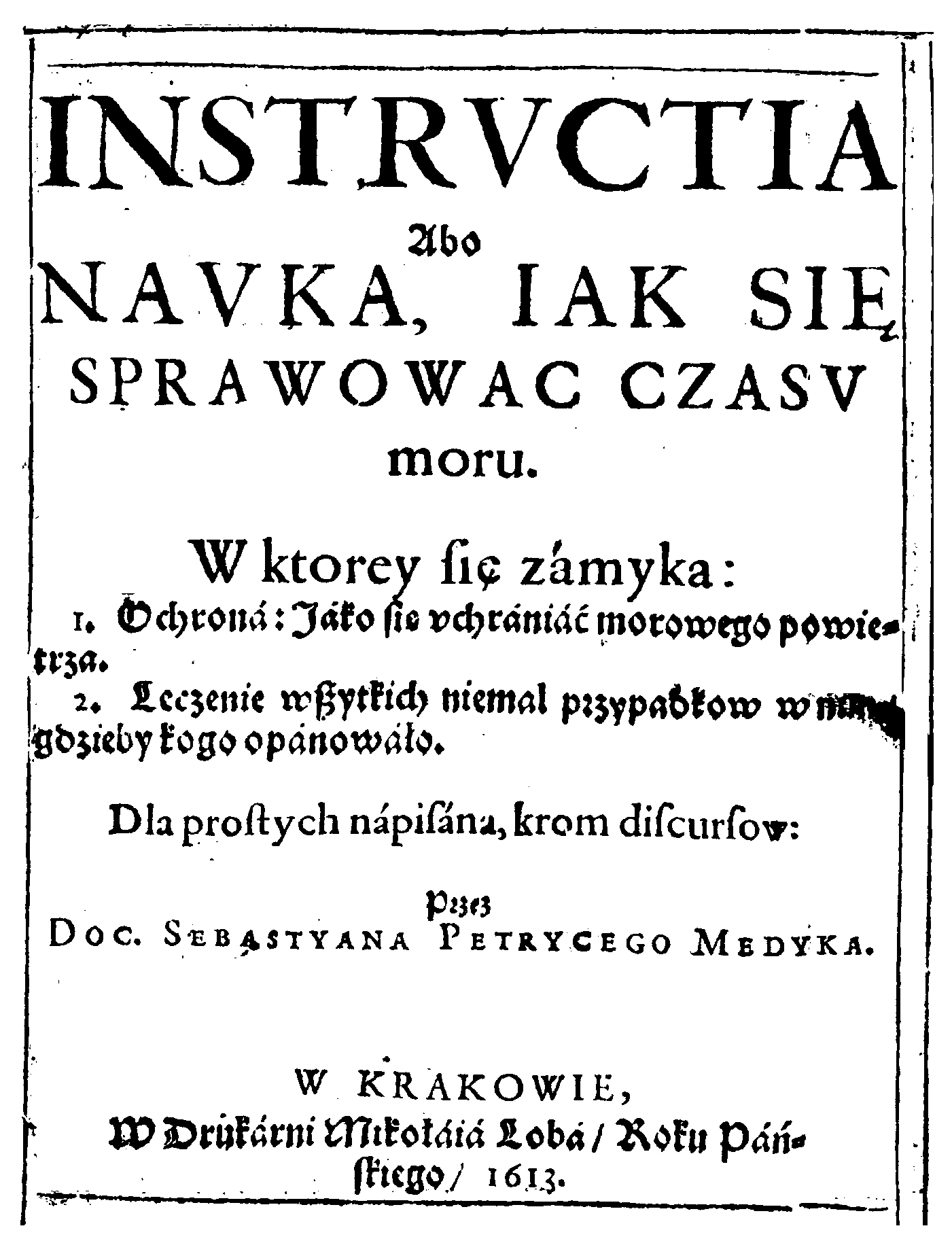
Book of Sebastian Petrycy published in Kraków in 1613 about prevention against "bad air"

Miasma was considered to be a poisonous vapor or mist filled with particles from decomposed matter (miasmata) that caused illnesses. The miasmatic position was that diseases were the product of environmental factors such as contaminated water, foul air, and poor hygienic conditions. Such infection was not passed between individuals, but would affect individuals within the locale that gave rise to such vapors. It was identifiable by its foul smell. Initially miasmas were believed to be propagated through worms from ulcers within those affected by a plague.

=== Europe ===
In the fifth century BC, Hippocrates wrote about the effects of the environs over the human diseases:

Whoever wishes to investigate medicine properly, should proceed thus: In the first place to consider the seasons of the year, and what effects each of them produces for they are not at all alike, but differ much from themselves in regard to their changes. Then the winds, the hot and the cold, especially such as are common to all countries, and then such as are peculiar to each locality. We must also consider the qualities of the waters, for as they differ from one another in taste and weight, so also do they differ much in their qualities. In the same manner, when one comes into a city to which he is a stranger, he ought to consider its situation, how it lies as to the winds and the rising of the sun; for its influence is not the same whether it lies to the north or the south, to the rising or to the setting sun. These things one ought to consider most attentively, and concerning the waters which the inhabitants use, whether they be marshy and soft, or hard, and running from elevated and rocky situations, and then if saltish and unfit for cooking; and the ground, whether it be naked and deficient in water, or wooded and well watered, and whether it lies in a hollow, confined situation, or is elevated and cold; and the mode in which the inhabitants live, and what are their pursuits, whether they are fond of drinking and eating to excess, and given to indolence, or are fond of exercise and labor, and not given to excess in eating and drinking.

In the first century BC, Roman architectural writer Vitruvius described the potential effects of miasma (Latin nebula) from fetid swamplands when visiting a city:

For when the morning breezes blow toward the town at sunrise, if they bring with them mist from marshes, and mingled with the mist, the poisonous breath of creatures of the marshes to be wafted into the bodies of the inhabitants, they will make the site unhealthy.

The miasmatic theory of disease remained popular in the Middle Ages, and a sense of effluvia contributed to Robert Boyle's Suspicions about the Hidden Realities of the Air.

In the 1850s, miasma was used to explain the spread of cholera in London and Paris, partly justifying Haussmann's later renovation of the French capital. The disease was said to be preventable by cleansing and scouring of the body and items. Dr. William Farr, the assistant commissioner for the 1851 London census, was an important supporter of the miasma theory. He believed that cholera was transmitted by air, and that a deadly concentration of miasmata existed near the River Thames' banks. Such a belief was in part accepted because of the general lack of air quality in urbanized areas. The wide acceptance of miasma theory during the cholera outbreaks overshadowed the partially correct theory brought forth by John Snow that cholera was spread through water. This slowed the response to the major outbreaks in the Soho district of London and other areas. Crimean War nurse Florence Nightingale (1820–1910) was a proponent of the theory and worked to make hospitals sanitary and fresh-smelling. Notes on Nursing for the Labouring Classes (1860) stated that Nightingale would "keep the air [the patient] breathes as pure as the external air."

Fear of miasma registered in many early 19th-century warnings concerning what was termed "unhealthy fog". The presence of fog was thought to strongly indicate the presence of miasma. The miasmas were thought to behave like smoke or mist, blown with air currents, wafted by winds, and did not simply travel on air, but changed the air through which they propagated; the atmosphere was infected by miasma, as diseased people were.

=== China ===
In China, miasma (Chinese: 瘴氣; pinyin: Zhàngqì; alternative names 瘴毒, 瘴癘) is an old concept of illness, used extensively by ancient Chinese local chronicles and works of literature. Miasma has different names in Chinese culture. Most of the explanations of miasma refer to it as a kind of sickness or poison gas.

The ancient Chinese thought that miasma was related to the environment of parts of Southern China. The miasma was thought to be caused by the heat, moisture, and dead air in the Southern Chinese mountains. They thought that insects' waste polluted the air, the fog, and the water, and the untouched forest harbored a great environment for miasma to occur.

In descriptions by ancient travelers, soldiers, or local officials (most of them are men of letters) of the phenomenon of miasma, fog, haze, dust, gas, or poison geological gassing were always mentioned. The miasma was thought to have caused a lot of diseases such as the cold, influenza, heat strokes, malaria, or dysentery. In the medical history of China, malaria had been referred to by different names in different dynasty periods. Poisoning and psittacosis were also called miasma in ancient China because they did not accurately understand the cause of disease.

In the Sui dynasty (581–618 CE), doctor Chao Yuanfang mentioned miasma in his book On Pathogen and Syndromes (諸病源候論). He thought that miasma in Southern China was similar to typhoid fever in Northern China. However, in his opinion, miasma was different from malaria and dysentery. In his book, he discussed dysentery in another chapter, and malaria in a single chapter. He also claimed that miasma caused various diseases, so he suggested that one should find apt and specific ways to resolve problems.

The concept of miasma developed in several stages. First, before the Western Jin dynasty, the concept of miasma was gradually forming; at least, in the Eastern Han dynasty, no description of miasma had been given. During the Eastern Jin, large numbers of northern people moved south, and miasma was then recognized by men of letters and nobility. After the Sui and the Tang dynasty, scholars-bureaucrats sent to be the local officials recorded and investigated miasma. As a result, the government became concerned about the severe cases and the causes of miasma by sending doctors to the areas of epidemic to research the disease and heal the patients. In the Ming dynasty and Qing dynasty, versions of local chronicles record different miasmata in different places.

Southern China was highly developed, though, in the Ming and Qing dynasties. The environment changed rapidly, and after the 19th century, western science and medical knowledge were introduced into China, and people knew how to distinguish and deal with the disease. The concept of miasma therefore faded out due to the progress of medicine in China.

==== Influence in Southern China ====
The terrifying miasma diseases in the southern regions of China made it the primary location for relegating officials and sending criminals to exile since the Qin-Han dynasty. Poet Han Yu (韓愈) of the Tang dynasty, for example, wrote to his nephew who came to see him off after his banishment to the Chao Prefecture in his poem, En Route (左遷至藍關示姪孫湘):

At dawn I sent a single warning to the throne of the Nine Steps;
At evening I was banished to Chao Yang, eight thousand leagues.
Striving on behalf of a noble dynasty to expel an ignoble government,
How should I, withered and worn, deplore my future lot?
The clouds gather on Ch'in Mountains, I cannot see my home;
The snow bars the passes of Lan, my horse cannot go forward.
But I know that you will come from afar, to fulfil your set purpose,

And lovingly gather my bones, on the banks of that plague-stricken river.

The prevalent belief and predominant fear of the southern region with its "poisonous air and gases" is evident in historical documents.

Similar topics and feelings toward the miasma-infected south are often reflected in early Chinese poetry and records. Most scholars of the time agreed that the geological environments in the south had a direct impact on the population composition and growth. Many historical records reflect that females were less prone to miasma infection, and mortality rates were much higher in the south, especially for the men. This directly influenced agriculture cultivation and the southern economy, as men were the engine of agriculture production. Zhou Qufei (周去非), a local magistrate from the Southern Song dynasty, described in his treatise Representative Answers from the South: "... The men are short and tan, while the women were plump and seldom came down with illness," and exclaimed at the populous female population in the Guangxi region.

This inherent environmental threat also prevented immigration from other regions. Hence, development in the damp and sultry south was much slower than in the north, where the dynasties' political power resided for much of early Chinese history.

=== India ===
India also had a miasma theory. Gambir was considered the first antimiasmatic application. This gambir tree is found in southern India and Sri Lanka.

== Developments from 19th century onwards ==
=== Zymotic theory ===
Based on zymotic theory, people believed vapors called miasmata (singular: miasma) rose from the soil and spread diseases. Miasmata were believed to come from rotting vegetation and foul water—especially in swamps and urban ghettos.

Many people, especially the weak or infirm, avoided breathing night air by going indoors and keeping windows and doors shut. In addition to ideas associated with zymotic theory, a general fear that cold or cool air spread disease also existed. The fear of night air gradually disappeared as understanding about disease increased, as well as with improvements in home heating and ventilation. Particularly important was the understanding that the agent spreading malaria was the mosquito (active at night) rather than miasmata.

=== Contagionism versus miasmatism ===
Prior to the late 19th century, "night air" was considered dangerous in most Western cultures. Throughout the 19th century, the medical community was divided on the explanation for disease proliferation. On one side were the contagionists, believing disease was passed through physical contact, while others believed disease was present in the air in the form of miasma, thus could proliferate without physical contact. Two members of the latter group were Dr. Thomas Southwood Smith and Florence Nightingale. Smith spent many years comparing the miasmatic theory to contagionism.

To assume the method of propagation by touch, whether by the person or of infected articles, and to overlook that by the corruption of the air, is at once to increase the real danger, from exposure to noxious effluvia, and to divert attention from the true means of remedy and prevention.

Nightingale focused on hygiene causing miasma:

The idea of "contagion", as explaining the spread of disease, appears to have been adopted at a time when, from the neglect of sanitary arrangements, epidemics attacked whole masses of people, and when men had ceased to consider that nature had any laws for her guidance. Beginning with the poets and historians, the word finally made its way into scientific nomenclature, where it has remained ever since [...] a satisfactory explanation for pestilence and an adequate excuse for non-exertion to prevent its recurrence.

The current germ theory accounts for disease proliferation by both direct and indirect physical contact.

=== Influence on sanitary engineering reforms ===
In the early 19th century, the living conditions in industrialized cities in Britain were increasingly unsanitary. The population was growing at a much faster rate than the infrastructure could support. For example, the population of Manchester doubled within a single decade, leading to overcrowding and a significant increase in waste accumulation. The miasma theory of disease made sense to the sanitary reformers of the mid-19th century. Miasmas explained why cholera and other diseases were epidemic in places where the water was stagnant and foul-smelling. A leading sanitary reformer, London's Edwin Chadwick, asserted that "all smell is disease", and maintained that a fundamental change in the structure of sanitation systems was needed to combat increasing urban mortality rates.

Chadwick saw the problem of cholera and typhoid epidemics as being directly related to urbanization, and he proposed that new, independent sewerage systems should be connected to homes. Chadwick supported his proposal with reports from the London Statistical Society, which showed dramatic increases in both morbidity and mortality rates since the beginning of urbanization in the early 19th century. Though Chadwick proposed reform on the basis of the miasma theory, his proposals did contribute to improvements in sanitation, such as preventing the reflux of noxious air from sewers back into houses by using separate drainage systems in the design of sanitation. That led, incidentally, to decreased outbreaks of cholera, thus helping to support the theory.

The miasma theory was consistent with the observation that disease was associated with poor sanitation, and hence foul odours, and that sanitary improvements reduced disease. It was inconsistent, though, with the findings arising from microbiology and bacteriology in the later 19th century, which eventually led to the adoption of the germ theory of disease, although consensus was not reached immediately. Concerns over sewer gas, which was a major component of the miasma theory developed by Galen, and brought to prominence by the "Great Stink" in London in the summer of 1858, led proponents of the theory to observe that sewers enclosed the refuse of the human bowel, which medical science had discovered could teem with typhoid, cholera, and other microbes.

The Nuisances Removal and Diseases Prevention Act 1846 was passed to identify whether the transmission of cholera was by air or by water. The act was used to encourage owners to clean their dwellings and connect them to sewers.

Though eventually disproved by the understanding of bacteria and the discovery of viruses, the miasma theory helped establish the connection between poor sanitation and disease. That encouraged cleanliness and spurred public health reforms which, in Britain, led to the Public Health Act 1848 the Public Health Act 1858, and the Local Government Act 1858. The latter of those enabled the instituting of investigations into the health and sanitary regulations of any town or place, upon the petition of residents or as a result of death rates exceeding the norm. Early medical and sanitary engineering reformers included Henry Austin, Joseph Bazalgette, Edwin Chadwick, Frank Forster, Thomas Hawksley, William Haywood, Henry Letheby, Robert Rawlinson, John Simon, John Snow and Thomas Wicksteed. Their efforts, and associated British regulatory improvements, were reported in the United States as early as 1865.

Particularly notable in 19th-century sanitation reform is the work of Joseph Bazalgette, chief engineer to London's Metropolitan Board of Works. Encouraged by the Great Stink, Parliament sanctioned Bazalgette to design and construct a comprehensive system of sewers, which intercepted London's sewage and diverted it away from its water supply. The system helped purify London's water and saved the city from epidemics. In 1866, the last of the three great British cholera epidemics took hold in a small area of Whitechapel, but the area was not yet connected to Bazalgette's system, and the confined area of the epidemic acted as testament to the efficiency of the system's design.

Years later, the influence of those sanitary reforms on Britain was described by Richard Rogers:

London was the first city to create a complex civic administration which could coordinate modern urban services, from public transport to housing, clean water to education. London's County Council was acknowledged as the most progressive metropolitan government in the world. Fifty years earlier, London had been the worst slum city of the industrialized world: over-crowded, congested, polluted and ridden with disease...

The miasma theory did contribute to containing disease in urban settlements, but did not allow the adoption of a suitable approach to the reuse of excreta in agriculture. It was a major factor in the practice of collecting human excreta from urban settlements and reusing them in the surrounding farmland. That type of resource recovery scheme was common in major cities in the 19th century before the introduction of sewer-based sanitation systems. Nowadays, the reuse of excreta, when done in a hygienic manner, is known as ecological sanitation, and is promoted as a way of "closing the loop".

Throughout the 19th century, concern about public health and sanitation, along with the influence of the miasma theory, were reasons for the advocacy of the then-controversial practice of cremation. If infectious diseases were spread by noxious gases emitted from decaying organic matter, that included decaying corpses. The public health argument for cremation faded with the eclipsing of the miasma theory of disease.

== Replacement by germ theory ==
Although the connection between germ and disease was proposed quite early, the germ theory was not generally accepted until the late 1800s. The miasmatic theory was challenged by John Snow, suggesting that some means existed by which the disease was spread via a poison or morbid material (orig: materies morbi) in the water. He suggested this before and in response to a cholera epidemic on Broad Street in central London in 1854. Because of the miasmatic theory's predominance among Italian scientists, the discovery in the same year by Filippo Pacini of the bacillus that caused the disease was completely ignored. In 1876, Robert Koch proved that the bacterium Bacillus anthracis caused anthrax, which brought a definitive end to miasma theory.

=== 1854 Broad Street cholera outbreak ===
The work of John Snow is notable for helping to make the connection between cholera and typhoid epidemics and contaminated water sources, which contributed to the eventual demise of miasma theory. During the cholera epidemic of 1854, Snow traced high mortality rates among the citizens of Soho to a water pump in Broad Street. Snow convinced the local government to remove the pump handle, which resulted in a marked decrease in cases of cholera in the area. In 1857, Snow submitted a paper to the British Medical Journal that attributed high numbers of cholera cases to water sources that were contaminated with human waste. Snow used statistical data to show that citizens who received their water from upstream sources were considerably less likely to develop cholera than those who received their water from downstream sources. Though his research supported his hypothesis that contaminated water, not foul air, was the source of cholera epidemics, a review committee concluded that Snow's findings were not significant enough to warrant change, and they were summarily dismissed. Additionally, other interests intervened in the process of reform. Many water companies and civic authorities pumped water directly from contaminated sources such as the Thames to public wells, and the idea of changing sources or implementing filtration techniques was an unattractive economic prospect. In the face of such economic interests, reform was slow to be adopted.

In 1855, John Snow made a testimony against the Amendment to the "Nuisances Removal and Diseases Prevention Act" that regularized air pollution of some industries. He claimed that:

That is possible; but I believe that the poison of the cholera is either swallowed in water, or got directly from some other person in the family, or in the room; I believe it is quite an exception for it to be conveyed in the air; though if the matter gets dry it may be wafted a short distance.

The same year, William Farr, who was then the major supporter of the miasma theory, issued a report to criticize the germ theory. Farr and the Committee wrote that:

After careful inquiry, we see no reason to adopt this belief. We do not feel it established that the water was contaminated in the manner alleged; nor is there before us any sufficient evidence to show whether inhabitants of that district, drinking from that well, suffered in proportion more than other inhabitants of the district who drank from other sources.

=== Experiments by Louis Pasteur ===
The more formal experiments on the relationship between germ and disease were conducted by Louis Pasteur between 1860 and 1864. He discovered the pathology of the puerperal fever and the pyogenic vibrio in the blood, and suggested using boric acid to kill these microorganisms before and after birth.

By 1866, eight years after the death of John Snow, William Farr publicly acknowledged that the miasma theory on the transmission of cholera was wrong, by his statistical justification on the death rate.

=== Anthrax ===
Robert Koch is widely known for his work with anthrax, discovering the causative agent of the fatal disease to be Bacillus anthracis. He published the discovery in a booklet as Die Ätiologie der Milzbrand-Krankheit, Begründet auf die Entwicklungsgeschichte des Bacillus Anthracis (The Etiology of Anthrax Disease, Based on the Developmental History of Bacillus Anthracis) in 1876 while working in Wöllstein. His publication in 1877 on the structure of anthrax bacterium marked the first photography of a bacterium. He discovered the formation of spores in anthrax bacteria, which could remain dormant under specific conditions. However, under optimal conditions, the spores were activated and caused disease. To determine this causative agent, he dry-fixed bacterial cultures onto glass slides, used dyes to stain the cultures, and observed them through a microscope. His work with anthrax is notable in that he was the first to link a specific microorganism with a specific disease, rejecting the idea of spontaneous generation and supporting the germ theory of disease.

== See also ==
- Germ theory of disease
- Germ theory denialism
- Airborne disease
- Indoor air quality
- Air pollution, an actual issue with bad air
