= Aksak coat of arms =

Polish coat of arms

Aksak
- Alternative names: Akszak, Axak, Kara, Obrona
- Earliest mention: 14th century
- Families: 20 names Aksak, Akszak, Assanowicz, Białocki, Downarowicz, Erbejder, Erbreiter, Grużewicz, Hurko, Janczura, Kardasewicz, Kardaszewicz, Kasperowicz, Okieńczyc, Okińczyc, Seliminowicz, Selimowicz, Szaguniewicz, Szahuniewicz, Talkowski.

Aksak is a Polish coat of arms of Tatar origin. It was used by several szlachta families in the times of the Polish–Lithuanian Commonwealth.

== History ==
Kasper Okińczyc was granted with a noble title by King Jan III Sobieski in 1683, after the Battle of Vienna, together with an estate called Luzinky. He was given also the command over the garrison of the city of Mścisław (modern Mstislav, Belarus), close to the border with Muscovy

The name of the coat of arms stems from Okińczyc's personal nickname, possibly a Turkish language word aksak meaning lame. Possibly Okińczyc received a wound during the battle and started using the term as his nickname and later as a name of the symbol of his family.

== Blazon ==
The blazon exists also with a heart pierced by an arrow, with blood drops.

== Notable bearers ==
Notable bearers of this coat of arms include:

- Okińczyc family

== Gallery ==
Aksak II variation

Aksak III variation, could be also a variation of the Przyjaciel coat of arms according to Znamierowski

== See also ==
- Polish heraldry
- Heraldic family
- List of Polish nobility coats of arms

== Bibliography ==
- Tadeusz Gajl: Herbarz polski od średniowiecza do XX wieku : ponad 4500 herbów szlacheckich 37 tysięcy nazwisk 55 tysięcy rodów. L&L, 2007. ISBN 978-83-60597-10-1.
