= Wolansky =

Wolansky is a modification of the Polish surname Wolański outside Poland. Notable people with the surname include:

- Raymond Wolansky (1926–1998), an American singer
- Sebastián Wolansky (born 2003), a Chilean field hockey player
- Trey Fix-Wolansky (born 1999), Canadian professional ice hockey player

== See also ==
- Wolinski
