= Pilzno =

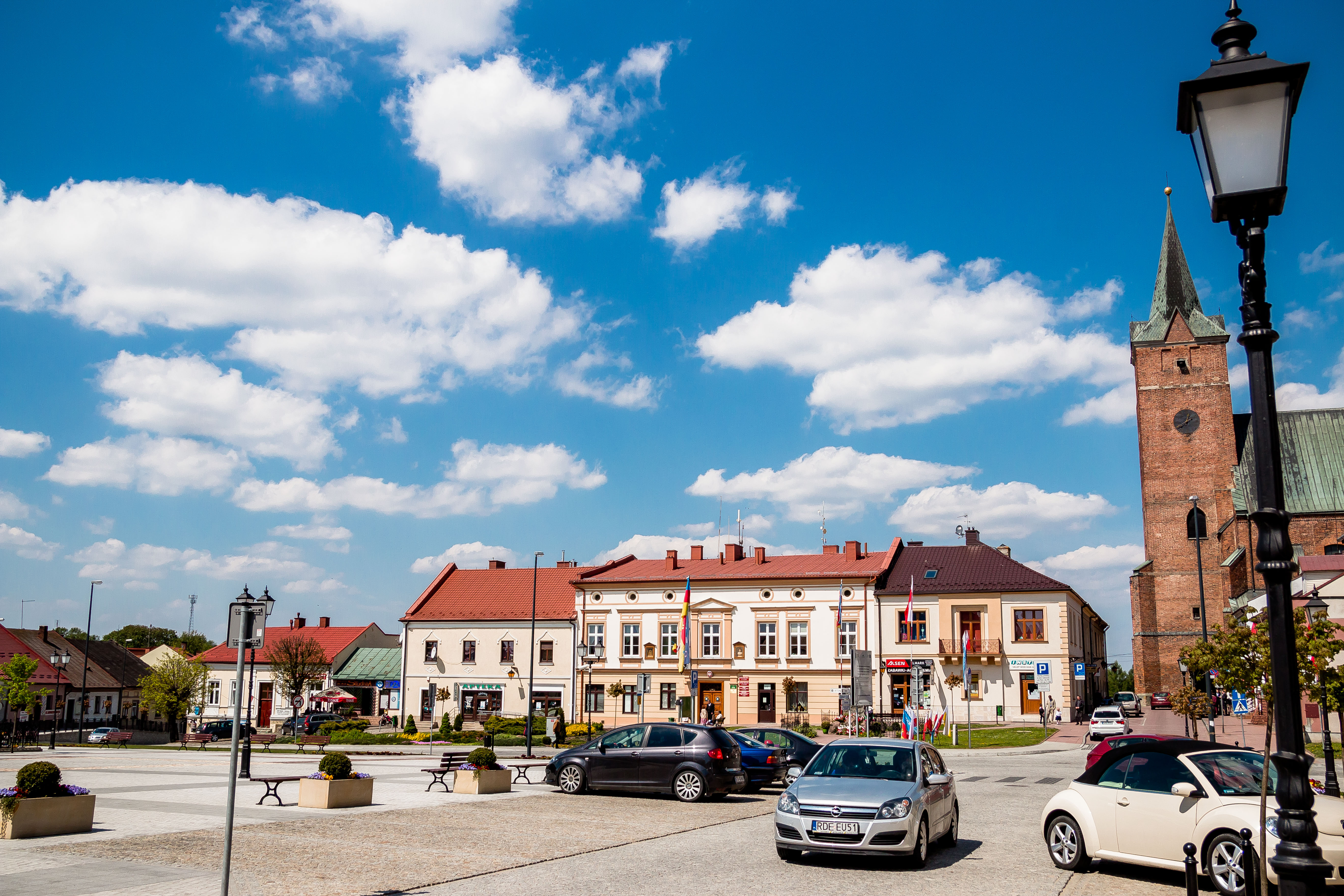
- Market Square in Pilzno

- Coat of arms

- Location within Poland
- Coordinates: 49°58′55″N 21°17′18″E
- Country: Poland
- Voivodeship: Subcarpathian
- County: Dębica
- Gmina: Pilzno

Government
  - Mayor: Tadeusz Pieczonka (Ind.)

Area
  - Total: 16.01 km^{2} (6.18 sq mi)

Population (2006)
  - Total: 4,943
  - Density: 308.7/km^{2} (799.6/sq mi)
- Time zone: UTC+1 (CET)
  - Summer (DST): UTC+2 (CEST)
- Postal code: 39–220
- Car plates: RDE
- Website: http://www.pilzno.um.gov.pl

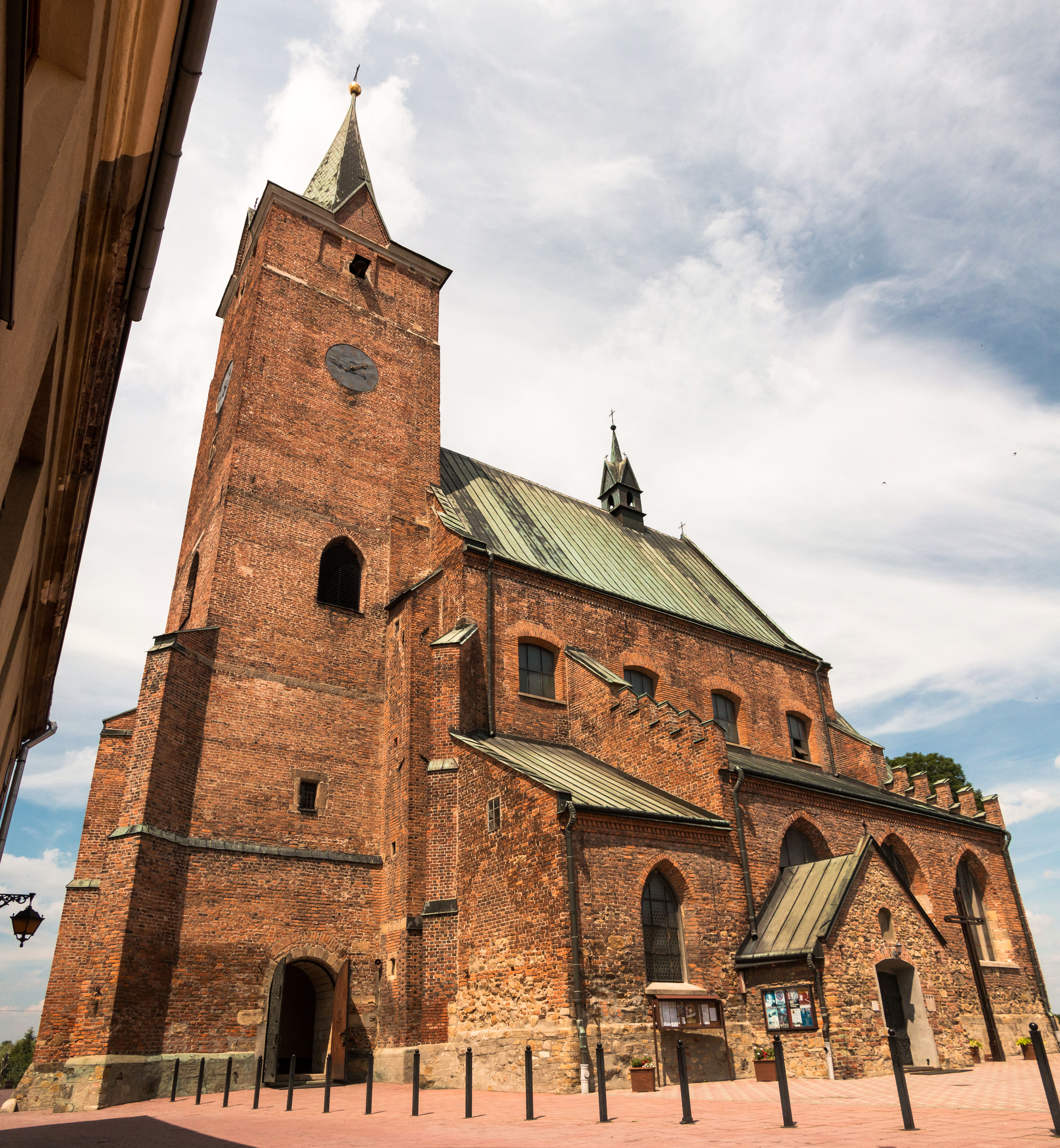
St. John the Baptist Church in Pilzno

Pilzno [ˈpʲilznɔ] is a town in Poland, in Subcarpathian Voivodeship, in Dębica County. It had 4,943 inhabitants as of 2018.

== Notable residents ==
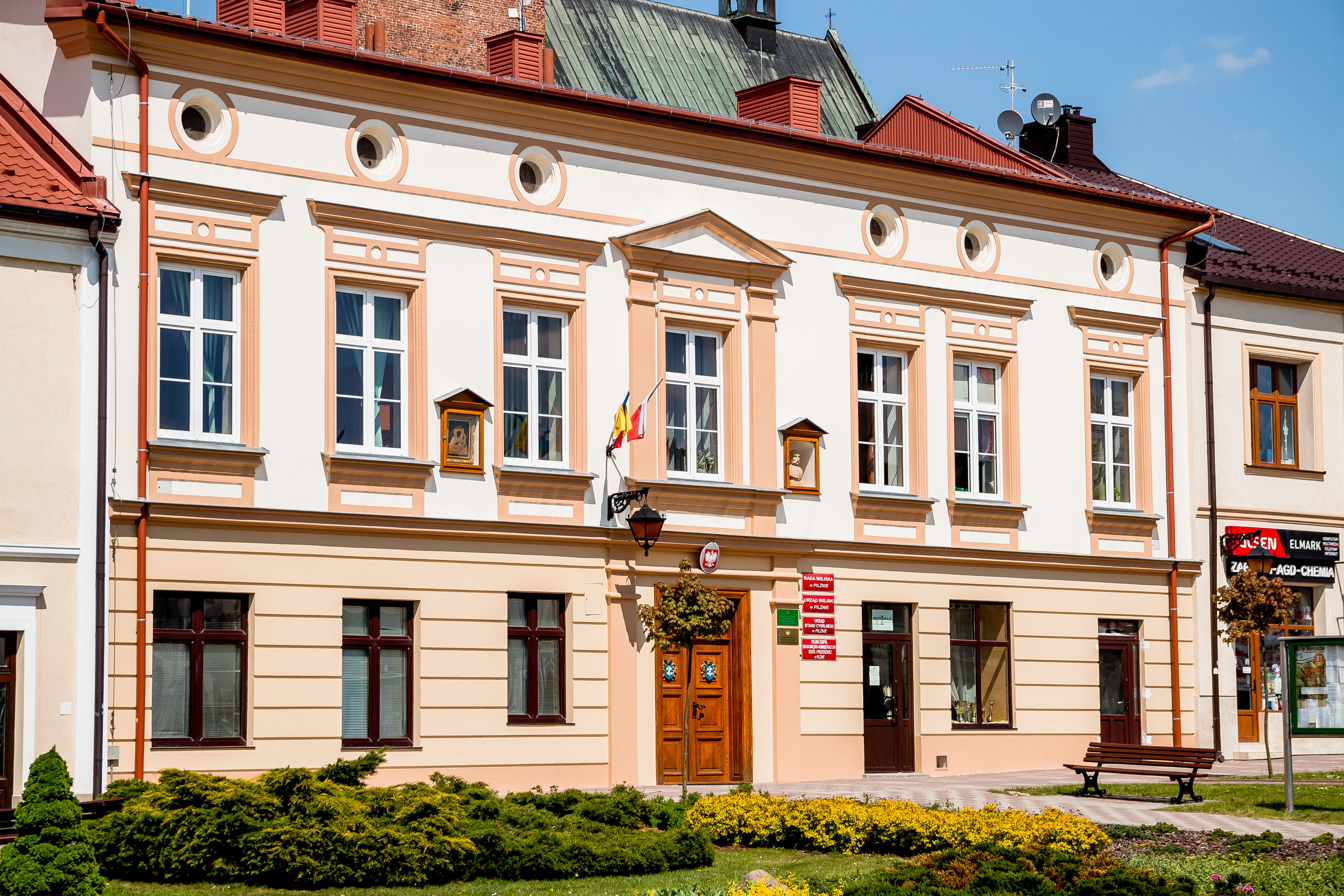
Pilzno Town Hall

- Karol Irzykowski (1873–1944), writer and literary critic
- Sebastian Petrycy (1554–1626), a Polish philosopher and physician
- Joseph Singer (1915–2006), first Pilzner Rav in the United States
- Jan "Ciężki" Tarnowski (c. 1479–1527), starost of this town
- Jan Tarło (?–1550), starost of this town
- Jan Tarło (1527–1587), starost of this town
- Janusz Wolański (born 1979), Polish midfielder

== See also ==
- Walddeutsche
- Pilzno (Hasidic dynasty)
