= Robert Boyle =

Anglo-Irish scientist (1627–1691)

The Honourable Robert Boyle FRS
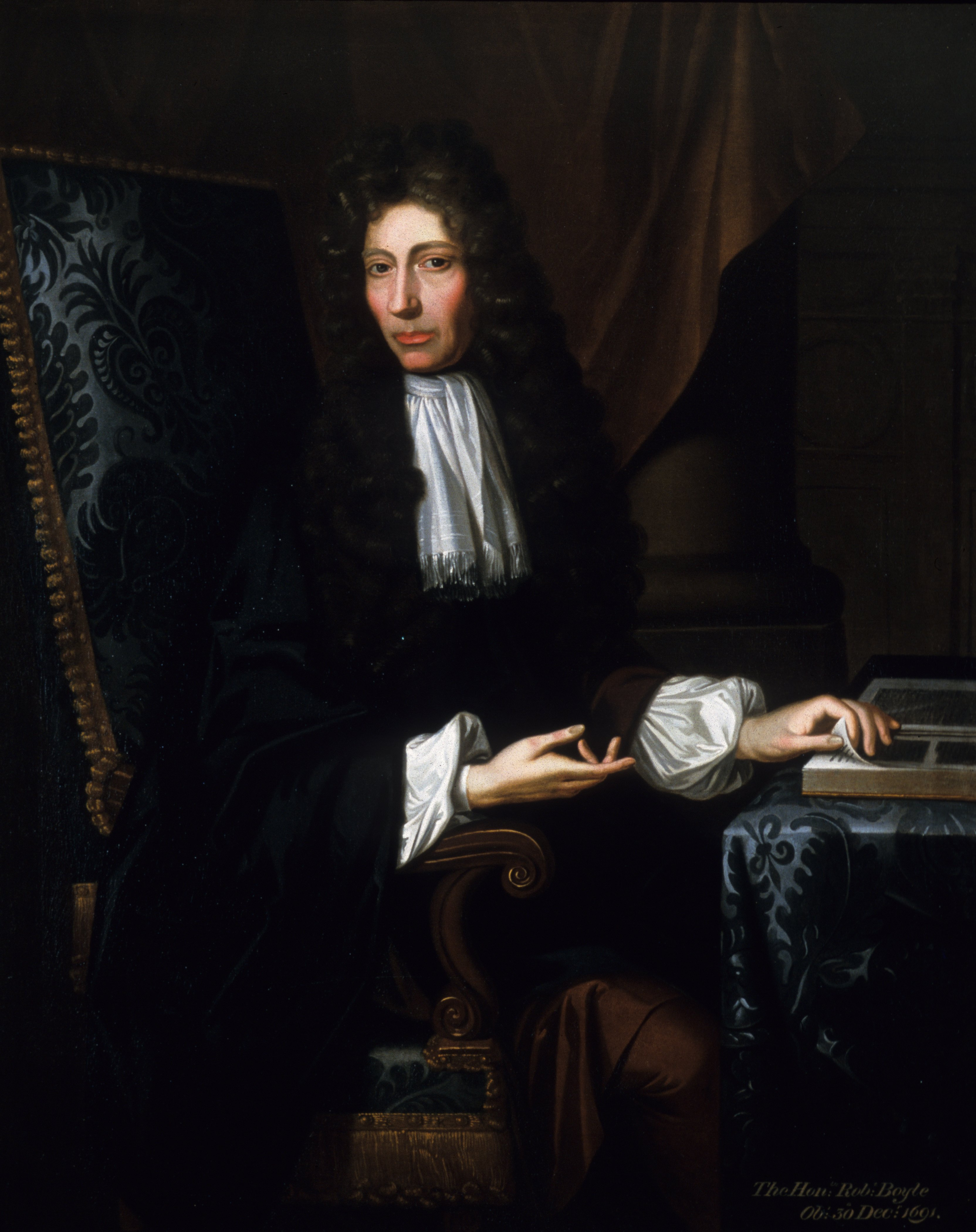
- Portrait by Johann Kerseboom, 1689
- Born: 25 January 1627; Lismore Castle, Lismore, County Waterford, Ireland
- Died: 31 December 1691 (aged 64); London, England
- Education: Eton College
- Known for: Boyle's law; Boyle temperature; Corpuscularianism; Pneumatic chemistry
- Scientific career
- Fields: Physics, chemistry
- Workplaces: Royal Society
- Notable students: Robert Hooke

Robert Boyle (/bɔɪl/; 25 January 1627 – 31 December 1691) was an Anglo-Irish chemist, alchemist, physicist, theologian, and inventor. Boyle is largely regarded today as the first modern chemist, and therefore one of the founders of modern chemistry, and one of the pioneers of modern experimental scientific method.

He is best known for Boyle's law, which describes the inversely proportional relationship between the absolute pressure and volume of a gas, if the temperature is kept constant within a closed system.

Among his works, The Sceptical Chymist is seen as a cornerstone book in the field of chemistry. He was a devout and pious Anglican and is noted for his works in theology.

== Biography ==
=== Early years ===
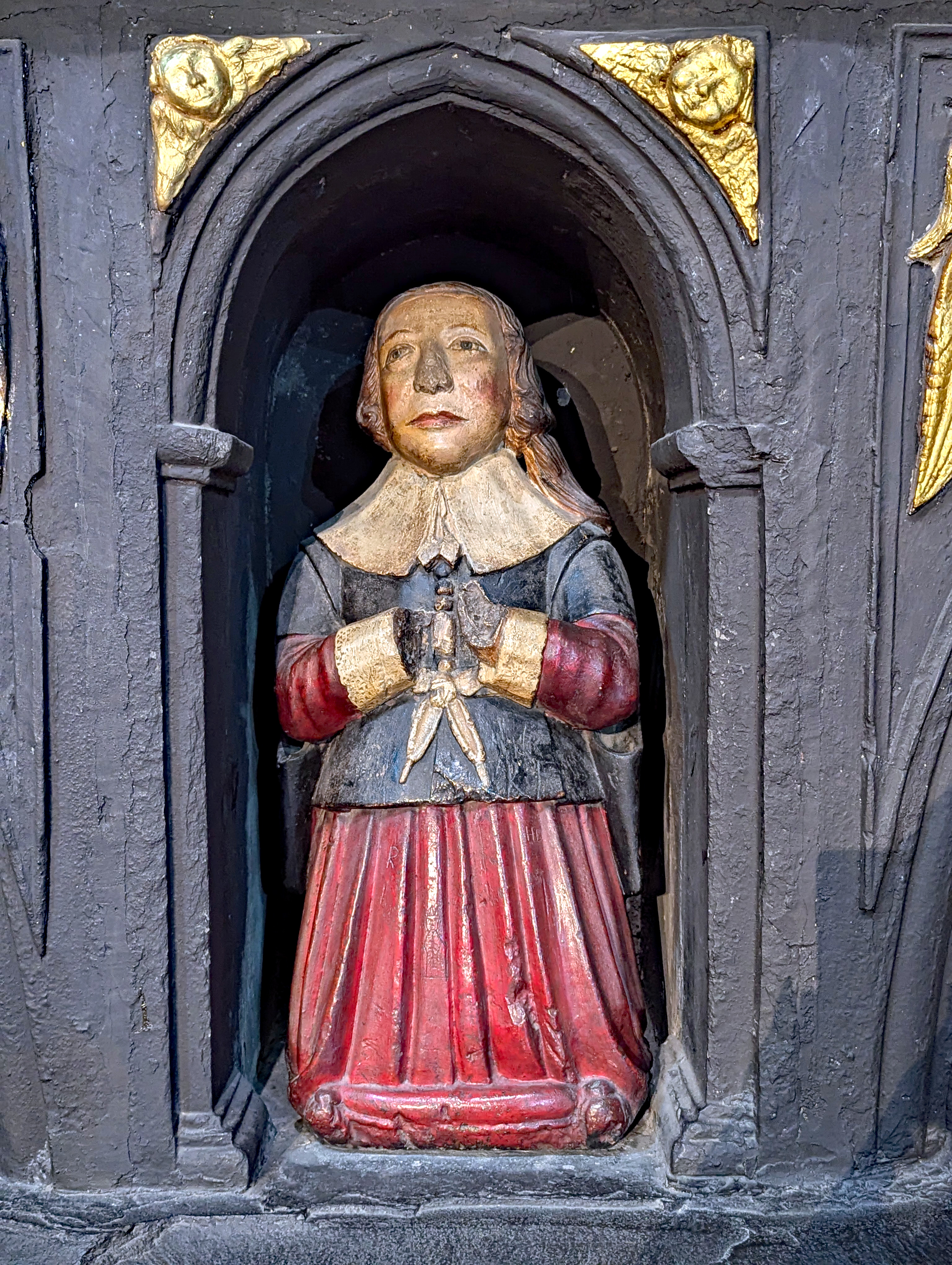
Sculpture of a young boy, thought to be Boyle, on his parents' monument in St Patrick's Cathedral, Dublin

Boyle was born at Lismore Castle in County Waterford, in the far south of Ireland, the seventh son and fourteenth child of the 1st Earl of Cork ("the Great Earl of Cork") and Catherine Fenton. Lord Cork, then known simply as Richard Boyle, had arrived in Dublin from England in 1588 during the Tudor plantations of Ireland and obtained an appointment as a deputy escheator. He had amassed enormous wealth and landholdings by the time Robert was born and had been made Earl of Cork in October 1620. Catherine, his wife, was the daughter of Sir Geoffrey Fenton, the former Secretary of State for Ireland, who was born in Dublin in 1539, and Alice Weston, the daughter of Robert Weston, who was born in Lismore in 1541.

As a child, Boyle was raised by a wet nurse, as were his elder brothers. Boyle received private tutoring in Latin, Greek, and French and when he was eight years old, following the death of his mother, he, and his brother Francis, were sent to Eton College in England. His father's friend, Sir Henry Wotton, was then the provost of the college.

During this time, his father hired a private tutor, Robert Carew, who had knowledge of Irish, to act as a private tutor to his sons in Eton. However, "only Mr. Robert sometimes desires it [Irish] and is a little entered in it", but despite the "many reasons" given by Carew to draw their attention to it, "they practise the French and Latin but they affect not the Irish". After spending over three years at Eton, Robert travelled abroad with a French tutor. They visited Italy in 1641 and remained in Florence during the winter of that year studying the "paradoxes of the great star-gazer", the elderly Galileo Galilei.

=== Middle years ===
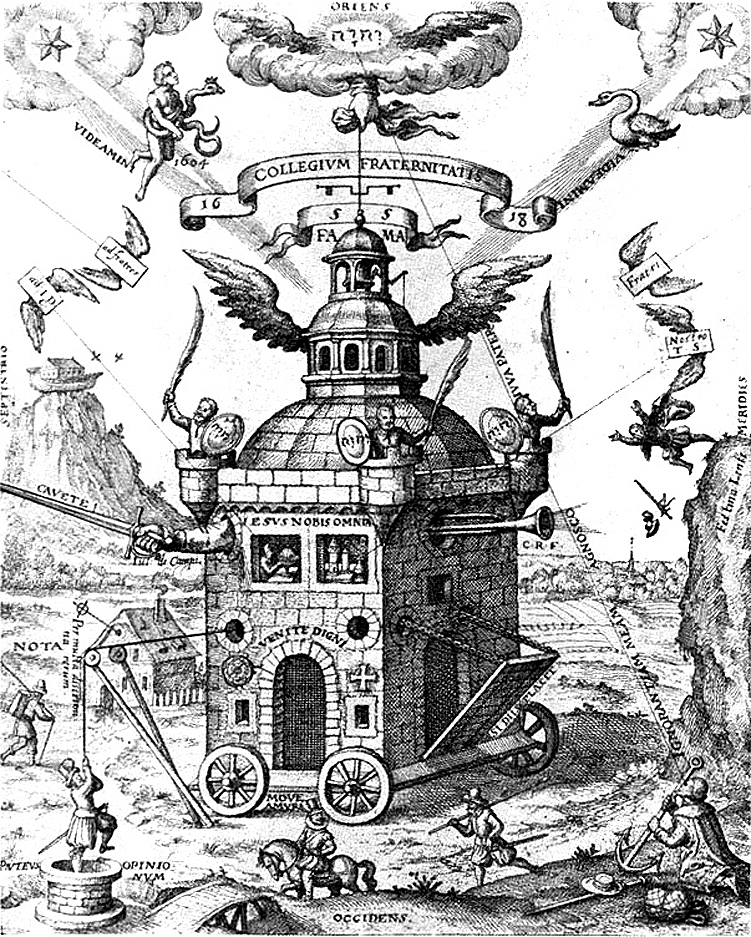
Emblematic image of a Rosicrucian College; illustration from Speculum sophicum Rhodo-stauroticum, a 1618 work by Theophilus Schweighardt. Frances Yates identifies this as the "Invisible College of the Rosy Cross. Robert Boyle was a member of this association.

Robert returned to England from continental Europe in mid-1644 with a keen interest in scientific research. His father, Lord Cork, had died the previous year and had left him the manor of Stalbridge in Dorset as well as substantial estates in County Limerick in Ireland that he had acquired. Robert then made his residence at Stalbridge House, between 1644 and 1652, and settled in a laboratory where he conducted many experiments. From that time, Robert devoted his life to scientific research and soon took a prominent place in the band of enquirers, known as the "Invisible College", who devoted themselves to the cultivation of the "new philosophy". They met frequently in London, often at Gresham College, and some of the members also had meetings at Oxford. Having made several visits to his Irish estates beginning in 1647, Robert moved to Ireland in 1652 but became frustrated at his inability to make progress in his chemical work. In one letter, he described Ireland as "a barbarous country where chemical spirits were so misunderstood and chemical instruments so unprocurable that it was hard to have any Hermetic thoughts in it."

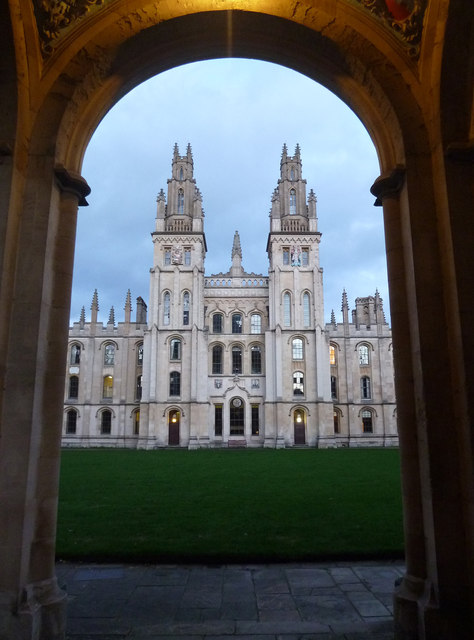
Boyle's arms (shown on the right right) displayed in the Great Quadrangle of All Souls College, Oxford

All Souls, Oxford University, shows the arms of Boyle's family in the colonnade of the Great Quadrangle, opposite the arms of the Hill family of Shropshire, close by a sundial designed by Boyle's friend Christopher Wren.

In 1654, Boyle left Ireland for Oxford to pursue his work more successfully. An inscription can be found on the wall of University College, Oxford, the High Street at Oxford (now the location of the Shelley Memorial), marking the spot where Cross Hall stood until the early 19th century. It was here that Boyle rented rooms from the wealthy apothecary who owned the Hall.

Reading in 1657 of Otto von Guericke's vacuum pump, he set himself, with the assistance of Robert Hooke, to devise improvements in its construction. His "machina Boyleana" or "Pneumatical Engine" was finished in 1659.

Among the critics of the views put forward in this book was a Jesuit, Francis Line (1595–1675), and it was while answering his objections that Boyle made his first mention of the law that the volume of a gas varies inversely to the pressure of the gas, which among English-speaking people is usually called Boyle's law, after his name. The person who originally formulated the hypothesis was Henry Power in 1661. Boyle in 1662 included a reference to a paper written by Power, but mistakenly attributed it to Richard Towneley. In continental Europe, the hypothesis is sometimes attributed to Edme Mariotte, although he did not publish it until 1676 and was probably aware of Boyle's work at the time.

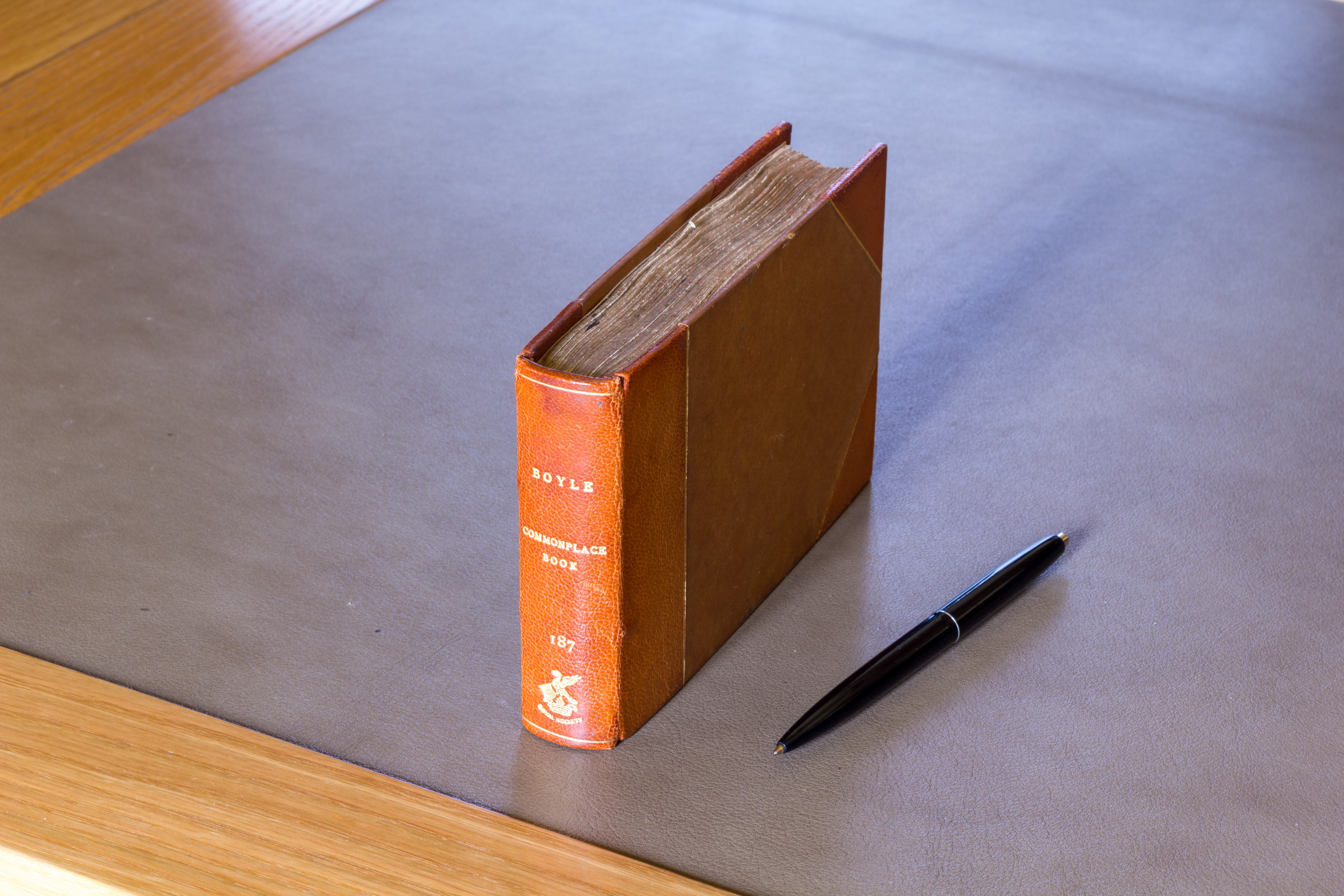
One of Robert Boyle's notebooks (1690–1691) held by the Royal Society of London. The Royal Society archives holds 46 volumes of philosophical, scientific and theological papers by Boyle and seven volumes of his correspondence.

In 1663 the Invisible College became The Royal Society of London for Improving Natural Knowledge, and the charter of incorporation granted by Charles II of England named Boyle a member of the council. In 1680 he was elected president of the society but declined the honour from a scruple about oaths.

He made a "wish list" of 24 possible inventions which included "the prolongation of life", the "art of flying", "perpetual light", "making armour light and extremely hard", "a ship to sail with all winds, and a ship not to be sunk", "practicable and certain way of finding longitudes", "potent drugs to alter or exalt imagination, waking, memory and other functions and appease pain, procure innocent sleep, harmless dreams, etc.". All but a few of the 24 have come true.

External audio
- "The Almost Forgotten Story of Katherine Jones, Lady Ranelagh", Distillations Podcast, Science History Institute

In 1668 he left Oxford for London where he resided at the house of his elder sister Katherine Jones, Lady Ranelagh, in Pall Mall. He experimented in the laboratory she had in her home and attended her salon of intellectuals interested in the sciences. The siblings maintained "a lifelong intellectual partnership, where brother and sister shared medical remedies, promoted each other's scientific ideas, and edited each other's manuscripts." His contemporaries widely acknowledged Katherine's influence on his work, but later historiographers dropped discussion of her accomplishments and relationship to her brother from their histories.

=== Later years ===
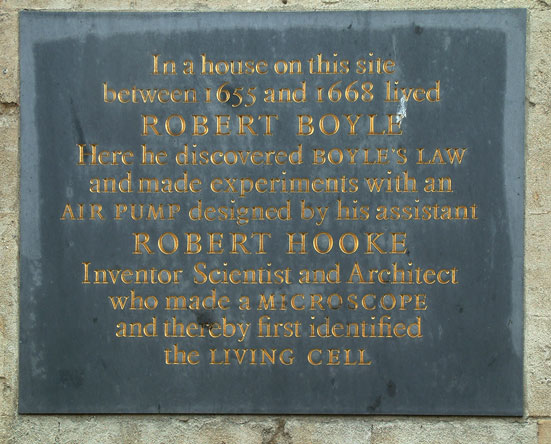
Plaque at the site of Boyle and Hooke's experiments in Oxford

In 1669 his health, never very strong, began to fail seriously and he gradually withdrew from his public engagements, ceasing his communications to the Royal Society, and advertising his desire to be excused from receiving guests, "unless upon occasions very extraordinary", on Tuesday and Friday forenoon, and Wednesday and Saturday afternoon. In the leisure thus gained he wished to "recruit his spirits, range his papers", and prepare some important chemical investigations which he proposed to leave "as a kind of Hermetic legacy to the studious disciples of that art", but of which he did not make known the nature. His health became still worse in 1691, and he died on 31 December that year, just a week after the death of his sister, Katherine, in whose home he had lived and with whom he had shared scientific pursuits for more than twenty years. Boyle died from paralysis. He was buried in the churchyard of St Martin-in-the-Fields, his funeral sermon being preached by his friend, Bishop Gilbert Burnet. In his will, Boyle endowed a series of lectures that came to be known as the Boyle Lectures.

== Scientific contributions ==
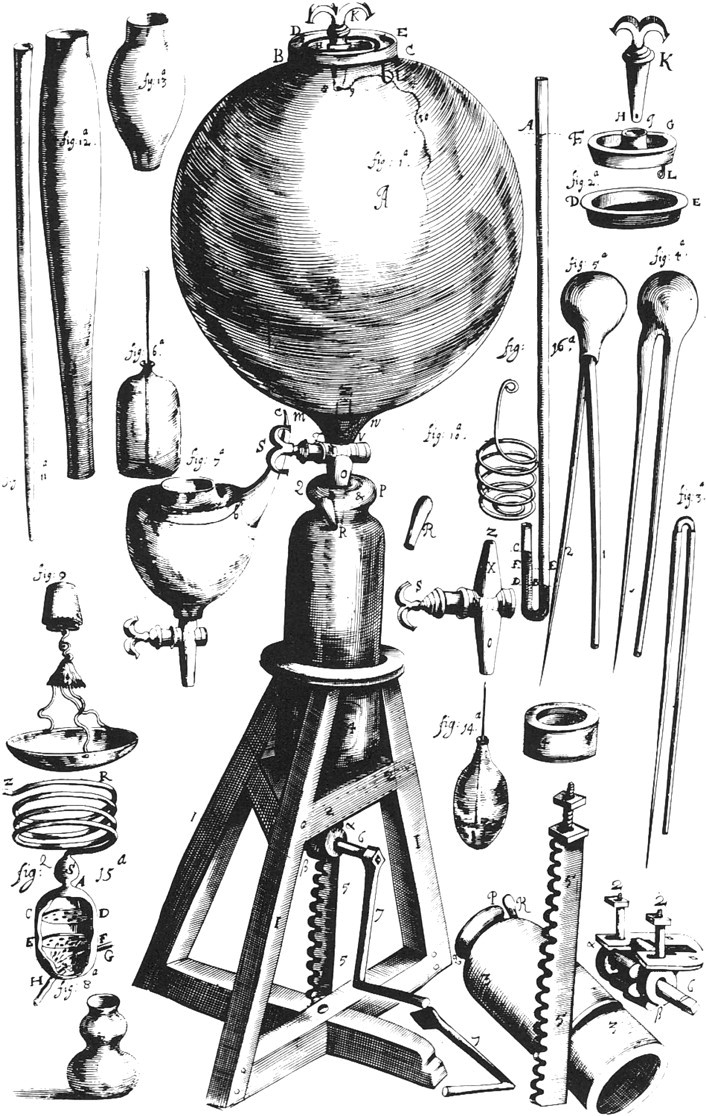
Boyle's vacuum pump. It illustrates: a 28.4-litre glass "receiver" (A) connected by a stopcock (S, N) to a 36-cm-long brass pumping cylinder, through which a padded piston (4) could be cranked by a toothed shaft with handle (5, 6, 7). To operate the air pump, first, the stopcock was closed, and the piston was cranked down. Then, with the stopcock opened, part of the air in the receiver moves into the cylinder. Then the stopcock was closed, the brass plug (R) removed, and the piston raised, expelling air from the cylinder. As the procedure was repeated, the air pressure in the receiver decreased.

Boyle's great merit as a scientific investigator is that he carried out the principles which Francis Bacon espoused in the Novum Organum. Yet he would not avow himself a follower of Bacon, or indeed of any other teacher.

=== Emphasis on experiments ===
On several occasions, he mentions that to keep his judgment as unprepossessed as might be with any of the modern theories of philosophy, until he was "provided of experiments" to help him judge of them. He refrained from any study of the atomical and the Cartesian systems, and even of the Novum Organum itself, though he admits to "transiently consulting" them about a few particulars. Nothing was more alien to his mental temperament than the spinning of hypotheses. "I, ... love not to believe any thing upon Conjectures, when by a not over-difficult Experiment I can try whether it be True or no..."

He regarded the acquisition of knowledge as an end in itself, and in consequence, he gained a wider outlook on the aims of scientific inquiry than had been enjoyed by his predecessors for many centuries. This, however, did not mean that he paid no attention to the practical application of science, nor that he despised practical knowledge.

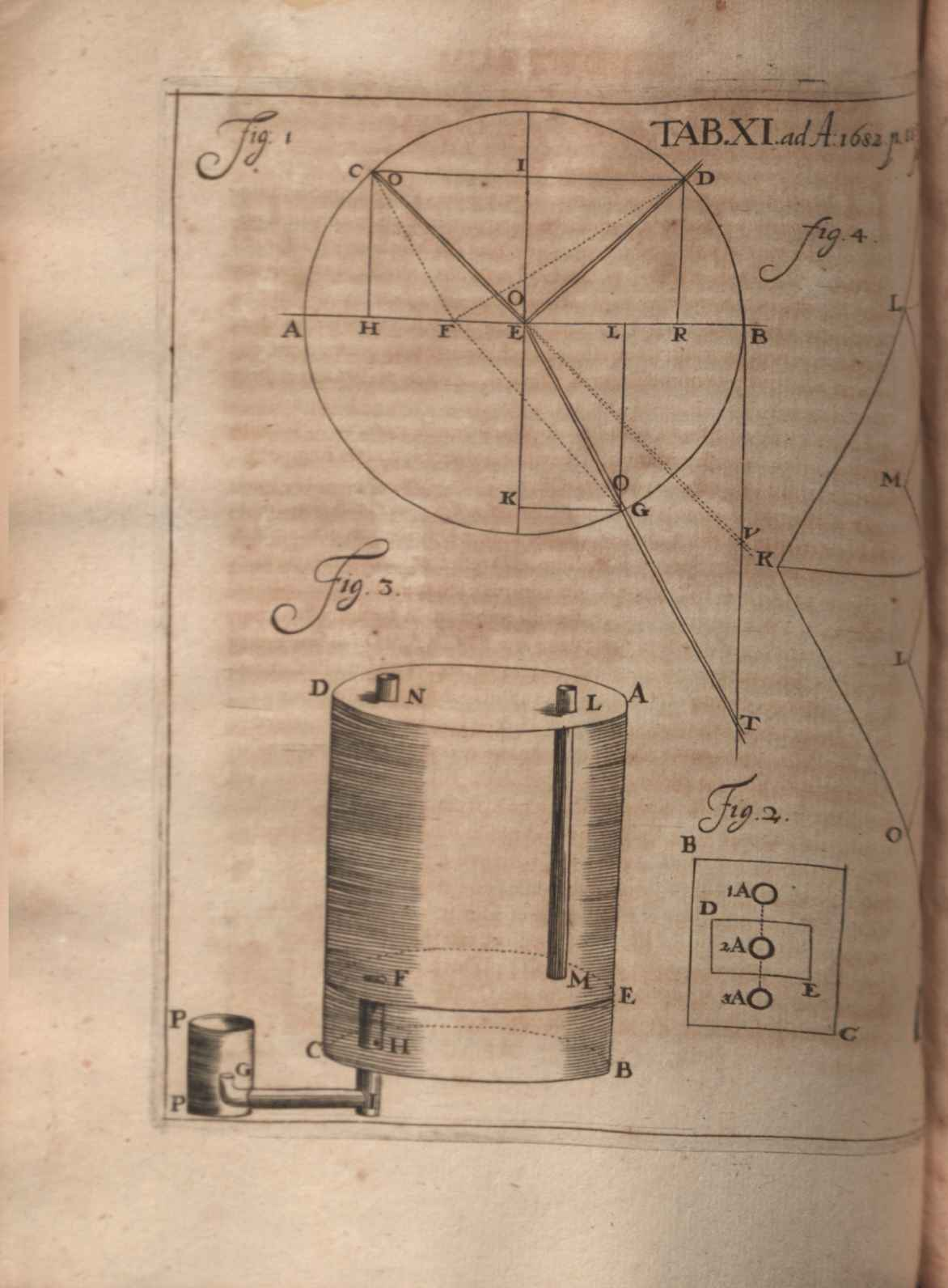
Fig. 3: Illustration of Excerptum ex collectionibus philosophicis anglicis... novum genus lampadis à Rob. Boyle ... published in Acta Eruditorum, 1682

=== Physics and chemistry ===
==== Vacuum pump ====
To Boyle, Guericke's vacuum pump had two important limitations. Firstly, its evacuation required "the continual labour of two strong men for divers hours", and secondly, "the Receiver, or Glass to be empty'd, consisting of one entire and uninterrupted Globe ... of Glass ... is so made, that things cannot be convey'd into it". Hooke constructed a pump that could be operated on a desktop, and conveniently opened to insert candles, mice, birds, bells, pendulums, and other research objects. With Hooke's pump, Boyle began a series of experiments on the properties of air. An account of Boyle's work with the pump was published in 1660 under the title New Experiments Physico-Mechanical, Touching the Spring of the Air, and its Effects.

==== Chemistry ====
Robert Boyle was an alchemist; and believing the transmutation of metals to be a possibility, he carried out experiments in the hope of achieving it; and he was instrumental in obtaining the repeal, by the Royal Mines Act 1688 (1 Will. & Mar. c. 30), of the statute of Henry IV against multiplying gold and silver, the Gold and Silver Act 1403 (5 Hen. 4. c. 4). With all the important work he accomplished in physics, chemistry was his peculiar and favourite study. His first book on the subject was The Sceptical Chymist, published in 1661, in which he criticised the "experiments whereby vulgar Spagyrists are wont to endeavour to evince their Salt, Sulphur and Mercury to be the true Principles of Things". For him, chemistry was the science of the composition of substances, not merely an adjunct to the arts of the alchemist or the physician.

==== Elements, compounds, and particles of matter ====
Boyle endorsed the view of elements as the undecomposable constituents of material bodies; and made the distinction between mixtures and compounds. He made considerable progress in the technique of detecting their ingredients, a process which he designated by the term "analysis". He further supposed that the elements were ultimately composed of particles of various sorts and sizes, into which, however, they were not to be resolved in any known way. He studied the chemistry of combustion and of respiration, and conducted experiments in physiology, where, however, he was hampered by the "tenderness of his nature" which kept him from anatomical dissections, especially vivisections, though he knew them to be "most instructing".

==== "Factitious airs" ====
Around 1670, upon producing what is now known to be hydrogen, Boyle coined the term "factitious airs". Factitious means "artificial, not natural". Later, English chemist and physicist Henry Cavendish used the term "factitious air" to refer to "any kind of air which is contained in other bodies in an unelastic state, and is produced from thence by art".

==== Heat ====
Like English philosopher Francis Bacon, Galileo Galilei, and Robert Hooke had done before him, Boyle declared that heat consists of the motion of the invisible, constituent particles of objects.

==== Other contributions ====
Among his major work in and contributions to physics were Boyle's law, the discovery of the role played by air in the propagation of sound, and investigations of the expansive force of freezing water, specific gravities, refractive powers, crystals, electricity, colour, and hydrostatics.

== Theological interests ==
In addition to philosophy, Boyle devoted much time to theology, showing a very decided leaning to the practical side and an indifference to controversial polemics. At the Restoration of Charles II of England in 1660, he was favourably received at court and in 1665 would have received the provostship of Eton College had he agreed to take holy orders, but this he refused to do on the ground that his writings on religious subjects would have greater weight coming from a layman than a paid minister of the Church.

Moreover, Boyle incorporated his scientific interests into his theology, believing that natural philosophy could provide powerful evidence for the existence of God. In works such as Disquisition about the Final Causes of Natural Things (1688), for instance, he criticised contemporary philosophers – such as René Descartes – who denied that the study of nature could reveal much about God. Instead, Boyle argued that natural philosophers could use the design apparently on display in some parts of nature to demonstrate God's involvement with the world. He also attempted to tackle complex theological questions using methods derived from his scientific practices. In Some Physico-Theological Considerations about the Possibility of the Resurrection (1675), he used a chemical experiment known as the reduction to the pristine state as part of an attempt to demonstrate the physical possibility of the resurrection of the body. Throughout his career, Boyle tried to show that science could lend support to Christianity.

As a director of the East India Company he spent large sums in promoting the spread of Christianity in the East, contributing liberally to missionary societies and to the expenses of translating the Bible or portions of it into various languages. Boyle supported the policy that the Bible should be available in the vernacular language of the people. An Irish language version of the New Testament was published in 1602 but was rare in Boyle's adult life. In 1680–85 Boyle personally financed the printing of the Bible, both Old and New Testaments, in Irish. In this respect, Boyle's attitude to the Irish language differed from the Protestant Ascendancy class in Ireland at the time, which was generally hostile to the language and largely opposed the use of Irish (not only as a language of religious worship).

Boyle also had a monogenist perspective about race origin. He was a pioneer in studying races, and he believed that all human beings, no matter how diverse their physical differences, came from the same source: Adam and Eve. He studied reported stories of parents giving birth to different coloured albinos, so he concluded that Adam and Eve were originally white and that Caucasians could give birth to different coloured races. Boyle also extended the theories of Robert Hooke and Isaac Newton about colour and light via optical projection (in physics) into discourses of polygenesis, speculating that maybe these differences were due to "seminal impressions". Taking this into account, it might be considered that he envisioned a good explanation for complexion at his time, due to the fact that now we know that skin colour is disposed of by genes. Boyle's writings mention that at his time, for "European Eyes", beauty was not measured so much in colour of skin, but in "stature, comely symmetry of the parts of the body, and good features in the face". Various members of the scientific community rejected his views and described them as "disturbing" or "amusing".

In his will, Boyle provided money for a series of lectures to defend the Christian religion against those he considered "notorious infidels, namely atheists, deists, pagans, Jews and Muslims", with the provision that controversies between Christians were not to be mentioned (see Boyle Lectures).

== Awards and honours ==
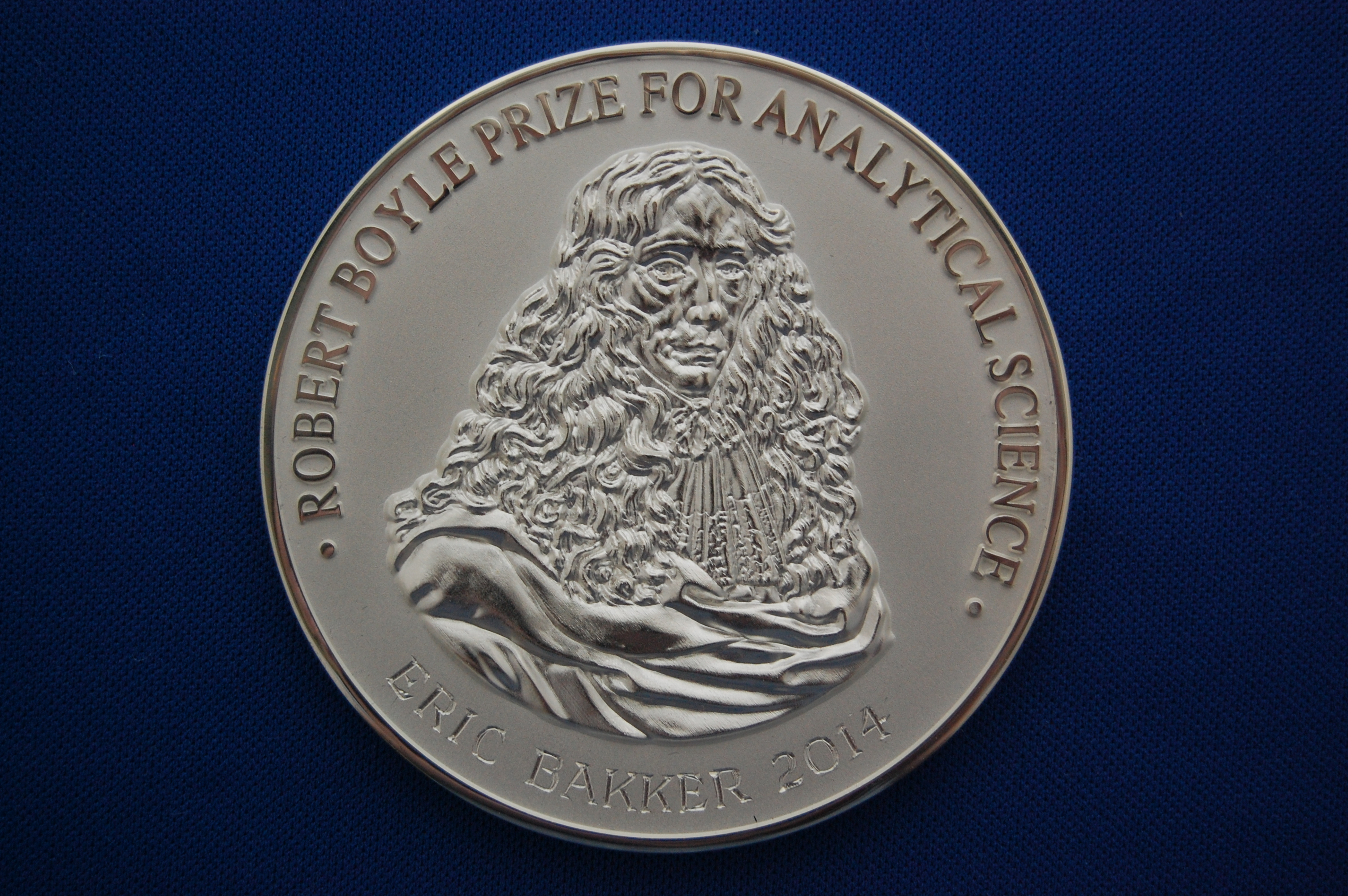
The 2014 Robert Boyle Prize for Analytical Science medal

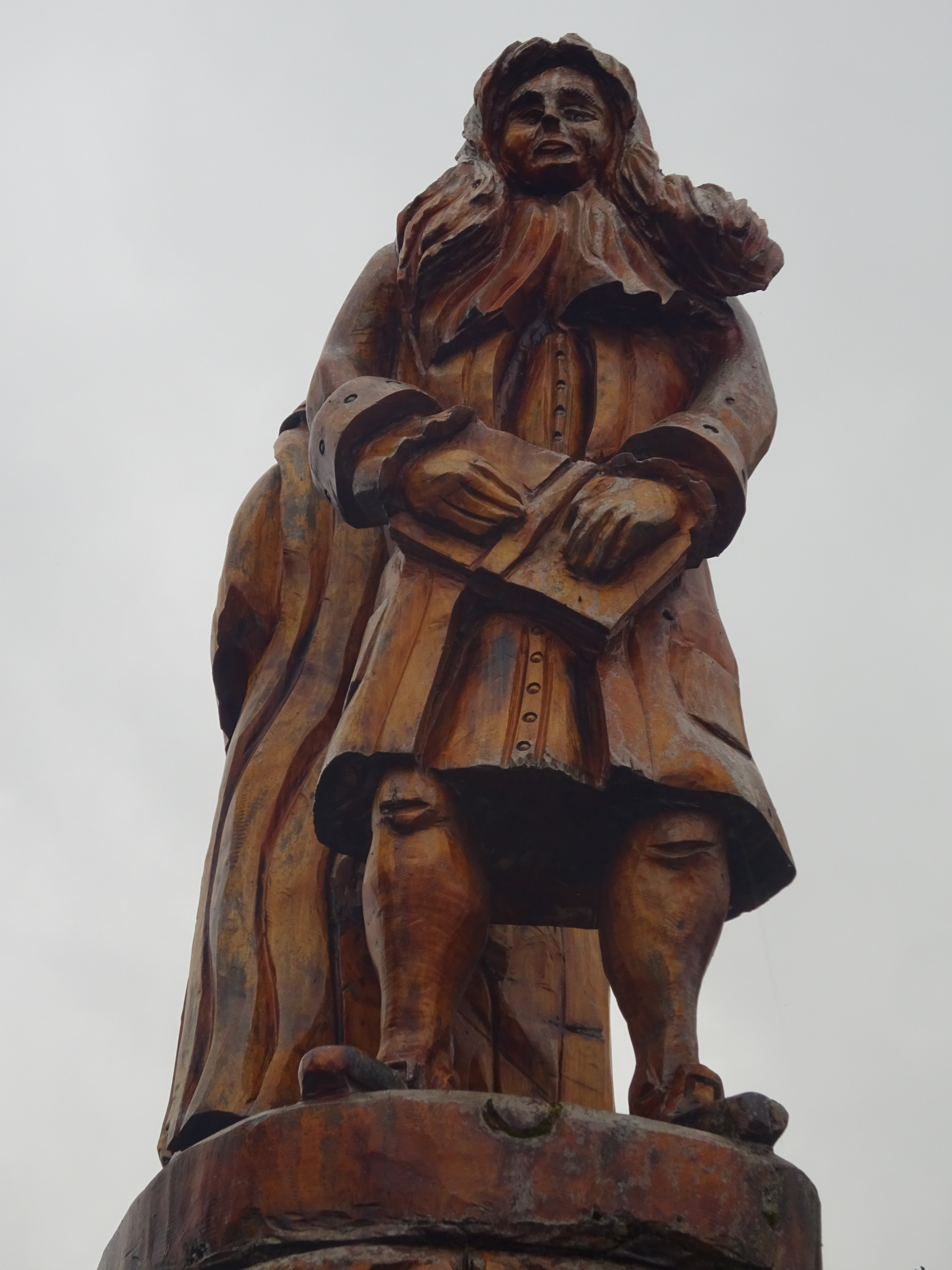
Statue of Boyle in Lismore, County Waterford, Ireland

As a founder of the Royal Society, he was elected a Fellow of the Royal Society (FRS) in 1663. Boyle's law is named in his honour. The Royal Society of Chemistry issues a Robert Boyle Prize for Analytical Science, named in his honour. The Boyle Medal for Scientific Excellence in Ireland, inaugurated in 1899, is awarded jointly by the Royal Dublin Society and The Irish Times. Launched in 2012, The Robert Boyle Summer School organized by the Waterford Institute of Technology with support from Lismore Castle, is held annually to honor the heritage of Robert Boyle.

== Important works ==
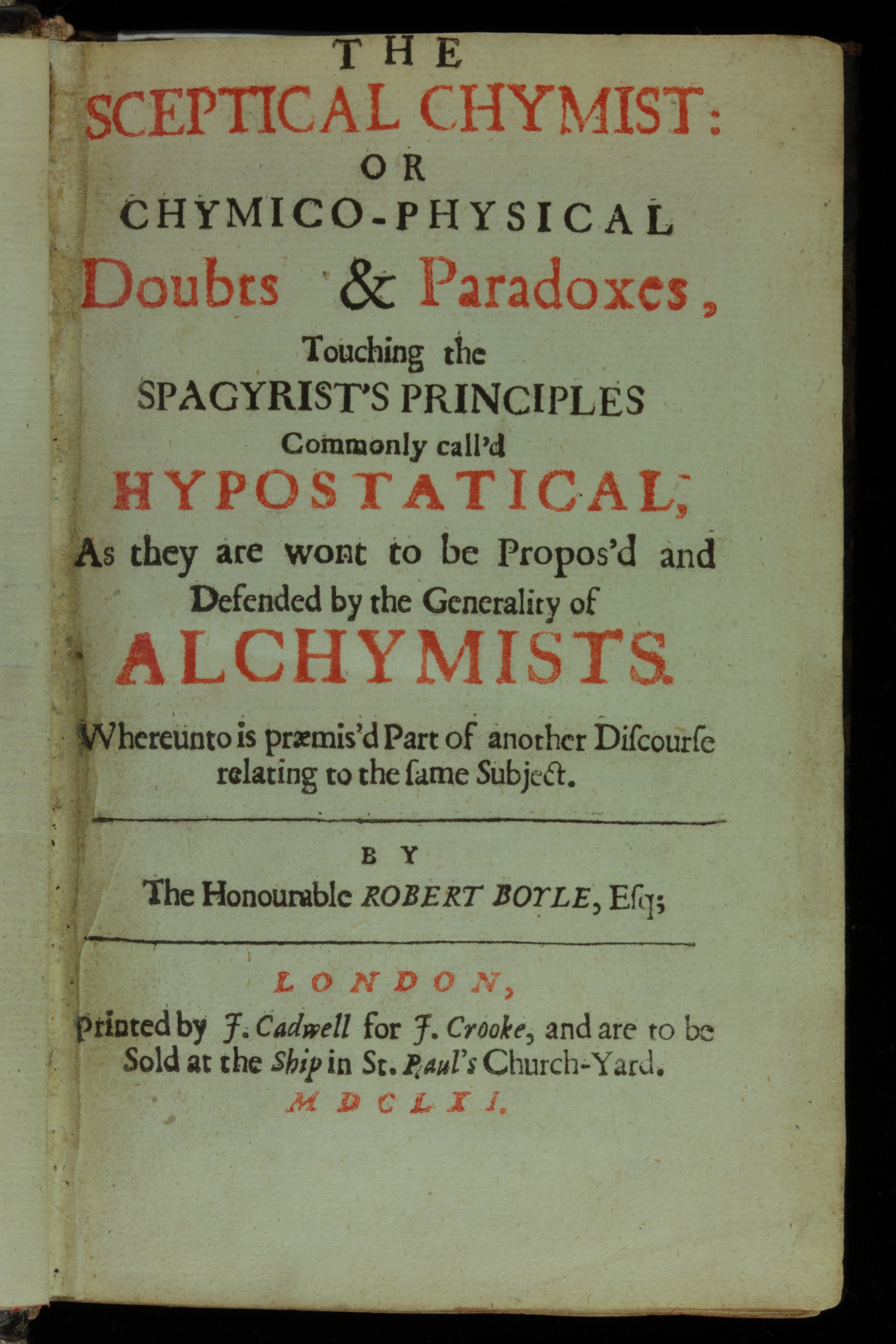
Title page of The Sceptical Chymist (1661)

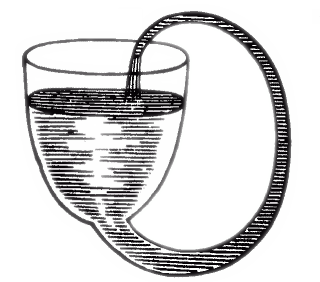
Boyle's self-flowing flask, a perpetual motion machine, appears to fill itself through siphon action ("hydrostatic perpetual motion") and involves the "hydrostatic paradox". This is not possible in reality; a siphon requires its "output" to be lower than the "input".

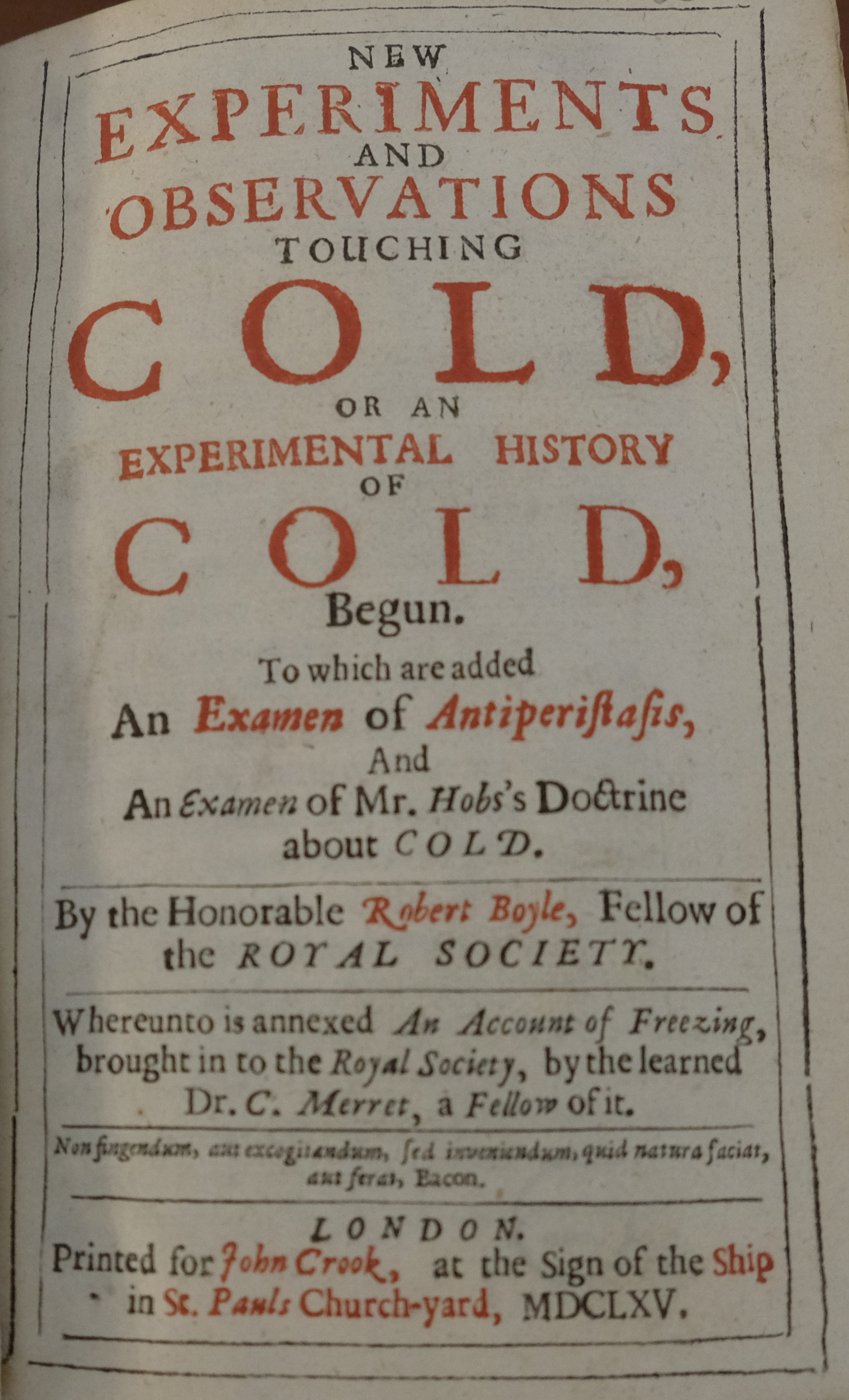
Title page of "New Experiments and Observations Touching Cold" (1665)

The following are some of the more important of his works:

- 1660 – New Experiments Physico-Mechanical: Touching the Spring of the Air and their Effects
- 1661 – The Sceptical Chymist
- 1662 – Whereunto is Added a Defence of the Authors Explication of the Experiments, Against the Obiections of Franciscus Linus and Thomas Hobbes (a book-length addendum to the second edition of New Experiments Physico-Mechanical)
- 1663 – Considerations touching the Usefulness of Experimental Natural Philosophy (followed by a second part in 1671)
- 1664 – Experiments and Considerations Touching Colours, with Observations on a Diamond that Shines in the Dark
- 1665 – New Experiments and Observations Touching Cold
- 1666 – Hydrostatical Paradoxes
- 1666 – Origin of Forms and Qualities according to the Corpuscular Philosophy. (A continuation of his work on the spring of air demonstrated that a reduction in ambient pressure could lead to bubble formation in living tissue. This description of a viper in a vacuum was the first recorded description of decompression sickness.)
- 1669 – A Continuation of New Experiments Physico-mechanical, Touching the Spring and Weight of the Air, and Their Effects
- 1670 – Tracts about the Cosmical Qualities of Things, the Temperature of the Subterraneal and Submarine Regions, the Bottom of the Sea, &tc. with an Introduction to the History of Particular Qualities
- 1672 – Origin and Virtues of Gems
- 1673 – Essays of the Strange Subtilty, Great Efficacy, Determinate Nature of Effluviums
- 1674 – Two volumes of tracts on the Saltiness of the Sea, Suspicions about the Hidden Realities of the Air, Cold, Celestial Magnets
- 1674 – Animadversions upon Mr. Hobbes's Problemata de Vacuo
- 1676 – Experiments and Notes about the Mechanical Origin or Production of Particular Qualities, including some notes on electricity and magnetism
- 1678 – Observations upon an artificial Substance that Shines without any Preceding Illustration
- 1680 – The Aerial Noctiluca
- 1682 – New Experiments and Observations upon the Icy Noctiluca (a further continuation of his work on the air)
- 1684 – Memoirs for the Natural History of the Human Blood
- 1685 – Short Memoirs for the Natural Experimental History of Mineral Waters
- 1686 – A Free Enquiry into the Vulgarly Received Notion of Nature
- 1690 – Medicina Hydrostatica
- 1691 – Experimenta et Observationes Physicae

Among his religious and philosophical writings were:

- 1648 (1659) – Some Motives and Incentives to the Love of God, often known by its running head Seraphic Love, written in 1648, but not published until 1659
- 1663 – Some Considerations Touching the Style of the H[oly] Scriptures
- 1664 – Excellence of Theology compared with Natural Philosophy
- 1665 – Occasional Reflections upon Several Subjects, which was ridiculed by Swift in Meditation Upon a Broomstick, and by Butler in An Occasional Reflection on Dr Charlton's Feeling a Dog's Pulse at Gresham College
- 1675 – Some Considerations about the Reconcileableness of Reason and Religion, with a Discourse about the Possibility of the Resurrection
- 1687 – The Martyrdom of Theodora, and of Didymus, major source for Handel's Oratorio Theodora
- 1690 – The Christian Virtuoso

== See also ==
- Ambrose Godfrey – German-English chemist (1660–1741), phosphorus manufacturer who started as Boyle's assistant
- An Experiment on a Bird in the Air Pump – 1768 painting by Joseph Wright of Derby, a painting of a demonstration of one of Boyle's experiments
- Boyle temperature – Thermodynamic property of real gas, thermodynamic quantity named after Boyle
- George Starkey – Colonial American alchemist, medical practitioner and writer
- Invisible College – Informal group of scholars, as in Royal Society of London's precursor groups
