= Sebastian Petrycy =

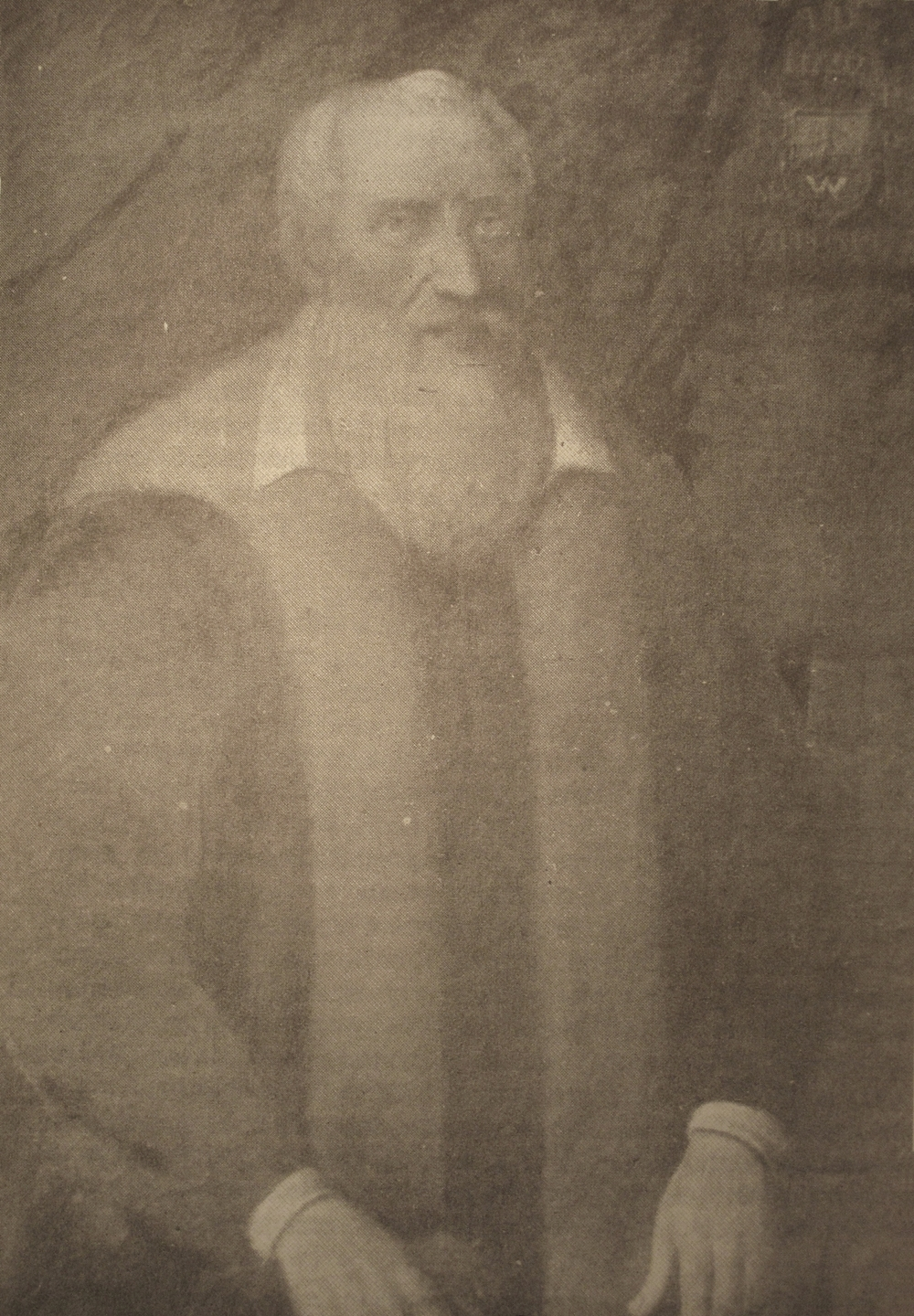
Portrait of Sebastian Petrycy, c. 16th century

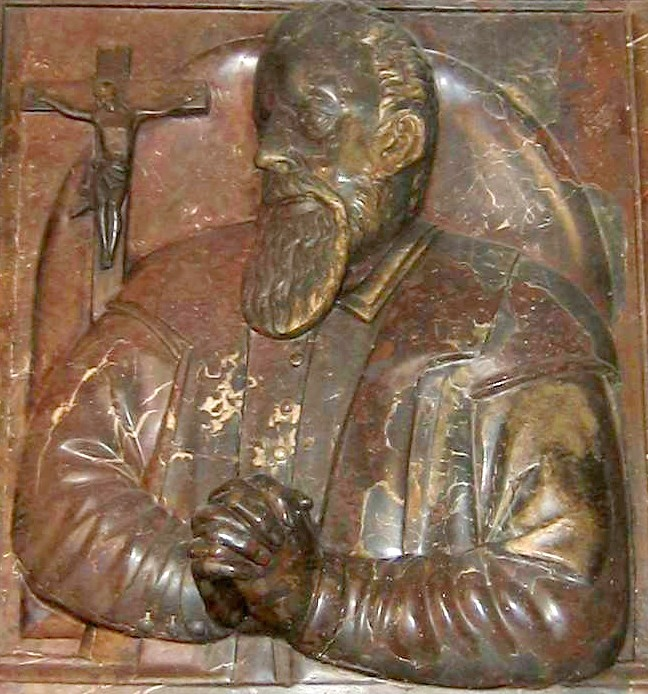
Sebastian Petrycy's tomb effigy, Kraków

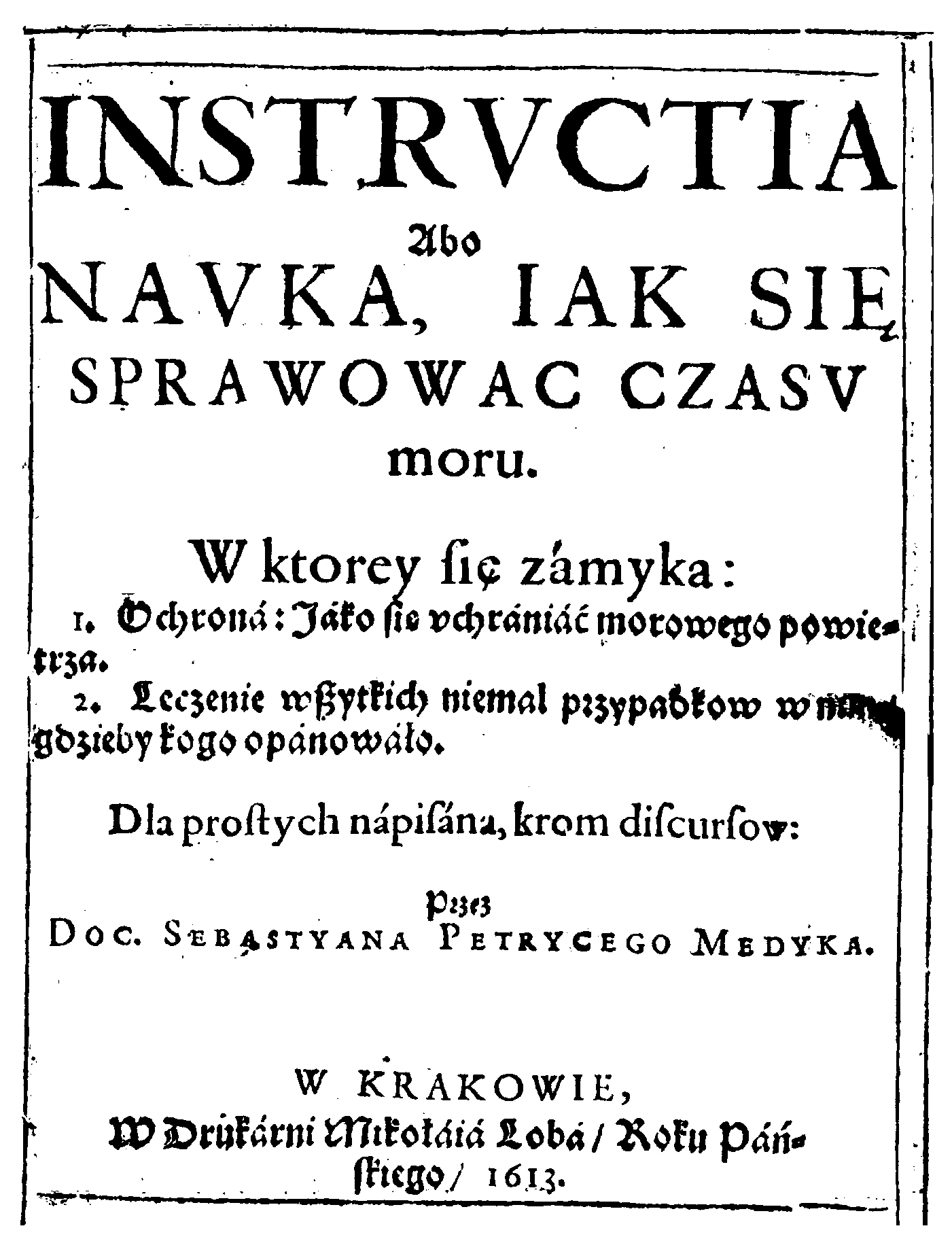
Book by Petrycy published in Kraków in 1613 about prevention against "bad air".

Sebastian Petrycy of Pilzno (born 1554 in Pilzno – died 1626 in Kraków), in Latin known as Sebastianus Petricius, was a Polish philosopher and physician. He lectured and published notable works in the field of medicine but is principally remembered for his masterly Polish translations of philosophical works by Aristotle and for his commentaries to them. Petrycy made major contributions to nascent Polish philosophical terminology.

== Life ==
Sebastian Petrycy received his Master of Arts degree at Kraków in 1573 and his doctor of medicine degree at Padua in 1590.

Petrycy published his Polish translations of Aristotle's practical works, the Ethics, Politics and Economics, together with his own extensive commentaries. In these, he laid stress, in the theory of knowledge, on experiment and induction; in psychology, on feeling and will; and in politics, he preached democratic ideas. The focus of his thought was practical philosophy, ethics and politics. His interest in practical questions and his linking of philosophical theory with the needs of national life was a feature common to Petrycy and to leading Polish thinkers of periods that were to follow.

In 1601-18, a period when translations into modern languages were still rarities, he accomplished masterful translations of Aristotle's practical works into Polish. With Petrycy, vernacular Polish philosophical terminology began to develop not much later than did the French and German. This was an auspicious beginning, but would be neglected in the 17th and 18th centuries.

Petrycy practiced medicine in Lwów and at the side of Wojewoda Jerzy Mniszech, whom he accompanied to Moscow in 1606.

In 1608–17 Petrycy lectured in medicine at the Kraków Academy. His medical writings, which included "De natura, causis, symptomatis morbi gallici eiusque curatione...", combined deductive reasoning with observation and experiment. An educator and practicing physician, he worked especially among the poor populace.

== See also ==
- History of philosophy in Poland
- List of Poles
- Physician writer
