= Wolinski =

Woliński (feminine: Wolińska; plural: Wolińscy), sometimes Angelisised as Wolinski and Wolinsky, is a Polish surname. Notable people with the surname include:

- Dawid Woliński (born 1977), Polish fashion designer
- Georges Wolinski (1934–2015), French cartoonist and comics writer; husband of Maryse Wolinski
- Hawk Wolinski (born 1948), U.S. keyboardist, songwriter, and record producer
- Henryk Woliński (1901–1986), Polish resistance movement member during World War II
- Maryse Wolinski (1943–2021), French writer and journalist; widow of Georges Wolinski
- Naomi Wolinski (1881–1969), Australian sports activist/administrator and World War II fundraiser
- Sidney Wolinsky, Canadian-American film editor

== See also ==
- Walinski
