= Francis Line =

Jesuit priest and scientist

The Reverend Francis Line SJ
- Born: 1595; London
- Died: 15 November 1675 (aged 79–80); Liège (Belgium)
- Other names: Linus of Liège, Franciscus Linus
- Occupation: Jesuit priest
- Known for: magnetic clock

Francis Line, SJ (1595 – 15 November 1675), also known as Linus of Liège, was a Jesuit priest and scientist. He is known for inventing a magnetic clock. He is noted as a contemporary critic of the theories and work of Isaac Newton. He also challenged Robert Boyle and his law of gases.

== Life ==
Line, who used the alias Hall, was born in 1595, most probably in London, or Buckinghamshire. He entered the Society of Jesus in 1623, was ordained priest in 1628, and was professed of the four vows on 20 August 1640.

For many years Line was professor of Hebrew and mathematics at the Jesuit college at Liège. He was sent on the English mission about 1656, and for a short time he served in the Derby district. During 1659 and for several years he was in the London district; and in 1665 he was stationed in the Lancashire district. During the time that he was serving the English mission he constructed the dial which was set up in the king's private garden at Whitehall on 24 July 1669. In 1672 he was again at Liège, where he was spiritual father, and where he died on 25 November (N.S.) 1675.

== Dial at Whitehall Palace ==
Line created a dial for Charles II in 1669. It was fully described in An Explication of the Diall (1673). It stood on a pedestal, and consisted of six parts, rising one above the other, with multitudes of planes cut on each, which were dials for the purposes of geography, astrology, and astronomy. It was smashed by the Earl of Rochester and drunken friends in 1675.

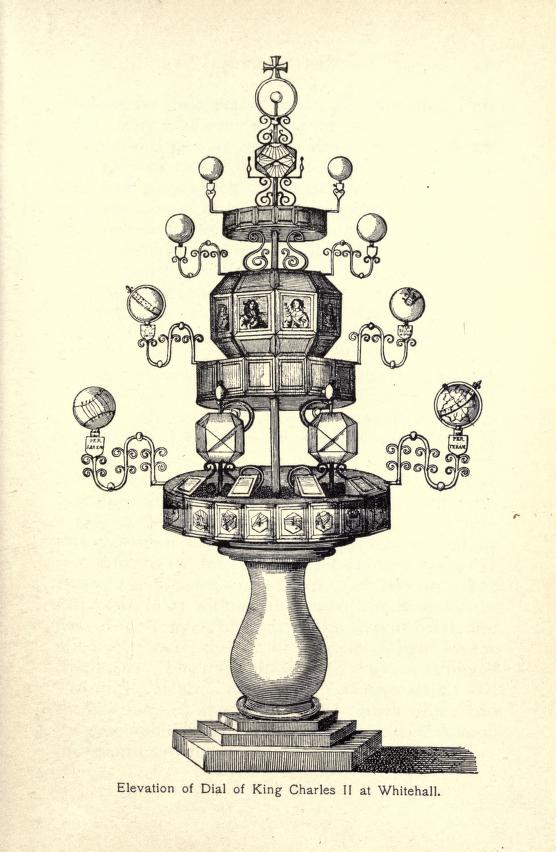
Francis Line's dial for Whitehall Palace, illustration copied from a work by William Leybourn

== Works ==
His works are:

- Refutation of the attempt to Square the Circle, London, 1660; on the controversy over Gregory à Vincentio's De quadraturâ Circuli and reply of Christiaan Huyghens.
- Tractatus de Corporum Inseparabilitate, London, 1661. A reply by Gilbert Clerke was published under the title of Tractatus de Restitutione Corporum in quo experimenta Torricelliana et Boyliana explicantur, et Rarefactio Cartesiana defenditur, London, 1662. Another reply was A Defence of the Doctrine touching the Spring and Weight of the Air, proposed by Mr. Robert Boyle, in his new Physico-Mechanical Experiments; against the objections of F. Linus. By the Author of those Experiments, London, 1662.
- A Letter [dated 6 Oct. 1674] animadverting on Newton's Theory of Light and Colors, in Philosophical Transactions, ix. 217. A scientific debate followed in the pages of The Philosophical Transactions, drawing in Anthony Lucas after Line's death.
- Some Optical Assertions concerning the Rain-bow, transmitted from Liege, where they were publicly discussed in August last: Delivered here in the same Language [Latin], wherein they were communicated, in Philosophical Transactions, 26 Sept. 1675, x. 386.
- A Treatise on the Barometer.
- Tractatus de Horologiis, manuscript, preserved in the library of the university of Liège.

== See also ==
- List of Roman Catholic scientist-clerics
