= Suspicions about the Hidden Realities of the Air =

1674 book on alchemy by Robert Boyle

Suspicions about the Hidden Realities of the Air is a book on alchemy by the 17th-century Anglo-Irish philosopher Robert Boyle. It was written in 1674 concerning ideas about the agency of the air in chemical reactions. Air at this time was considered homogeneous, empty and inactive.

== Premise ==
Boyle wrote:

I have often suspected, that there may be in the Air some yet more latent Qualities or Powers differing enough from all these, and principally due to the Substantial Parts or Ingredients, whereof it consists.

For this is not as many imagine a simple and elementary body, but a confused aggregate of 'effluviums' from such differing bodies, that, though they all agree in constituting by their minuteness and various motions one great mass of fluid matter, yet perhaps there is scarce a more heterogeneous body in the world.

== Impact in chemistry ==
Although his research and personal philosophy clearly has its roots in the alchemical tradition, Boyle is largely regarded today as the first modern chemist, and therefore one of the founders of modern chemistry. It was by examining the part played by the air in processes of calcination and burning that it became possible to give approximately complete descriptions of these processes, which led to the gradual scientific rejection of Phlogiston.

Among Boyle's more popular works is The Sceptical Chymist, seen as a cornerstone book in the field of chemistry.
