= Walinski =

Walinski or Waliński (feminine: Walińska) is a Polish surname. Notable people with the surname include:

- Anna Walinska (1906–1997), American painter
- Marcin Waliński (born 1990), Polish volleyball player
- Nicholas Joseph Walinski Jr. (1920–1992), United States district judge
