= Janusz Wolański =

Polish footballer

Personal information
- Date of birth: 13 July 1979 (age 47)
- Place of birth: Pilzno, Poland
- Height: 1.70 m (5 ft 7 in)
- Position: Midfielder

Team information
- Current team: Brzostowianka Brzostek
- Number: 9

Senior career*
Years	Team	Apps	(Gls)
1997–2001	Wisłoka Dębica		
2001–2002	Ceramika Opoczno		
2002–2003	Szczakowianka Jaworzno	46	(7)
2003–2004	Górnik Łęczna	22	(2)
2005–2006	Zagłębie Sosnowiec	46	(11)
2006–2007	Jagiellonia Białystok	28	(6)
2007–2008	Polonia Bytom	39	(4)
2009–2010	ŁKS Łódź	30	(4)
2010–2011	KSZO Ostrowiec	25	(2)
2011–2014	Kolejarz Stróże	91	(14)
2014	Wisłoka Dębica	15	(1)
2015	Poroniec Poronin	31	(4)
2016	Karpaty Krosno	14	(1)
2016–2017	Wisłok Wiśniowa	49	(11)
2018–2021	Kamieniarz Golemki	77	(31)
2021–	Brzostowianka Brzostek	87	(66)
- * Club domestic league appearances and goals as of 10:48, 23 June 2025 (UTC)

Janusz Wolański (born 13 July 1979) is a Polish footballer who plays as a midfielder for regional league club Brzostowianka Brzostek.

== Honours ==
Poroniec Poronin

- Polish Cup (Nowy Sącz - Podhale regionals): 2014–15

Brzostowianka Brzostek

- Klasa A Dębica: 2023–24
