= Przyjaciel coat of arms =

Polish coat of arms

Przyjaciel
- Alternative names: Kemlada, Kemlad, Kamrad, Kamerad
- Earliest mention: 1164-1166
- Families: 20 names Bohusław, Downarowicz, Dramiński, Dranicki, Dulewski, Grabowski, Hryniewicz, Janowicz, Jurowski, Klimkiewicz, Ladziński, Ładziński, Lipiński, Maciejewicz, Mackiewicz, Mickiewicz, Migiewicz, Minasiewicz, Mingajłowicz, Mirosławski, Muraszko, Muśnicki, Dowbor – Muśnicki, Nagrodzki, Nowaczyński, Nowakowicz, Pawłowicz, Połtorzycki, Romanowski, Skirmunt – Strawiżski, Szumowiecki, Tomkowicz, Więckowicz, Wojciechowicz, Wolański, Żabiński

Przyjaciel (Polish for "Friend") also known as "de Pryjatel" and "Amicus" is a Polish coat of arms. It was used by several szlachta (noble) families under the Kingdom of Poland and the Polish–Lithuanian Commonwealth.

== History ==
The coat of arms has its source in the following historical event during the reign of the Polish King, Bolesław IV the Curly (Kędzierzawy) (1125-1173), Duke Henryk, Prince of Sandomierz, the king's brother, was waging war against the still pagan Prussians, in 1164, and was killed in a battle. The knight Mirosław, who hailed from the east, as his name suggests, and who was in the service of the king and king's brother, Henryk, broke through the enemy lines with his men, in order to retrieve Henryk's body and valuable armor, but was killed himself in the process. For Mirosław's steadfast loyalty, in the memory of his bravery, King Bolesław of Poland bestowed this coat of arms and lands to Mirosław's descendants.

== Blazon ==
A shield of blue color, with a heart in a vessel, pierced from top to bottom by an arrow, helmet with five ostrich feathers, and the blue and yellow fringe, signifying the ancient colors of knight Mirosław's ancestral origins.

== Notable bearers ==
Notable bearers of this coat of arms have included:

- Józef Dowbor-Muśnicki, military officer and commander
- Józef Epifani Minasowicz, publisher, poet, translator, journalist and editor
- Tadeusz Wolański, archaeologist and researcher of inscriptions in the Etruscan language
- Medard Downarowicz, political activist and minister
- Andrzej Downarowicz, podstarosta and judge
- Tadeusz Downarowicz, member of the Great Sejm
- Bohdan Pawłowicz, writer, journalist, radio broadcaster, military officer, Polonia activist
- Jurowski family

== Gallery ==
Przyjaciel II (families: Lisiecki, Hryniewicz, Mackiewicz, Wojciechowicz)

Grabowski IV (variation)

Downarowicz (variation)

== See also ==
- Polish heraldry
- Heraldic family
- List of Polish nobility coats of arms

== Bibliography ==
- Juliusz Ostrowski, Księga herbowa rodów polskich. Warszawa 1897
- Tadeusz Gajl: Herbarz polski od średniowiecza do XX wieku : ponad 4500 herbów szlacheckich 37 tysięcy nazwisk 55 tysięcy rodów. L&L, 2007. ISBN 978-83-60597-10-1.
