= Wolany =

Wolany may refer to the following places in Poland:

- Wolany, Lower Silesian Voivodeship (south-west Poland)
- Wolany, Masovian Voivodeship (east-central Poland)
