= AB5 toxin =

Enterotoxin (OB-fold B subunit)

Identifiers
- Symbol: Enterotoxin
- InterPro: IPR008992
- SCOP2: 2bos / SCOPe / SUPFAM
Available protein structures:
- PDB: IPR008992
- AlphaFold: IPR008992

The AB_{5} toxins are six-component protein complexes secreted by certain pathogenic bacteria known to cause human diseases such as cholera, dysentery, and hemolytic–uremic syndrome. One component is known as the A subunit, and the remaining five components are B subunits. All of these toxins share a similar structure and mechanism for entering targeted host cells. The B subunit is responsible for binding to receptors to open up a pathway for the A subunit to enter the cell. The A subunit is then able to use its catalytic machinery to take over the host cell's regular functions.

== Families ==
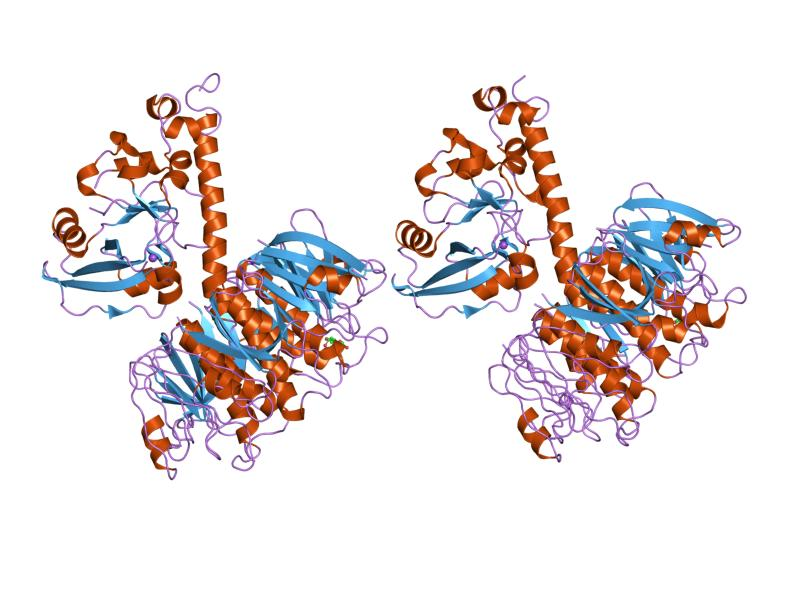
Ribbon diagram of cholera toxin. From PDB: 1s5e.

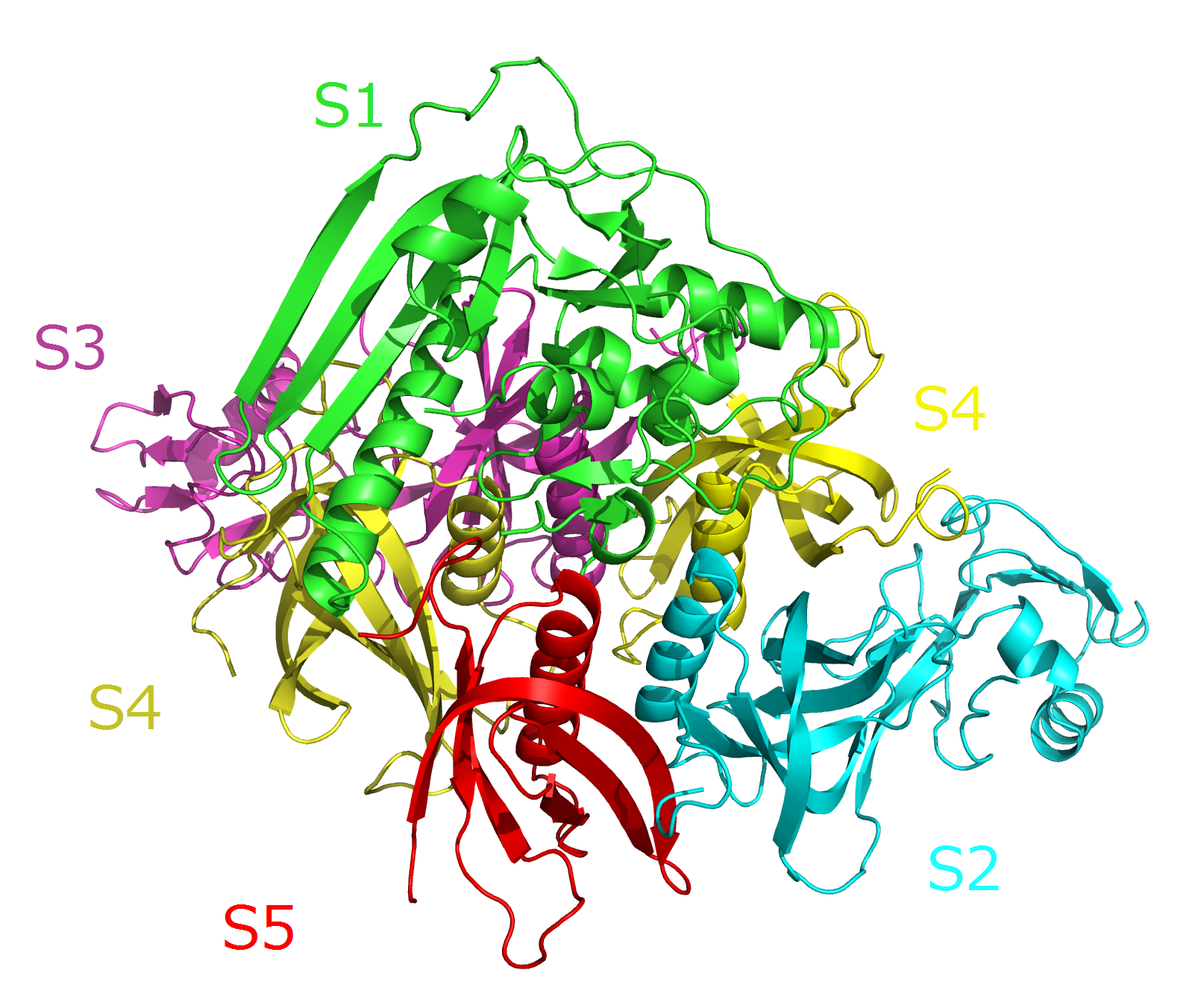
Ribbon diagram of pertussis toxin. S1 is the A subunit, and S2-S5 make up the B subunit.

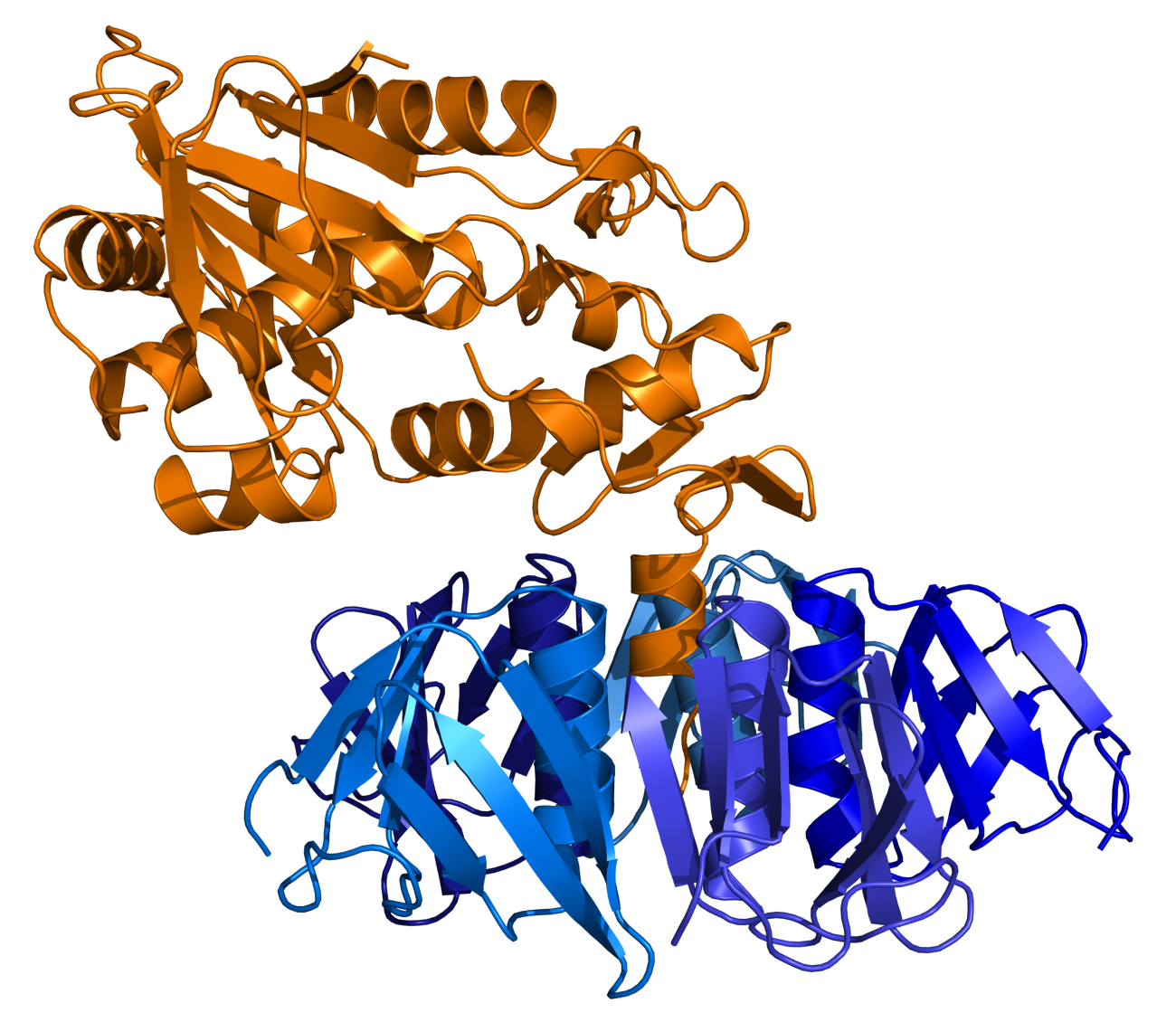
Ribbon diagram of shiga toxin (Stx) from Shigella dysenteriae, showing the characteristic AB5 structure. A subunit is in orange and B-subunit complex is in blue. From PDB: 1R4Q.

There are four main families of the AB5 toxin. These families are characterized by the sequence of their A (catalytic) subunit, as well as their catalytic activity.

=== Cholera toxin ===
This family is also known as Ct or Ctx, and also includes the heat-labile enterotoxin, known as LT. Cholera toxin's discovery is credited by many to Dr. Sambhu Nath De. He conducted his research in Calcutta (now Kolkata) making his discovery in 1959, although it was first purified by Robert Koch in 1883. Cholera toxin is composed of a protein complex that is secreted by the bacterium Vibrio cholerae. Some symptoms of this toxin include chronic and widespread watery diarrhea and dehydration that, in some cases, leads to death.

=== Pertussis toxin ===
This family is also known as Ptx and contains the toxin responsible for whooping cough. Pertussis toxin is secreted by the gram-negative bacterium, Bordetella pertussis. Whooping cough is very contagious and cases are slowly increasing in the United States despite vaccination. Symptoms include paroxysmal cough with whooping and even vomiting. The bacterium Bordetella pertussis was first identified as the cause of whooping cough and isolated by Jules Bordet and Octave Gengou in France in 1900. The toxin shares its mechanism with cholera toxin.

ArtAB toxin of Salmonella enterica has components similar to those found in two different families: the ArtA (Q404H4) subunit is homologous with pertussis toxin A, while the ArtB (Q404H3) subunit is homologous with subB as well as proteins found in other Salmonella strains. Under the categorize-by-A rule, it is a Ptx-family toxin.

=== Shiga toxin ===
Shiga toxin, also known as Stx, is a toxin that is produced by the rod shaped Shigella dysenteriae and Escherichia coli (STEC). Food and drinks contaminated with these bacteria are the source of infection and how this toxin is spread. Symptoms include abdominal pain as well as watery diarrhea. Severe life-threatening cases are characterized by hemorrhagic colitis (HC). The discovery of shiga toxin is credited to Dr. Kiyoshi Shiga in 1898.

=== Subtilase cytotoxin ===
This family is also known as SubAB and was discovered during the 1990s. It produced by strains of STEC that do not have the locus of enterocyte effacement (LEE), and is known to cause hemolytic-uremic syndrome (HUS). It is called a subtilase cytotoxin because its A subunit sequence is similar to that of a subtilase-like serine protease in Bacillus anthracis. Some symptoms caused by this toxin are a decrease in platelet count in the blood or thrombocytopenia, an increase in white blood cell count or leukocytosis, and renal cell damage.

The subtilase cytotoxin A subunit (subA, Q6EZC2) is a protease known to cleave binding immunoglobulin protein (BiP), leading to endoplasmic reticulum stress and cell death. The B subunits (subB, Q6EZC3) bind to N-Glycolylneuraminic acid (Neu5Gc) glycans on cells with high affinity. Just subB is sufficient to cause vacuolation of vero cells. Neu5GC is not made by humans but is acquired from food sources such as red meat and dairy products, also frequent sources of STEC infections, into the human gut lining.

== Structure ==
A complete AB5 toxin complex contains six protein units. Five units are similar or identical in structure and they comprise the B subunit. The last protein unit is unique and is known as the A subunit.

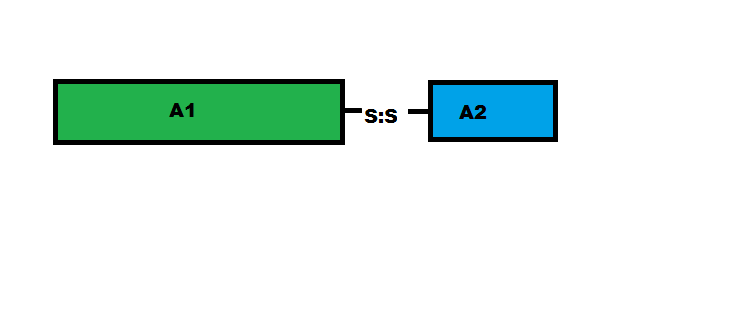
General diagram of the A subunit of the AB5 toxin with the disulfide linkage.

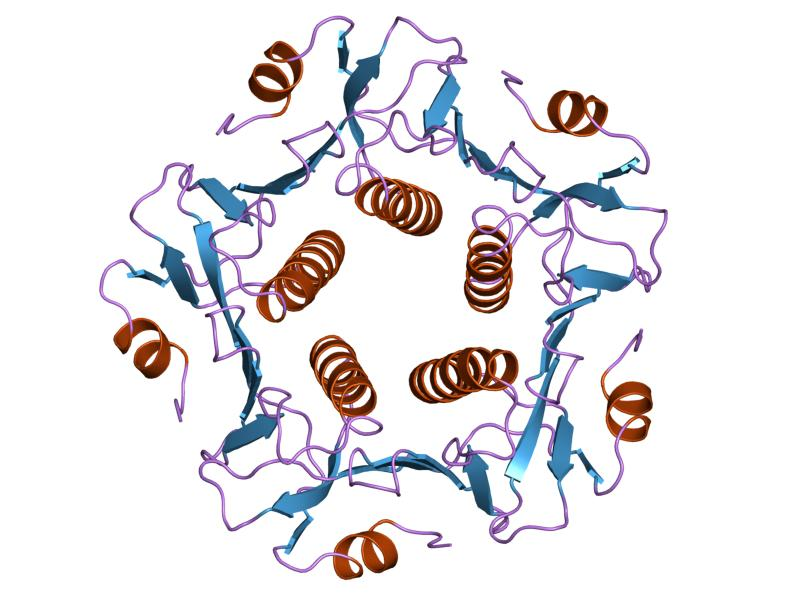
Ribbon diagram of the B-subunit of the cholera toxin.

=== A subunit ===
The A subunit of an AB5 toxin is the portion responsible for catalysis of specific targets. For Shiga toxin family, the A subunit hosts a Trypsin-sensitive region which gives out two fragmented domains when cleaved. This region has not been confirmed for the other AB5 toxin families as yet. In general, the two domains of the A subunit, named A1 and A2, are linked by a disulfide bond. Domain A1 (approximately 22kDa in cholera toxin or heat labile enterotoxins) is the part of the toxin responsible for its toxic effects. Domain A2 (approximately 5kDa in cholera toxin or heat labile enterotoxin) provides a non-covalent linkage to the B subunit through the B subunit's central pore. The A1 chain for cholera toxin catalyzes the transfer of ADP-ribose from Nicotinamide adenine dinucleotide(NAD) to arginine or other guanidine compounds by utilizing ADP-ribosylation factors (ARFs). In the absence of arginine or simple guanidino compounds, the toxin mediated NAD+ nucleosidase (NADase) activity proceeds using water as a nucleophile.

=== B subunit ===
The B subunits form a five-membered or pentameric ring, where one end of the A subunit goes into and is held. This B subunit ring is also capable of binding to a receptor, usually a glycoprotein or a glycolipid, on the surface of the host cell. Without the B subunits, the A subunit has no way of attaching to or entering the cell, and thus no way to exert its toxic effect. Cholera toxin, shiga toxin, and SubAB toxin all have B subunits that are made up of five identical protein components, meaning that their B subunits are homopentamers. Pertussis toxin is different where its pentameric ring is made up of four different protein components, where one of the components is repeated to form a heteropentamer.

== Mechanisms ==
Cholera toxin, pertussis toxin, and shiga toxin all have their targets in the cytosol of the cell. After their B subunit binds to receptors on the cell surface, the toxin is enveloped by the cell and transported inside either through clathrin-dependent endocytosis or clathrin-independent endocytosis.

The mechanism pathways for the four AB5 toxins: cholera toxin, pertussis toxin, shiga toxin, and subtilase cytotoxin.

For the cholera toxin, the principal glycolipid receptor for the cholera toxin is ganglioside GM1. After endocytosis to the Golgi apparatus, the toxin is redirected to the endoplasmic reticulum. In order for the A subunit to reach its target, a disulfide bond between the A1 and A2 domain must be broken. This breakage is catalyzed by a protein disulfide-isomerase that is in the endoplasmic reticulum. Following separation, the A1 domain unfolds and is redirected back to the cytosol where it refolds and catalyzes ADP-ribosylation of certain G protein alpha subunits. In doing so, the downstream effects of the G protein signal transduction pathway is disrupted by activating adenylate cyclase. This causes a higher concentration of cAMP in the cell, which disrupts the regulation of ion transport mechanisms.

The pertussis toxin does not have a specific receptor, and binds to sialylated glycoproteins. After endocytosis, pertussis toxin's mechanism is the same as cholera toxin.

The main receptor for the shiga toxin is globotriaosylceramide or Gb3. Shiga toxin is also brought to the golgi apparatus before being directed to the endoplasmic reticulum for PDI to cleave the disulfide bond. Shiga toxin's A subunit is then brought back into the cytosol and inhibits eukaryotic protein synthesis with its RNA N-glycosidase activity by cleaving a specific adenine base on 28S ribosomal RNA that will ultimately cause cell death.

SubAB's target is in the endoplasmic reticulum of the cell and is brought into the cell through clathrin-mediated endocytosis. The glycan receptor for SubAB usually ends with an α2-3-linked N-Glycolylneuraminic acid (Neu5Gc). SubAB has an A subunit where it acts as a serine protease and cleaves Bip/GRP78, an endoplasmic reticulum chaperone. The cleavage of this chaperone causes cellular stress through protein inhibition, and consequently death of the cell.

== Medical uses ==
=== Cancer treatment ===
B subunits of the AB5 toxins have the affinity towards binding glycan which some type of tumors seem to possess making it an easy target. One example is that of StxB which specifically binds with CD77 (Gb3) which shows expression on the surface of cancerous cells such as colon, pancreas, breast, and many more. Once StxB targets a cancerous cell, it delivers the A subunit of the toxin which eventually kills the cancerous cell.

Gastric Helicobacter pylori microcolony formation

Yet another method is by using ER stress-inducing drugs which have been tested in mice to show positive synergistic responses. This is accomplished through fusion of epidermal growth factor (EGF) with SubAB's A subunit. Cancer cells that express receptors for EGF will then experience SubAB toxicity.

=== Vaccines ===
Another use of AB5 toxins is using members of the LT family as adjuvants. This allows the toxin to promote immunological responses such as IgG2a, IgA, and Th17 to fight for instance gastric Helicobacter pylori infection when a vaccine is given.

In addition to some of these AB5 toxins being used to create vaccines to prevent bacterial infection, they are also being researched to work as a conjugate to prevent viral infections. For example, systemic immunization along with co-administered intra-nasal delivery of virus-cholera toxin conjugate vaccine induced a virus-specific antibody response and showed some degree of protection to the upper respiratory tract from Sendai virus.

== Recent areas of research ==
New advancements in biotechnological experimental methods such as the use of Bessel beam plane illumination microscopy and FRET-based sensor molecules can better demonstrate dynamic structures of gap junction plaques. For these experiments, different types of AB5 toxins can be used to induce the fast formation of tCDR in E.Coli cells. The response can then be recorded using cAMP concentration fluctuations in gap junction-coupled cells using FRET-based sensor constructs. Research suggests that CDRs could perhaps be linked with rapid rearrangement of lipids and protein in connexin channels within the gap junction plaques. This can further help us understand the signaling cascade that follows a cellular loss of K+ when exposed to bacterial infection.

The SubAB toxin has been seen to demonstrate specificity to a binding protein, BiP. This characteristic has been utilized to study the role of the cellular BiP itself, along with Endoplasmic-reticulum-associated degradation in stressed HeLa cells.

== See also ==
- AB5 Toxins Biochemistry
- Cholera toxin
- Pertussis toxin
- Shiga toxin
- Subtilase
