= Diseases and epidemics of the 19th century =

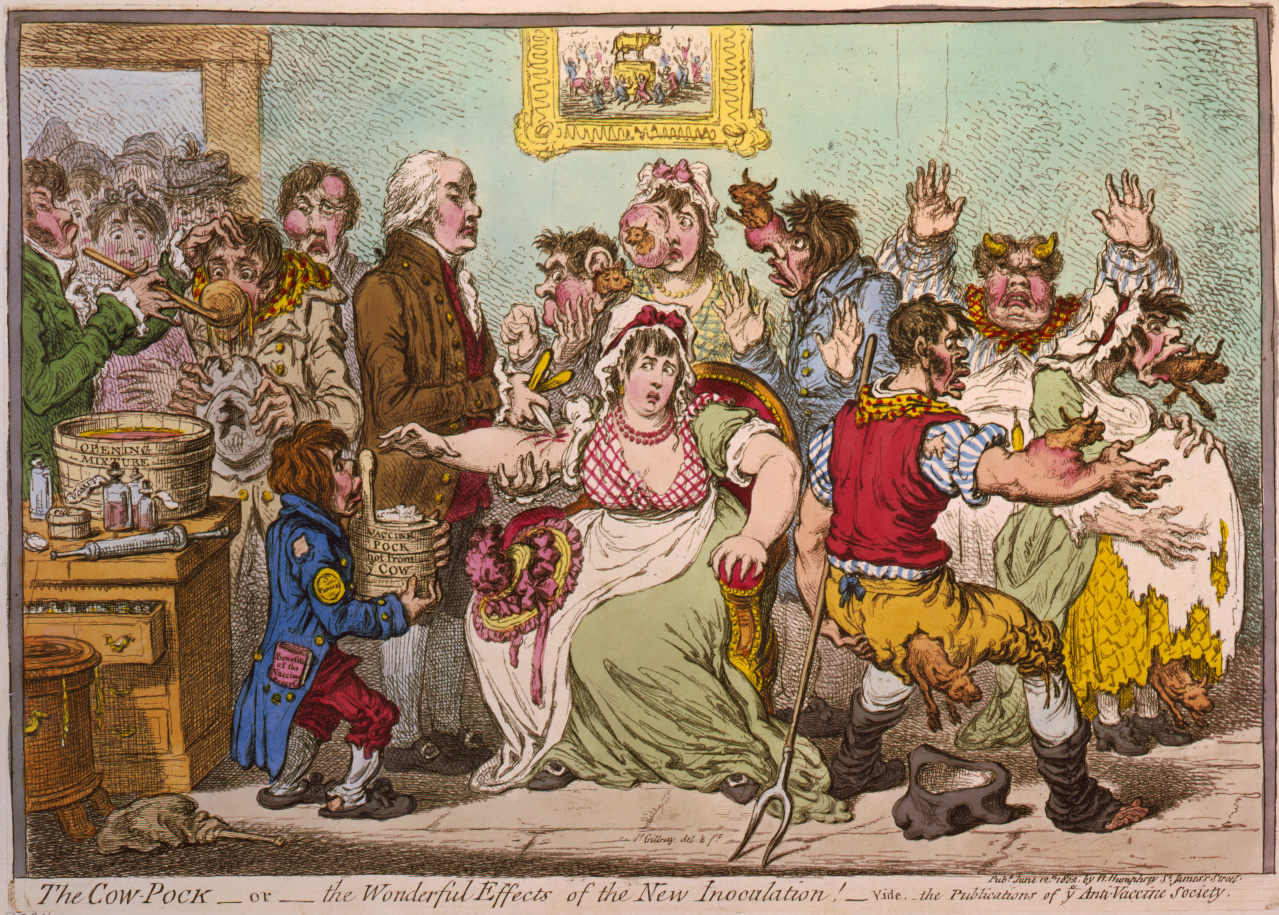
An 1802 cartoon of Edward Jenner's cowpox-derived smallpox vaccine

Diseases and epidemics of the 19th century included long-standing epidemic threats such as smallpox, typhus, yellow fever, and scarlet fever. In addition, cholera emerged as an epidemic threat and spread worldwide in six pandemics in the nineteenth century.

== Medical responses ==
=== Medicine in the 19th century ===
Epidemics of the 19th century were faced without the medical advances that made 20th-century epidemics much rarer and less lethal. Micro-organisms (viruses and bacteria) had been discovered in the 18th century, but it was not until the late 19th century that the experiments of Lazzaro Spallanzani and Louis Pasteur disproved spontaneous generation conclusively, allowing germ theory and Robert Koch's discovery of micro-organisms as the cause of disease transmission. Thus throughout the majority of the 19th century, there was only the most basic, common-sense understanding of the causes, amelioration, and treatment of epidemic disease.

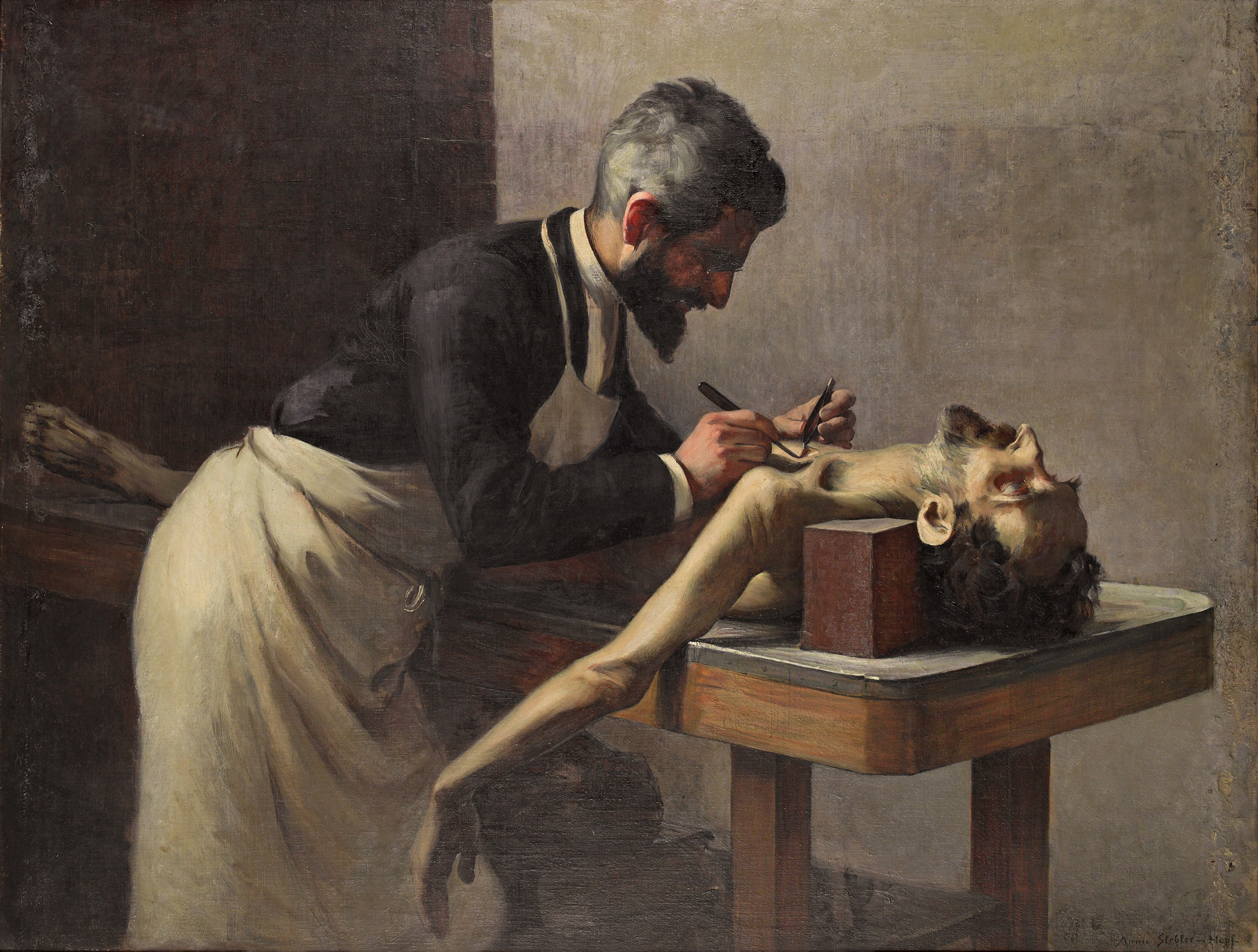
Medical advancements in the practice of autopsy helped lead to a better understanding of how the body works and what were the functions of various body parts.

The 19th century did, however, mark a transformation period in medicine. This included the first uses of chloroform and nitrous dioxides as anesthesia, important discoveries in regards of pathology and the perfection of the autopsy, and advances in our understanding of the human body. Medical institutions were also transitioning to new hospital styles to try to prevent the spread of disease and stop over crowding with the mixing of the poor and the sick which had been a common practice. With the increasing rise in urban population, disease and epidemic crisis became much more prevalent and was seen as a consequence of urban living. Problems arose as both governments and the medical professionals at the time tried to get a handle on the spread of disease. They had yet to figure out what actually causes disease. So as those in authority scrambled to make leaps and bounds in science and track down what may be the cause of these epidemics, entire communities would be lost to the grips of terrible ailments.

=== Exploring potential cures ===
During these many outbreaks, members of the medical profession rapidly began trying different cures to treat their patients. During the cholera epidemic of 1832, a doctor in London, Thomas Latta, discovered that he could greatly increase the survival rate of his patients by injecting saline solutions into their arms. However, due to the wide range of medicines being touted as cures and treatments, his technique failed to gain widespread adoption. Many other medical discoveries made in the 19th century failed to gain traction for similar reasons. With the increasing circulation of mass media and little content review in medical journals, almost anyone with or without proper education could publish a potential cure for disease. Actual practicing medical professionals also had to compete with the ever expanding pharmacy companies that were all too ready to provide new elixirs and promising treatments for the epidemics of the time.

Emerging from the medical chaos were legitimate and life changing treatments. The late 19th century was the beginning of widespread use of vaccines. The cholera bacterium was isolated in 1854 by Italian anatomist Filippo Pacini, and a vaccine, the first to immunize humans against a bacterial disease, was developed by Spanish physician Jaume Ferran i Clua in 1885, and by Russian–Jewish bacteriologist Waldemar Haffkine in July 1892.

Antibiotic drugs did not appear until the middle of the 20th century. Sulfonamides did not appear until 1935, and penicillin, discovered in 1928, was not able to be purified in large quantities until 1940 and was first used to treat a patient in 1941.

A big response and potential cure to these epidemics were better sanitation in the cities. Sanitation prior to this was very poor and sometimes attempts to get better sanitation often exacerbated the diseases, especially during the cholera epidemics because their understanding of diseases relied on the miasma (bad air) theory. During the first cholera epidemic, Edwin Chadwick made an inquiry into sanitation and used quantitative data to link poor living conditions and disease and low life expectancy. As a result, the Board of Health in London took measure to improve drainage and ventilation around the city. Unfortunately, the measures helped clean the city but it further contaminated the River Thames (the primary drinking water for the city) and the epidemic got worse.

=== Beliefs about the causes ===
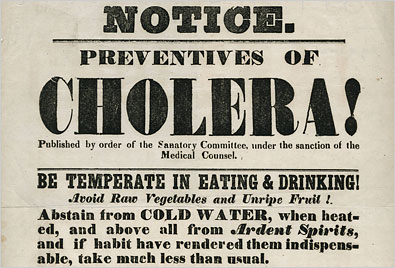
Hand bill from the New York City Board of Health, 1832 – the outdated public health advice demonstrates the lack of understanding of the disease and its actual causative factors

During the second cholera pandemic of 1826–1837, the scientific community varied in its beliefs about its causes. In France, doctors believed cholera was associated with the poverty of certain communities or poor environment. Russians believed the disease was contagious and quarantined their citizens. The United States believed that cholera was brought by recent immigrants, specifically the Irish. Lastly, some British thought the disease might arise from divine intervention.

During the third pandemic, Tunisia, which had not been affected by the two previous pandemics, thought Europeans had brought the disease. They blamed their sanitation practices. The prevalence of the disease in the South in areas of black populations convinced United States scientists that cholera was associated with African Americans. Current researchers note they lived near the waterways by which travelers and ships carried the disease and their populations were underserved with sanitation infrastructure and health care.

The Soho outbreak in London in 1854 ended after the physician John Snow identified a neighborhood Broad Street pump as contaminated and convinced officials to remove its handle. Snow believed that germ-contaminated water was the source of cholera, rather than particles in the air (referred to as "miasmata"). His study proved contaminated water was the main agent spreading cholera, although he did not identify the contaminant. Though Filippo Pacini had isolated Vibrio cholerae as the causative agent for cholera that year, it would be many years before miasma theory would fall out of favor.

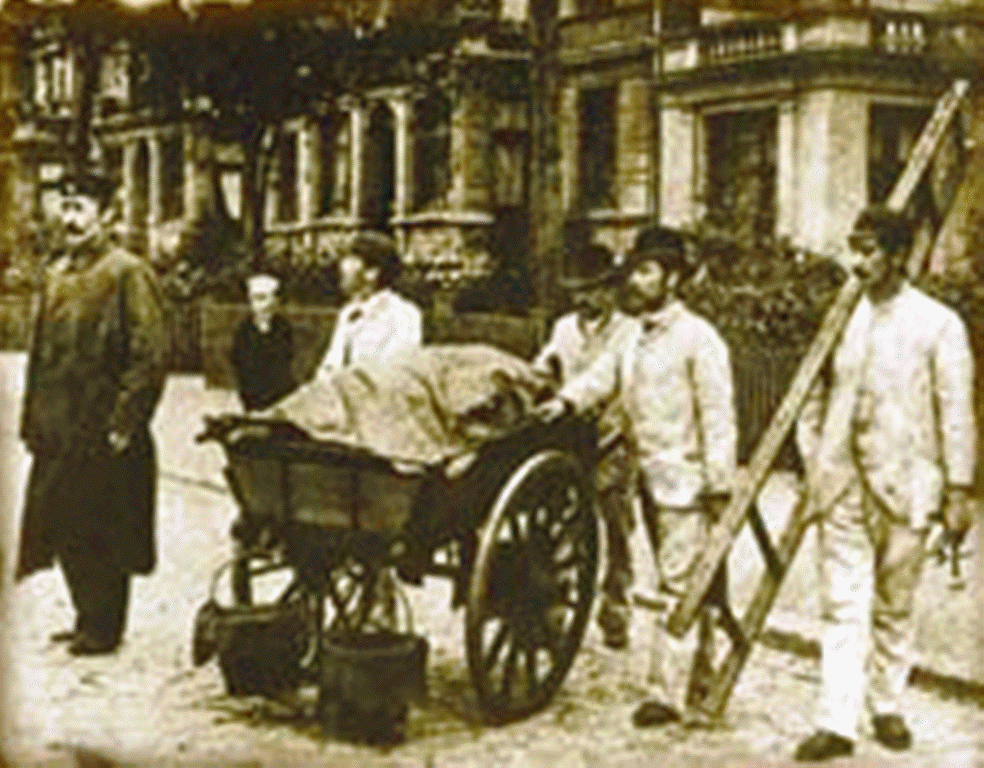
Disinfection team in the 1892 cholera outbreak in Hamburg

In London, in June 1866), a localized epidemic in the East End claimed 5,596 lives, just as the city was completing construction of its major sewage and water treatment systems. William Farr, using the work of John Snow, et al., as to contaminated drinking water being the likely source of the disease, relatively quickly identified the East London Water Company as the source of the contaminated water. Quick action prevented further deaths.

During the fifth cholera pandemic, Robert Koch isolated Vibrio cholerae and proposed postulates to explain how bacteria caused disease. His work helped to establish the germ theory of disease. Prior to this time, many physicians believed that microorganisms were spontaneously generated, and disease was caused by direct exposure to filth and decay. Koch helped establish that the disease was more specifically contagious and was transmittable through the contaminated water supply. The fifth was the last serious European cholera outbreak, as cities improved their sanitation and water systems.

== Cholera ==
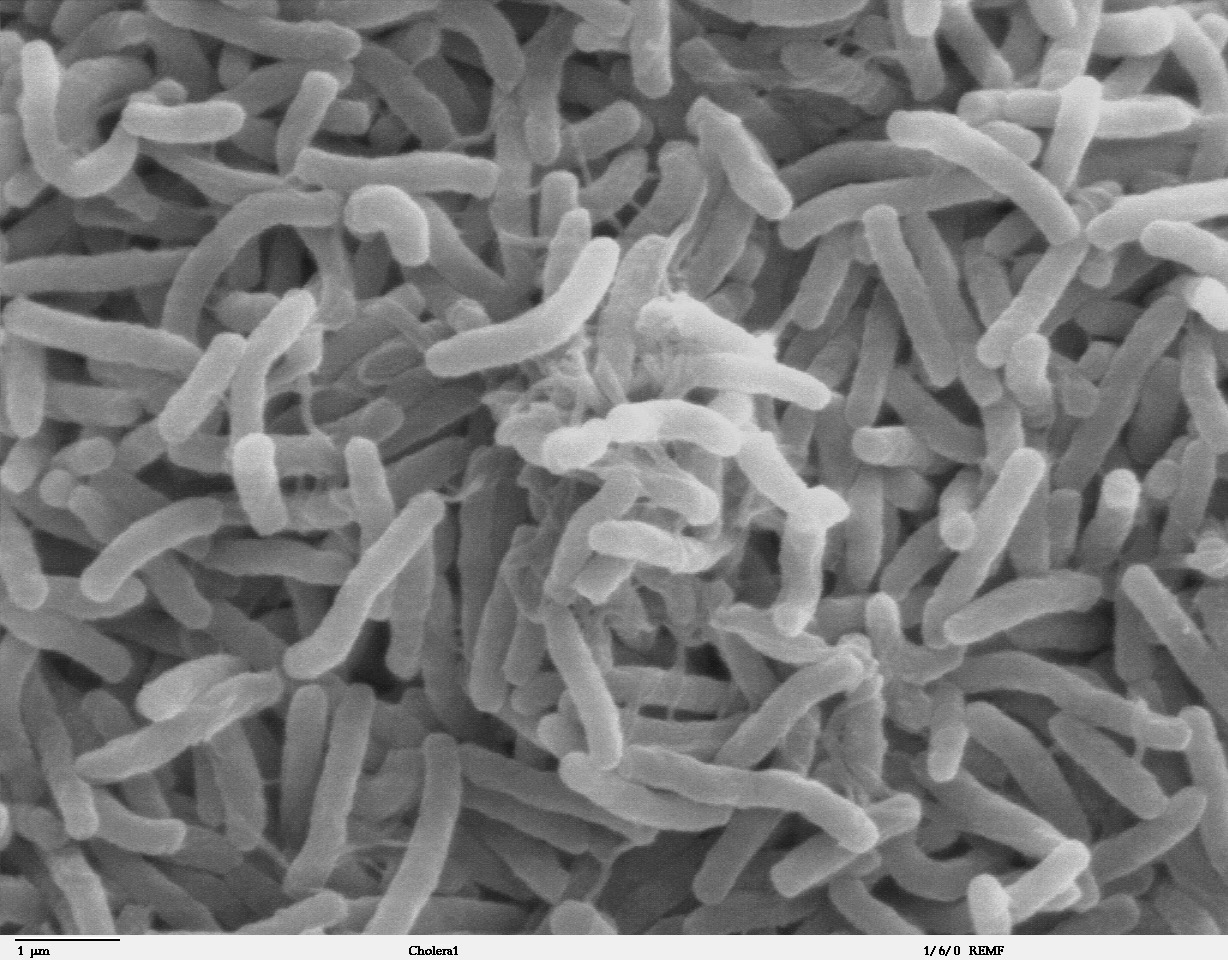
Cholera bacteria

Cholera is an infection of the small intestine caused by the bacterium Vibrio cholerae. Cholera is transmitted primarily by drinking water or eating food that has been contaminated by the cholera bacterium. The bacteria multiply in the small intestine; the feces (waste product) of an infected person, including one with no apparent symptoms, can pass on the disease if it contacts the water supply by any means.

History does not recount any incidents of cholera until the 19th century. Cholera came in seven waves, the last two of which occurred in the 20th century.

The first cholera pandemic started in 1816, spread across India by 1820, and extended to Southeast Asia and Central Europe, lasting until 1826.

A second cholera pandemic began in 1829, reached Russia, causing the Cholera riots. It spread to Hungary, Germany and Egypt in 1831, and London, Paris, Quebec, Ontario and New York City the following year. Cholera reached the Pacific coast of North America by 1834, reaching into the center of the country by steamboat and other river traffic.

The third cholera pandemic began in 1846 and lasted until 1860. It hit Russia hardest, with over one million deaths. In 1846, cholera struck Mecca, killing over 15,000. A two-year outbreak began in England and Wales in 1848, and claimed 52,000 lives. In 1849, outbreak occurred again in Paris, and in London, killing 14,137, over twice as many as the 1832 outbreak. Cholera hit Ireland in 1849 and killed many of the Irish Famine survivors, already weakened by starvation and fever. In 1849, cholera claimed 5,308 lives in the major port city of Liverpool, England, an embarkation point for immigrants to North America, and 1,834 in Hull, England. Cholera spread throughout the Mississippi River system. Thousands died in New York City, a major destination for Irish immigrants. Cholera killed 200,000 people in Mexico. That year, cholera was transmitted along the California, Mormon and Oregon Trails, killing people that are believed to have died on their way to the California Gold Rush, Utah and Oregon in the cholera years of 1849–55. In 1851, a ship coming from Cuba carried the disease to Gran Canaria, killing up to 6,000 people.

The pandemic spread east to Indonesia by 1852, and China and Japan in 1854. The Philippines were infected in 1858 and Korea in 1859. In 1859, an outbreak in Bengal contributed to transmission of the disease by travelers and troops to Iran, Iraq, Arabia and Russia. Japan suffered at least seven major outbreaks of cholera between 1858 and 1902. The Ansei outbreak of 1858–60, for example, is believed to have killed between 100,000 and 200,000 people in Tokyo alone. An outbreak of cholera in Chicago in 1854 took the lives of 5.5% of the population (about 3,500 people). In 1853–54, London's epidemic claimed 10,738 lives. Throughout Spain, cholera caused more than 236,000 deaths in 1854–55. In 1854, it entered Venezuela; Brazil also suffered in 1855.

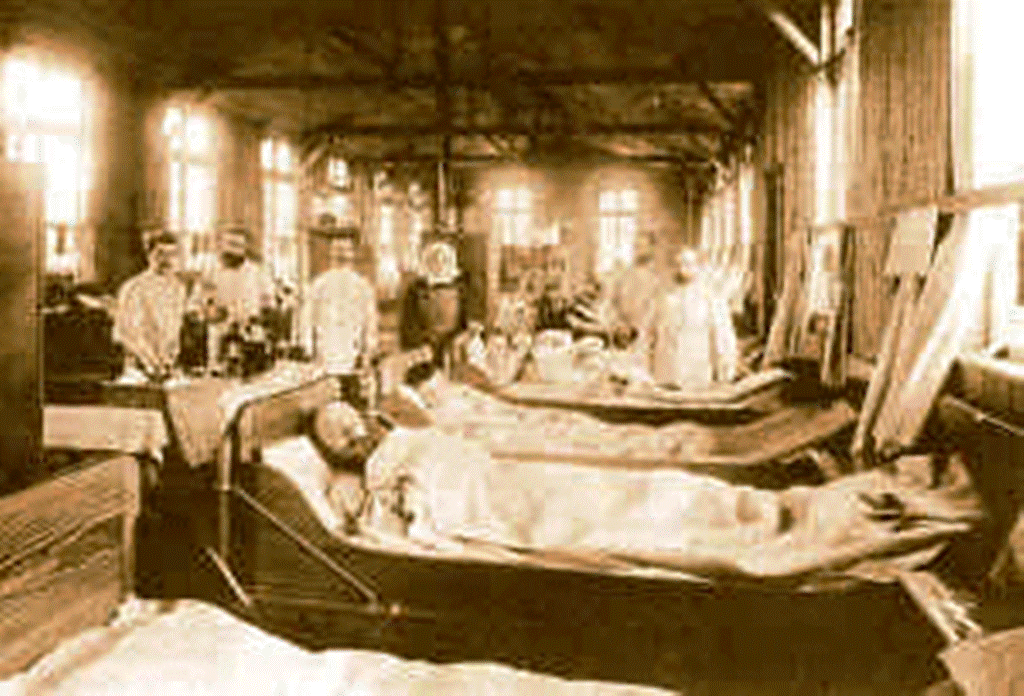
1892 cholera outbreak in Hamburg, hospital ward

The fourth cholera pandemic (1863–1875) spread mostly in Europe and Africa. At least 30,000 of the 90,000 Mecca pilgrims died from the disease. Cholera ravaged northern Africa in 1865 and southeastward to Zanzibar, killing 70,000 in 1869–70. Cholera claimed 90,000 lives in Russia in 1866. The epidemic of cholera that spread with the Austro-Prussian War (1866) is estimated to have killed 165,000 people in the Austrian Empire. In 1867, 113,000 died from cholera in Italy. and 80,000 in Algeria.

Outbreaks in North America in 1866–1873 killed some 50,000 Americans. In 1866, localized epidemics occurred in the East End of London, in southern Wales, and Amsterdam. In the 1870s, cholera spread in the U.S. as an epidemic from New Orleans along the Mississippi River and to ports on its tributaries.

In the fifth cholera pandemic (1881–1896), according to Dr A. J. Wall, the 1883–1887 part of the epidemic cost 250,000 lives in Europe and at least 50,000 in the Americas. Cholera claimed 267,890 lives in Russia (1892); 120,000 in Spain; 90,000 in Japan and over 60,000 in Persia. In Egypt, cholera claimed more than 58,000 lives. The 1892 outbreak in Hamburg killed 8,600 people.

== Smallpox ==
Smallpox is caused by either of the two viruses, Variola major and Variola minor. Smallpox vaccine was available in Europe, the United States, and the Spanish Colonies during the last part of the century. The Latin names of this disease are Variola Vera. The words come from various (spotted) or varus (pimple). In England, this disease was first known as the "pox" or the "red plague". Smallpox settles itself in small blood vessels of the skin and in the mouth and throat. The symptoms of smallpox are rash on the skin and blisters filled with raised liquid.

The disease killed an estimated 400,000 Europeans annually during the 19th century and one-third of all the blindness of that time was caused by smallpox. 20 to 60% of all the people that were infected died and 80% of all the children with the infection also died. It caused also many deaths in the 20th century, over 300–500 million. Wolfgang Amadeus Mozart also had smallpox when he was only 11 years old. He survived the smallpox outbreak in Austria.

== Typhus ==
Epidemic typhus is caused by the bacteria Rickettsia Prowazekii; it comes from lice. Murine typhus is caused by the Rickettsia Typhi bacteria, from the fleas on rats. Scrub typhus is caused by the Orientia Tsutsugamushi bacteria, from the harvest mites on humans and rodents. Queensland tick typhus is caused by the Rickettsia Australis bacteria, from ticks.

During Napoleon's retreat from Moscow in 1812, more French soldiers died of typhus than were killed by the Russians. A major epidemic occurred in Ireland between 1816 and 1819, during the Year Without a Summer; an estimated 100,000 Irish perished. Typhus appeared again in the late 1830s, and between 1846 and 1849 during the Great Irish Famine. Spreading to England, and called "Irish fever", it was noted for its virulence. It killed people of all social classes, as lice were endemic and inescapable, but it hit particularly hard in the lower or "unwashed" social strata. In Canada alone, the typhus epidemic of 1847 killed more than 20,000 people from 1847 to 1848, mainly Irish immigrants in fever sheds and other forms of quarantine, who had contracted the disease aboard coffin ships. In the United States, epidemics occurred in Baltimore, Memphis and Washington DC between 1865 and 1873, and during the American Civil War.

== Yellow fever ==
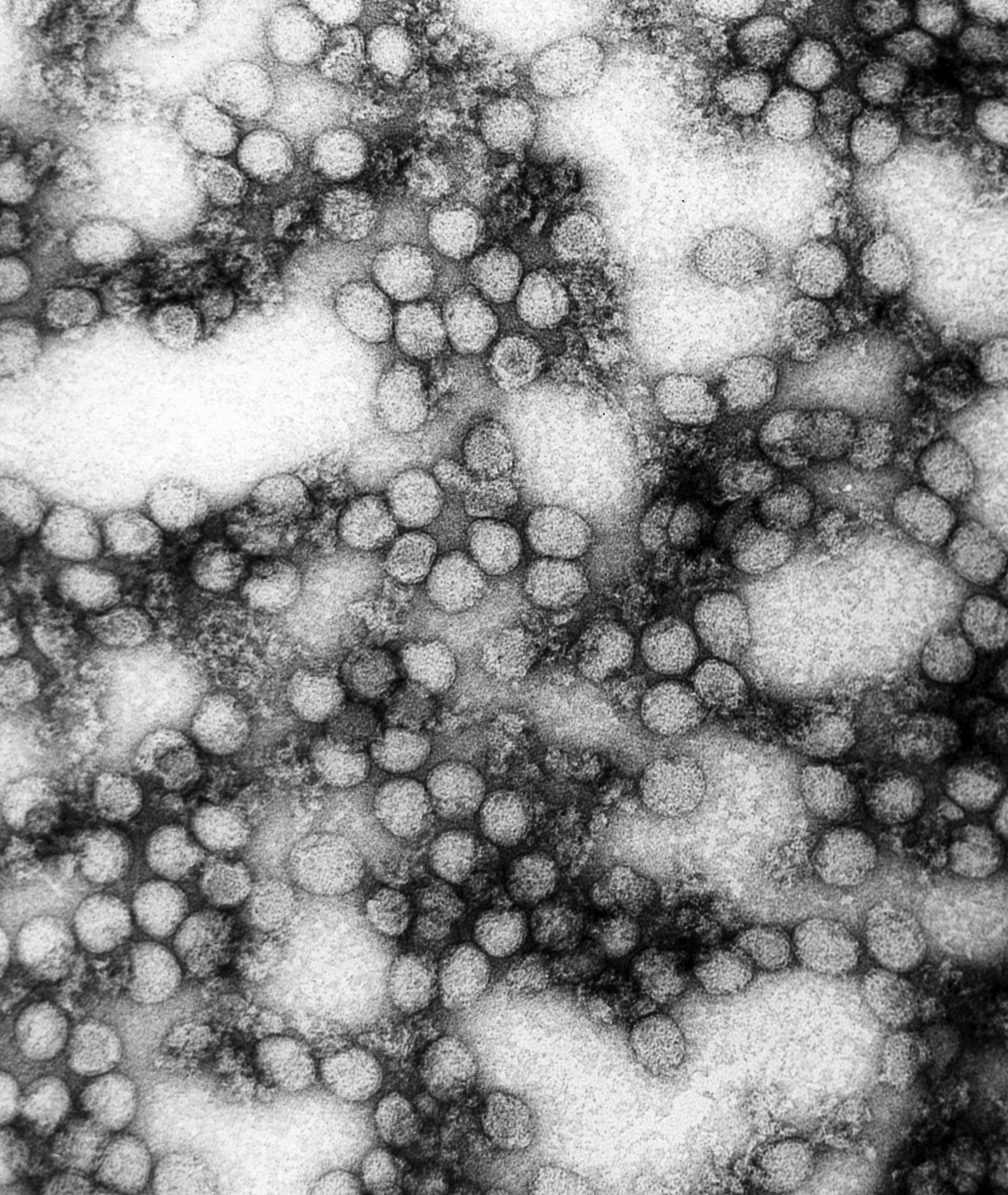
Yellow fever virus

This disease is transmitted by the bite of female mosquito; the higher prevalence of transmission by Aedes aegypti has led to it being known as the Yellow Fever Mosquito. The transmission of yellow fever is entirely a matter of available habitat for vector mosquito and prevention such as mosquito netting. They mostly infect other primates, but humans can be infected. The symptoms of the fever are: Headaches, back and muscle pain, chills and vomiting, bleeding in the eyes and mouth, and vomit containing blood.

Yellow fever accounted for the largest number of the 19th-century's individual epidemic outbreaks, and most of the recorded serious outbreaks of yellow fever occurred in the 19th century. It is most prevalent in tropical-like climates, but the United States was not exempted from the fever. New Orleans was plagued with major epidemics during the 19th century, most notably in 1833 and 1853. At least 25 major outbreaks took place in the Americas during the 18th and 19th centuries, including particularly serious ones in Santo Domingo in 1803 and Memphis in 1878. Major outbreaks occurred repeatedly in Gibraltar; outbreaks in 1804, 1814, and again in 1828. Barcelona suffered the loss of several thousand citizens during an outbreak in 1821. Urban epidemics continued in the United States until 1905, with the last outbreak affecting New Orleans.

== Plague ==
The third plague pandemic was a major bubonic plague pandemic that began in Yunnan, China in 1855. This episode of bubonic plague spread to all inhabited continents in the 1890s and first years of the 1900s, and ultimately led to more than 12,000,000 deaths in India and China, with about 10,000,000 killed in India alone.

A natural reservoir of plague is located in western Yunnan and is an ongoing health risk today. The third pandemic of plague originated in this area after a rapid influx of Han Chinese to exploit the demand for minerals, primarily copper, in the latter half of the 19th century. By 1850, the population had exploded to over 7,000,000 people. Increasing transportation throughout the region brought people in contact with plague-infected fleas, the primary vector between the yellow-breasted rat (Rattus flavipectus) and humans. The spread of European empires and the development of new forms of transport such as the steam engine made it easier for both humans and rats to spread the disease along existing trade routes.

== Scarlet fever ==
Haemolytic streptococcus, which was identified in the 1880s, causes scarlet fever, which is a bacterial disease. Scarlet fever spreads through respiratory droplets and children between the ages of 5 and 15 years were most affected by scarlet fever. Scarlet fever had several epidemic phases, and around 1825 to 1885 outbreaks began to recur cyclically and often highly fatal. In the mid-19th century, the mortality caused by scarlet fever rose in England and Wales. The major outbreak in England and Wales took place during 1825–1885 with high mortality marking this as remarkable. There were several other notable outbreaks across Europe, South America, and the United States in the 19th century.

=== United Kingdom ===
In the UK, scarlet fever was considered benign for two centuries, but there were fatal epidemics in the 18th century. Scarlet fever broke out in England in the 19th century and was responsible for an enormous number of deaths in the 60-year period from 1825 to 1885; decades that followed had lower levels of annual mortality from scarlet fever.

In North West England there was heavy mortality in Liverpool. Babies born in Liverpool with a birthday in 1861 were only expected to live 26 years, and in larger cities, life expectancy was less than 35 years. Over time, the life expectancy changed as well as the number of fatalities from scarlet fever. There was a reduction in child mortality from scarlet fever when comparing the decades of 1851–60 and 1891–1900. The decline of mortality seen for scarlet fever was noticed after the identification of streptococcus, but the decline was not associated with a treatment.

A treatment would not be available until the introduction of sulphonamides in the 1930s, and the decline in mortality was due to the quality of air, food, and water improving. Outbreaks of scarlet fever also took place in Dublin in 1896 with 1,354 cases and 149 deaths, Norway from 1862 to 1884, Scotland in 1861, and in the rest of United Kingdom. The United Kingdom saw cases in Canterbury from 1839 to 1865 with 305 deaths, Bristol in 1870 with 106 deaths and in 1875, and Manchester in 1886 with six cases.

=== South America ===
Chile reported scarlet fever the first time in 1827 and highest rates were seen during winter months. The disease spread from Valparaiso to Santiago from 1831 to 1832 and claimed 7,000 lives. There were multiple outbreaks in different locations of Chile, including Copaipo in 1875 and Caldera in 1876.

=== United States ===
Similarly to Europe, America considered scarlet fever to be benign for two centuries. In the early 19th century the scarlet fever impact drastically changed and lethal epidemics started to arise in the United States. The United States had a notable outbreak of scarlet fever in Minnesota in 1847 and Augusta, Georgia had a lethal epidemic in 1832–33. Scarlet fever had low mortality rates in New York for many years before 1828, but remained high for long after. Cases of scarlet fever were also seen in Boston during a period of decreasing severity after 1885. Boston City Hospital opened a scarlet fever pavilion in 1887 to house patients with infectious diseases and saw nearly 25,000 patients during 1895–1905.

In the mid-19th century, more specific epidemiological information was emerging and incidence in infants were found to be low. In 1870, the US census showed a decrease in scarlet fever mortality in children below the age of one.
