= Cholera toxin =

Bacteria-produced protein complex and disease agent

Cholera toxin subunit A

Identifiers
- Symbol: ctxA
- CAS number: 9012-63-9
- NCBI gene: 944742
- PDB: 1S5B
- RefSeq: WP_001889387.1
- UniProt: P01555

Other data
- EC number: 2.4.2.36
- Wikidata: Q189245
Search for
- Structures: Swiss-model
- Domains: InterPro

Cholera toxin subunit B
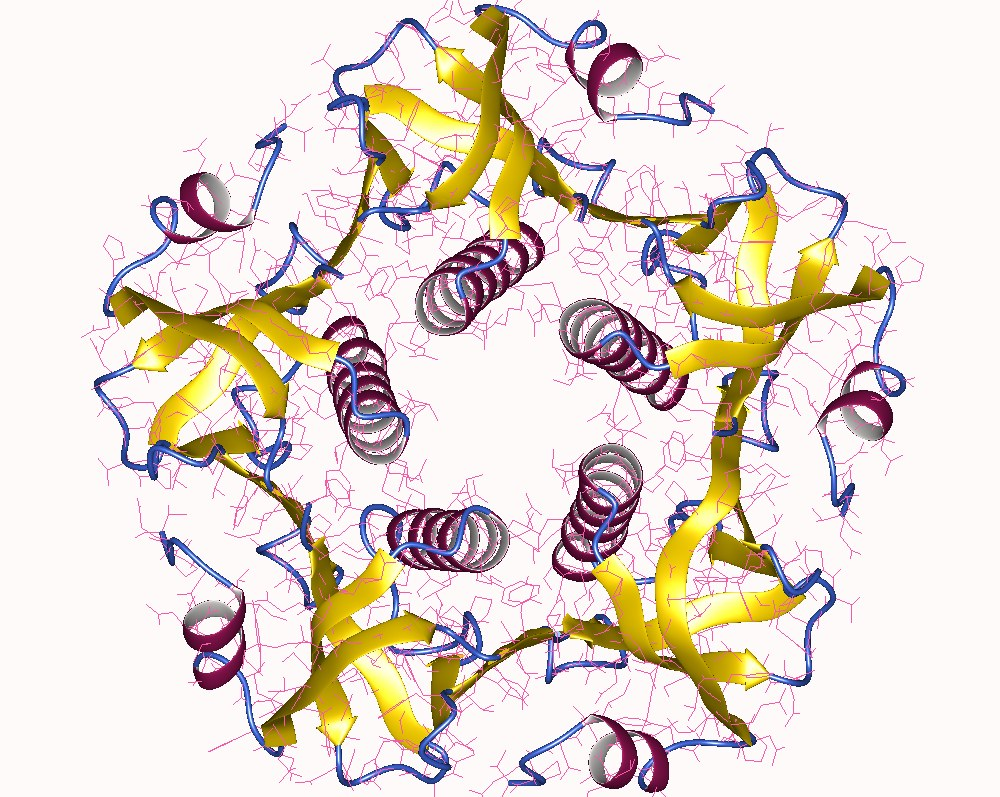
- 3D structure of cholera toxin subunit B. (top view with CTA subunit removed)

Identifiers
- Symbol: ctxB
- CAS number: 9012-63-9
- NCBI gene: 944741
- PDB: 1CHP
- RefSeq: WP_000987577.1
- UniProt: P01556

Other data
- EC number: 2.4.2.36
- Wikidata: Q189245
Search for
- Structures: Swiss-model
- Domains: InterPro

Cholera toxin (also known as choleragen, CTX, CTx and CT) is a potent enterotoxin produced by the bacterium Vibrio cholerae which causes severe watery diarrhea and dehydration that define cholera infections. The toxin is a member of the heat-labile enterotoxin family, and exists as an AB5 multimeric toxin with one enzymatically-active A subunit and five receptor-binding B subunits that facilitate host cell entry.

== History ==
The production of cholera toxin by Vibrio cholerae is the pathogenic agent of the ancient disease cholera, originally found in Asia and Europe. The first modern global pandemic emerged in the Ganges Delta in 1817. Globalization that was developing in the nineteenth century spread it worldwide through the course of seven subsequent pandemics. When cholera arrived in London in 1832, its transmission was poorly understood, with many blaming miasma. A physician, John Snow (1813–1858), was an advocate of water contamination as the cause of its spread—famously ending an outbreak by removing a public water pump handle in central London. His theory however only gained acceptance years after his death, through the discovery of the cholera bacterium.

=== Discovery and isolation ===
The discovery of the cholera toxin has widely been accredited to Robert Koch, a physician and microbiologist. In 1886, Koch hypothesised that Vibrio cholerae produced a substance that caused cholera symptoms. Isolation of the bacteria had already been conducted 30 years earlier by Italian anatomist Filippo Pacini, who had subsequently published his work in his native language.

In 1951, Sambhu Nath De confirmed Koch's hypothesis, through De's research that involved injecting heat-killed V. cholerae into rabbits. From this experiment he determined that an endotoxin is released as the bacteria disintegrate, and that this endotoxin is responsible for the disease symptoms. Then, in 1959, De performed a follow-up experiment, injecting bacteria-free culture filtrate of V. cholerae into the rabbit's small intestine and thereby proving the existence of the toxin by the fluid accumulation.

=== Purification and mechanism ===
The next decade saw Richard Finkelstein's research team successfully isolate and purify the cholera toxin (CT). This research identified the holotoxin (AB_{5}) as the primary active agent, whereas the B_{5} oligomer lacked intrinsic toxicity but played a key role in triggering cholera symptoms. Subsequent biochemical methods confirmed the complex subunit structure of the toxin, leading to comprehensive understanding of its mechanisms.

Another significant landmark occurred in 1973 when King and van Heyningen identified the GM1 ganglioside as the CT receptor. Their experiments revealed that GM1 blocked the toxin's ability to enhance capillary permeability in rabbit skin, preventing fluid accumulation in ligated rabbit intestinal loops. Additionally, they discovered that the receptor obstructed its effect on the adenylyl cyclase pathway in guinea pig intestinal tissue. These findings would come to aid in future pursuits of medical applications of the toxin, through increasingly detailed knowledge of its effects.

=== Modern relevance ===
Modern sanitation facilities have almost completely removed cholera from industrialized nations, in contrast to economically-disadvantaged regions where the disease claims over 100,000 annual deaths. The disease primarily targets people who live in areas with inadequate water sanitation, ongoing conflicts, and restricted healthcare access. A prominent example is the 2010 Haiti earthquake, which caused the worst cholera epidemic in 25 years, after a 10-month lag period.

There are over 200 recorded serogroups of V. cholerae, of which only serogroups O1 and O139 lead to epidemic sickness, whereas serotypes that cause sporadic outbreaks are termed non-O1/non-O139 V. cholerae. Serogroup O1 has two distinct strains, namely El Tor and Classical, and has been the reason for all seven pandemics. El Tor (strain16961) extensively replaced the Classical strain during the start of the seventh pandemic in the 1960s. Serogroup O139 appeared in 1992, and remains prevalent as of 2015.

=== Clinical and public health impact ===
Cholera becomes fatal within hours when left untreated. The World Health Organization reported more than 730,000 cases and 5,100 deaths in 33 countries from January through November 2024. Increased vaccine production has not solved an ongoing shortage of oral cholera vaccines, which hampers preventive vaccination programs. Research indicates that endemic countries experience 2.9 million cholera cases, but official records probably underestimate the actual number of cases. The numbers demonstrate the toxin's dual role in making cholera both a critical medical condition and a significant public health concern.

== Structure ==
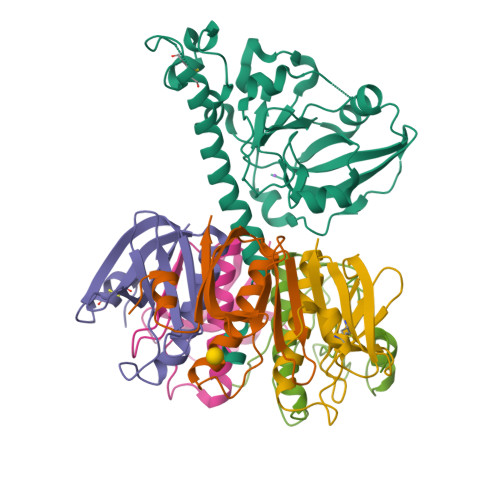
3D structure of the cholera toxin. The green region at the top represents the enzymatically-active A subunit (ctxA), while the multicoloured region forming a ring at the bottom represents the pentameric B subunit (ctxB) responsible for host cell binding.

Cholera toxin is a classical AB_{5}-type hexameric protein composed of one enzymatically-active A subunit and five identical receptor-binding B subunits. This structure closely resembles the heat-labile enterotoxin (LT) produced by Escherichia coli, and its notable sequence and functional similarities confirm its shared membership in the AB_{5} toxin family.

The A subunit (UniProt: P01555) contains 240 amino acids and weighs approximately 28 kDa. It is proteolytically cleaved into two distinct domains: CTA1 (~22 kDa), the enzymatically-active globular domain, and CTA2 (~5.5 kDa), a long alpha helix that tethers CTA1 to the B subunit ring.

These domains are connected via disulfide bond between Cys187 and Cys199. The CTA1 domain catalyzes the ADP-ribosylation of Arg201 on the Gsα subunit of heterotrimeric G proteins. This locks adenylyl cyclase in an active state, elevating cAMP levels and triggering the characteristic fluid secretion seen in cholera. The catalytic residue within CTA1 is Glu112, located in a wedge-shaped fold made up of two β-sheets and several helices.

The CTA2 domain passes through the central pore of the B subunit pentamer and ends in a KDEL sequence (Lys-Asp-Glu-Leu), which facilitates endoplasmic reticulum (ER) retention during retrograde transport, although it is not strictly essential for trafficking. For CTA1 to translocate to the cytosol and become active, the disulfide bond must be reduced in the ER. CTA1 then undergoes partial unfolding and hijacks the ER-associated degradation (ERAD) pathway for export into the cytosol. Its low lysine content helps it avoid ubiquitination and degradation, allowing it to refold and exert toxicity.

Each B subunit (UniProt: P01556) consists of 103 amino acids and weighs approximately 11 kDa after signal peptide cleavage. The five B subunits form a doughnut-shaped pentameric ring that specifically binds to GM1 ganglioside receptors on the surface of intestinal epithelial cells. Binding is enhanced by cooperativity among subunits, which facilitates endocytosis and subsequent retrograde transport through the Golgi apparatus and ER.

The three-dimensional structure of the holotoxin was determined in 1995 by Zhang et al. using X-ray crystallography at 2.5 Å resolution (PDB: 1XTC') The Hol group determined it again at 1.9 Å resolution, yielding a much improved geometry compared to the first structure determination.

== Pathogenesis ==
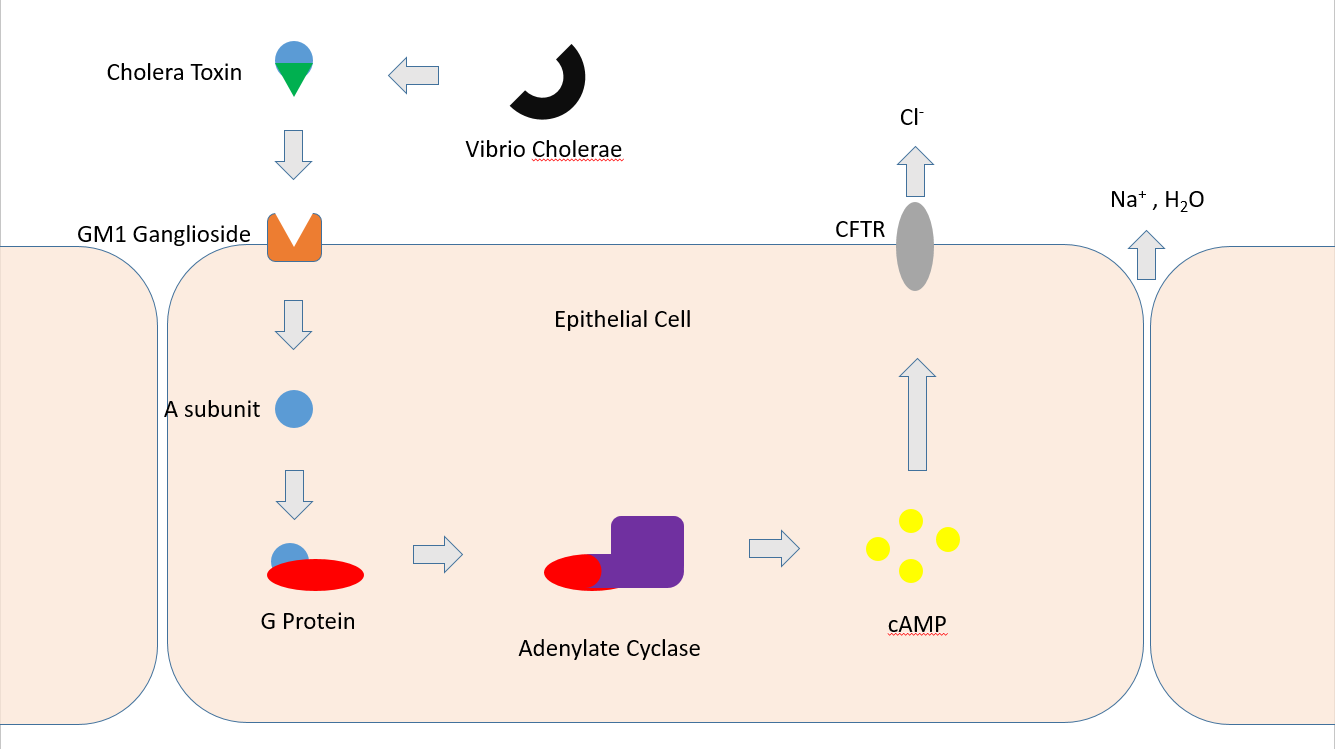
Cholera toxin mechanism

Cholera toxin (CT) initiates its toxic effects by binding to GM1 ganglioside receptors on the surface of intestinal epithelial cells via its B subunit pentamer. If GM1 is absent or scarce, CT can interact with alternative fucosylated glycoconjugates, such as Lewis X and Lewis Y antigens, expanding its host binding capacity.

Once bound, the entire holotoxin is endocytosed and undergoes retrograde trafficking through the Golgi apparatus to the endoplasmic reticulum (ER). In the ER, the A subunit (CTXA) is cleaved by proteases into CTA1 and CTA2, which remain linked by a disulfide bond between Cys187 and Cys199. The ER-resident oxidoreductase protein disulfide isomerase (PDI), with assistance from Ero1, reduces this bond, releasing the catalytically active CTA1 domain.

CTA1 partially unfolds and exploits the ER-associated degradation (ERAD) pathway to translocate into the cytosol through the Sec61 translocon. Unlike typical ERAD substrates, CTA1 evades ubiquitination due to its low lysine content, allowing it to refold in the cytosol rather than be degraded by the proteasome.

CTA1 binds to ARF6-GTP (ADP-ribosylation factor 6) in the cytosol, which induces a conformational change that exposes its active site. CTA1 then catalyses the ADP-ribosylation of Arg201 on the Gαs subunit of heterotrimeric G proteins, using NAD^{+} as a substrate. This post-translational modification inhibits GTP hydrolysis, locking Gsα in its active GTP-bound state and continuously stimulating adenylyl cyclase.

This dramatically increases intracellular 3′,5′-cyclic AMP (cAMP) levels, activating protein kinase A (PKA). PKA phosphorylates and activates CFTR chloride channels, promoting the secretion of Cl^{-}, HCO_{3}^{-}, Na^{+}, and water into the intestinal lumen. Additionally, the uptake of Na^{+} and water by enterocytes is inhibited, resulting in the hallmark profuse watery diarrhoea (up to 1–2 litres per hour), contributing to severe dehydration and electrolyte imbalance in cholera patients.

A comparable mechanism is observed in the pertussis toxin produced by Bordetella pertussis, another AB_{5} family member. However, instead of targeting Gsα, the pertussis toxin ADP-ribosylates the Giα subunit, preventing it from inhibiting adenylyl cyclase. This, in turn, leads to increased cAMP levels via a distinct but related mechanism.

== Origin ==
The cholera toxin gene (ctxAB) was introduced into V. cholerae by horizontal gene transfer via a virus known as the CTXφ bacteriophage. Virulent V. cholerae strains ( serogroups O1 and O139 ) hold integrated genes from this bacteriophage including ctxAB and other phage genes. Furthermore, the integrated CTXφ genome share genes with its satellite phage, RS1 including:

- Replication (RstA),
- Integration (RstB)
- Regulation: preventing repression of CTXφ replication (RstC), regulation of gene expression (RstR),
- Phage packaging and secretion genes (Psh, Cep, OrfU, Ace and Zot), which share structural homology with Ff filamentous coliphages.

These genes enable the replication and secretion of the CTXφ bacteriophage without requiring excision of the prophage from the original host bacterium. As a result, the phage can horizontally transmit the gene encoding CTX to other susceptible cells along with the remainder of the phage genome.

== Applications ==
The B subunit of cholera toxin (CTB) is relatively non-toxic, making it a valuable tool in cell biology and molecular biology. It is commonly utilised as a neuronal tracer due to its ability of binding GM1 gangliosides on cell membranes, which enables visualisation of neuronal pathways.

Additionally, in neural stem cell research, CTB has been observed to influence the localisation of the transcription factor Hes3.

=== Vaccine ===
There are currently two vaccines for cholera that are available: Dukoral and Shanchol. Both vaccines use whole killed V. cholerae cells however, Dukoral also contains recombinant cholera toxin β (rCTB). Some studies suggest that the inclusion of rCTB may improve vaccine efficacy in young children (2-10) and increase the duration of protection. However, in contrast to Shanchol, the inclusion of rCTB in vaccines increases production cost and requires stringent storage conditions in order to prevent degradation.

=== Vaccine adjuvant ===
Another application of the CTB subunit may be as a mucosal vaccine adjuvant to other vaccines. It has been shown that coupling CTB and antigens improves the response vaccines. Research in large animal models supports its potential for improving vaccines against bacterial infections, viral infections, allergies and diabetes. This may allow for CTB to be used as an adjuvant for vaccinating against many kinds of diseases. Notably, CTB has shown to induce mucosal humoral immune responses, making it a promising candidate for vaccines targeting mucosal pathogens such as HIV.

=== Membrane biology research ===
==== Membrane structure & nanodomains ====
The B subunit of the cholera toxin has been shown to preferentially bind to GM1 gangliosides which are found in lipid rafts. By clustering GM1, CTB helps researchers study how membranes organize into nanodomains, gaining growing insight into cell signaling and intracellular cell trafficking. Lipid rafts are otherwise difficult to study as they vary in size and lifetime, as well being part of an extremely dynamic component of cells. Using CTB as a marker, we can get a better understanding of the properties and functions of rafts and related membrane nanodomains. Fluorescent tags on CTB or antibody-targeted CTB complexes to serve as effective markers for this purpose.

Additionally, the cholera toxin has the ability to both generate and sense surrounding membrane curvature.Therefore, it is utilized as an important tool and model in understanding how proteins are both influenced by and affect membrane morphology.

==== Endocytosis ====
Cholera toxin enters cells via multiple endocytic pathways, including:

- Clathrin-dependent (e.g., clathrin-coated pits)
- Clathrin-independent (e.g., caveolae, clathrin-independent carriers (CLICs), GPI-Enriched Endocytic Compartments (GEECs), ARF6-mediated and Fast Endophilin-Mediated Endocytosis (FEME)).

While the exact mechanism of how the cholera toxin triggers these endocytic pathways is not fully understood, the toxin serves as an important tool to investigate these mechanisms. As studying these pathways help researchers understand how pathogens and drugs enter cells.

==== Retrograde trafficking ====
One of the most important applications of CTB is in studying retrograde transport. Initially, the B-subunit binds to GM1 on the plasma membrane. Through vesicular trafficking, GM1 carries the toxin in a retrograde fashion through the secretory pathway, into the trans-Golgi network (TGN) and endoplasmic reticulum (ER). When the toxin arrives in the ER, a part of the A-subunit is released from the B-subunit, allowing it to retro- translocate to the cytosol where it initiates pathogenic effects. The toxins effective entry into the cell allow fluorescently tagged CTB and GM1 to be monitored in real-time, providing insight into intracellular transport and protein sorting and lipid sorting in the endocytotic pathway. Increasing understanding of these pathways can aid in designing targeted drug delivery systems as a part of clinical application.

== See also ==
- AB5 Toxin
- Enterotoxin
- Heat-labile enterotoxin
- GM1
- ADP-ribosylation
- Adenylyl cyclase
- Cyclic adenosine monophosphate
- Protein kinase A
- CFTR
- G protein
- Pertussis toxin
- Endocytosis
- Retrograde transport
- Protein disulfide isomerase
- Cholera
- Vibrio cholerae
- Toxoid vaccine
- Immunologic adjuvant
- Lipid raft
- John snow (Physician)
- WHO
