= GM1 =

Biochemical compound important in the brain and intestines

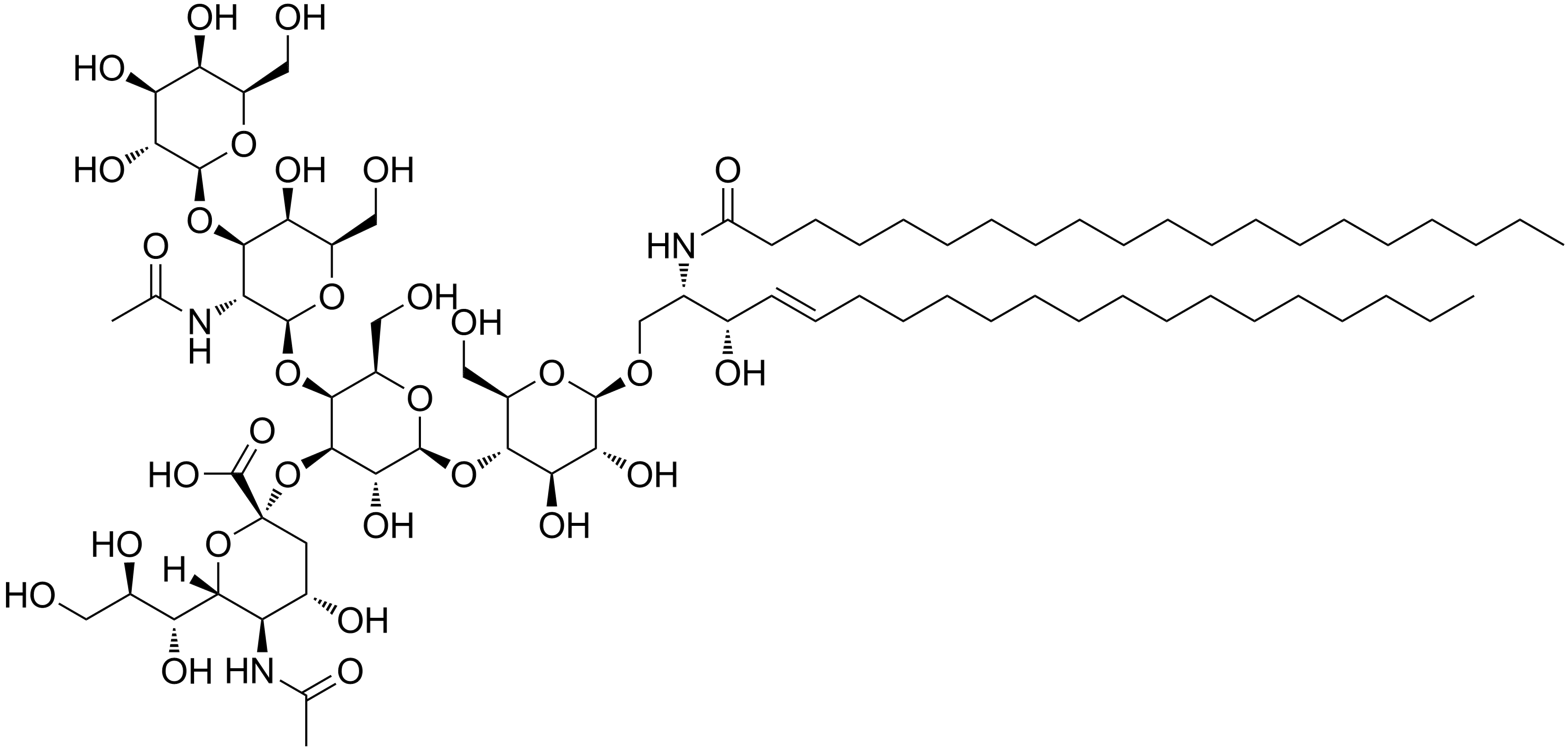

Names
- IUPAC name (2S,4S,5R,6R)-5-acetamido-2-[(2S,3R,4R,5S,6R)-5-[(2S,3R,4R,5R,6R)-3-acetamido-5-hydroxy-6-(hydroxymethyl)-4-[(2R,3R,4S,5R,6R)-3,4,5-trihydroxy-6-(hydroxymethyl)oxan-2-yl]oxyoxan-2-yl]oxy-2-[(2R,3S,4R,5R,6R)-4,5-dihydroxy-6-[(E,2R,3S)-3-hydroxy-2-(icosanoylamino)icos-4-enoxy]-2-(hydroxymethyl)oxan-3-yl]oxy-3-hydroxy-6-(hydroxymethyl)oxan-4-yl]oxy-4-hydroxy-6-[(1R,2R)-1,2,3-trihydroxypropyl]oxane-2-carboxylic acid
- Other names Monosialotetrahexosylganglioside

Identifiers
CAS Number	37758-47-7
3D model (JSmol)	Interactive image
ChemSpider	4593688
MeSH	G(M1)+Ganglioside
PubChem CID	5497107
UNII	A763JQ77KX
- InChI: InChI=1S/C73H131N3O31/c1-5-7-9-11-13-15-17-19-20-22-24-26-28-30-32-34-52(87)76-44(45(84)33-31-29-27-25-23-21-18-16-14-12-10-8-6-2)41-98-69-61(94)59(92)63(50(39-80)101-69)103-71-62(95)67(107-73(72(96)97)35-46(85)53(74-42(3)82)66(106-73)55(88)47(86)36-77)64(51(40-81)102-71)104-68-54(75-43(4)83)65(57(90)49(38-79)99-68)105-70-60(93)58(91)56(89)48(37-78)100-70/h31,33,44-51,53-71,77-81,84-86,88-95H,5-30,32,34-41H2,1-4H3,(H,74,82)(H,75,83)(H,76,87)(H,96,97)/b33-31+/t44?,45?,46-,47?,48+,49+,50+,51+,53+,54+,55?,56-,57-,58-,59+,60+,61+,62+,63+,64-,65+,66-,67+,68-,69+,70-,71-,73-/m0/s1 Key: QPJBWNIQKHGLAU-BVLUPYCXSA-N; InChI=1/C73H131N3O31/c1-5-7-9-11-13-15-17-19-20-22-24-26-28-30-32-34-52(87)76-44(45(84)33-31-29-27-25-23-21-18-16-14-12-10-8-6-2)41-98-69-61(94)59(92)63(50(39-80)101-69)103-71-62(95)67(107-73(72(96)97)35-46(85)53(74-42(3)82)66(106-73)55(88)47(86)36-77)64(51(40-81)102-71)104-68-54(75-43(4)83)65(57(90)49(38-79)99-68)105-70-60(93)58(91)56(89)48(37-78)100-70/h31,33,44-51,53-71,77-81,84-86,88-95H,5-30,32,34-41H2,1-4H3,(H,74,82)(H,75,83)(H,76,87)(H,96,97)/b33-31+/t44?,45?,46-,47?,48+,49+,50+,51+,53+,54+,55?,56-,57-,58-,59+,60+,61+,62+,63+,64-,65+,66-,67+,68-,69+,70-,71-,73-/m0/s1 Key: QPJBWNIQKHGLAU-BVLUPYCXBP
- SMILES: O[C@H]1[C@H](O[C@@H]2O[C@H](CO)[C@H](O[C@@H]3O[C@H](CO)[C@H](O)[C@H](O[C@@H]4O[C@H](CO)[C@H](O)[C@H](O)[C@H]4O)[C@H]3NC(C)=O)[C@H](O[C@@]5(C(O)=O)O[C@@]([H])([C@H](O)[C@H](O)CO)[C@H](NC(C)=O)[C@@H](O)C5)[C@H]2O)[C@@H](CO)O[C@@H](OC[C@@H]([C@@H](O)/C=C/CCCCCCCCCCCCCCC)NC(CCCCCCCCCCCCCCCCCCC)=O)[C@@H]1O

Properties
Chemical formula	C_{77}H_{139}N_{3}O_{31}
Molar mass	1602.949 g·mol^{−1}
- Except where otherwise noted, data are given for materials in their standard state (at 25 °C [77 °F], 100 kPa). verify (what is ?) Infobox references

GM1 (monosialotetrahexosylganglioside) the "prototype" ganglioside, is a member of the ganglio series of gangliosides which contain one sialic acid residue. GM1 has important physiological properties and impacts neuronal plasticity and repair mechanisms, and the release of neurotrophins in the brain. Besides its function in the physiology of the brain, GM1 acts as the site of binding for both cholera toxin and E. coli heat-labile enterotoxin (Traveller's diarrhea).

== GM1 and inherited disease ==
Galactosidases are enzymes that break down GM1, and the failure to remove GM1 results in GM1 gangliosidosis. GM1 gangliosidosis are inherited disorders that progressively destroy neurons in the brain and spinal cord as GM1 accumulates. Without treatment, this results in developmental decline and muscle weakness, eventually leading to severe retardation and death.

== GM1 and acquired disease ==
Antibodies to GM1 are increased in Guillain–Barré syndrome, dementia and lupus but their function is not clear. There is some evidence to suggest antibodies against GM1 are associated with diarrhea in Guillain–Barré syndrome.

GM1 antibodies are also seen in multifocal motor neuropathy (MMN), a rare antibody-mediated inflammatory neuropathy.

== GM1 and the cholera toxin ==
The bacteria Vibrio cholerae produces a multimeric toxin called the cholera toxin. The secreted toxin attaches to the surface of the host mucosa cell by binding to GM1 gangliosides. GM1 consists of a sialic acid-containing oligosaccharide covalently attached to a ceramide lipid. The A1 subunit of this toxin will gain entry to intestinal epithelial cells with the assistance of the B subunit via the GM1 ganglioside receptor. Once inside, the A1 subunit will ADP ribosylate the Gs alpha subunit, which will prevent its GTPase activity. This will lock it in the active state and it will continuously stimulate adenylate cyclase. The sustained adenylate cyclase activity will lead to a sustained increase of cAMP which will cause electrolyte and water loss, causing diarrhea.

The SGLT1 receptor is present in the small intestine. When the cholera patient is given a solution containing water, sodium and glucose, the SGLT1 receptor will reabsorb sodium and glucose, while water will be passively absorbed with the sodium. This will replace the water and electrolyte loss in the cholera-induced diarrhea.

== Therapeutic applications ==
Because of GM1's close role in neuron repair mechanisms, it has been investigated as a possible drug to slow or even reverse the progression of a wide range of neurodegenerative conditions. Controlled phase II studies have indicated that GM1 can ease the symptoms of Parkinson's disease, presumably by countering degeneration of the substantia nigra, and a similar methodology has been pursued to try and limit cellular damage from necrosis and apoptosis occurring after acute spinal cord injury.

== Additional images ==
Sphingolipidoses

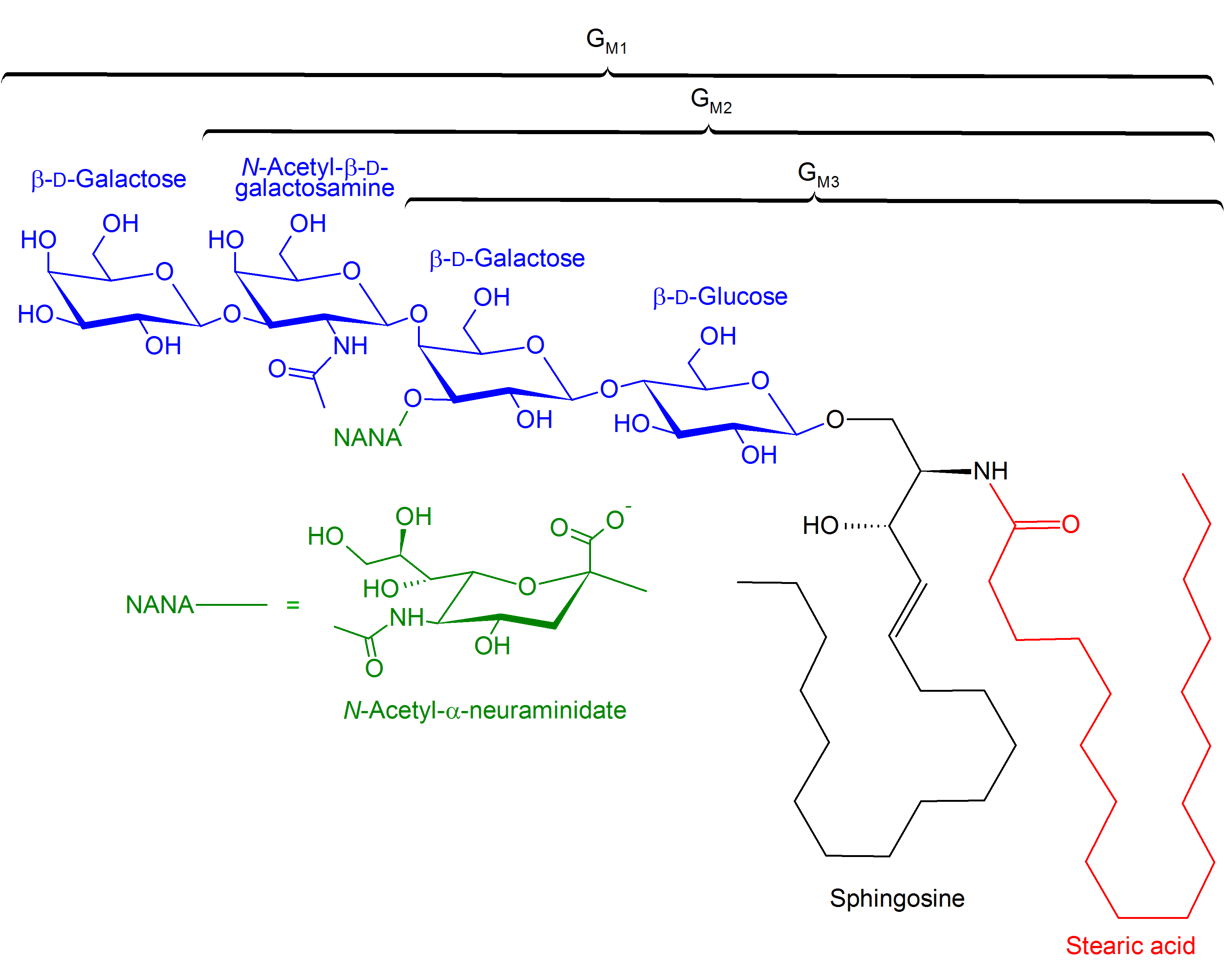
Structures of GM1, GM2, GM3 gangliosides
