= Heat-labile enterotoxin family =

Family of toxic protein complexes

Heat-labile enterotoxin alpha chain
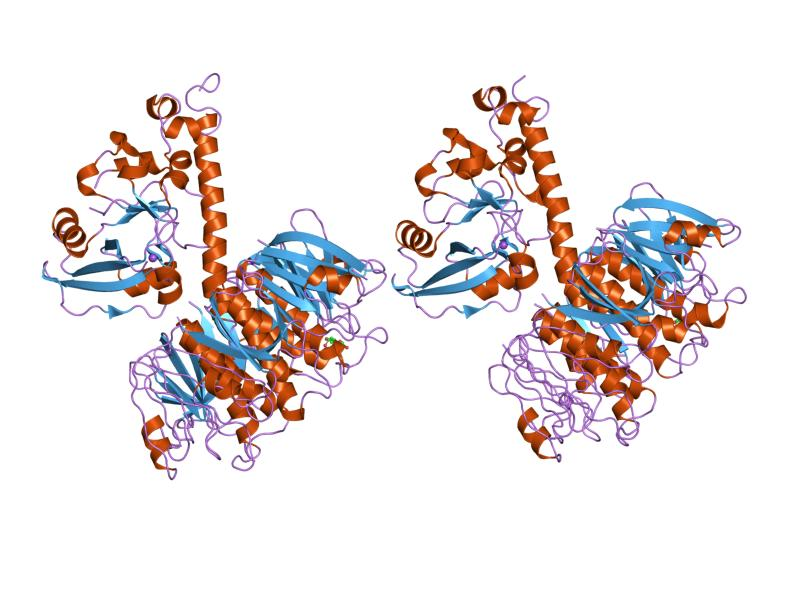
- cholera holotoxin, crystal form 1

Identifiers
- Symbol: Enterotoxin_a
- Pfam: PF01375
- Pfam clan: CL0084
- InterPro: IPR001144
- SCOP2: 1lts / SCOPe / SUPFAM
Available protein structures:
- PDB: IPR001144 PF01375 (ECOD; PDBsum)
- AlphaFold: IPR001144; PF01375

Heat-labile enterotoxin beta chain
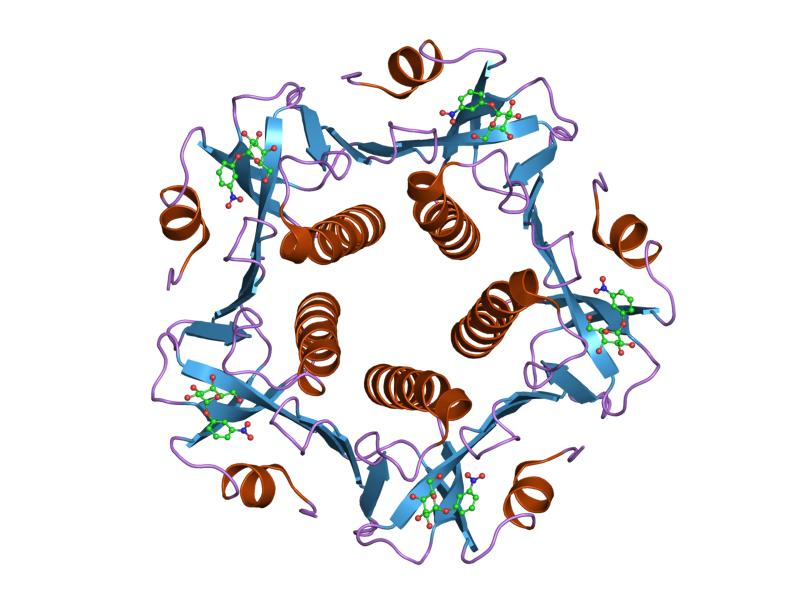
- cholera toxin b-pentamer complexed with metanitrophenyl-alpha-d-galactose

Identifiers
- Symbol: Enterotoxin_b
- Pfam: PF01376
- InterPro: IPR001835
- SCOP2: 1lts / SCOPe / SUPFAM
Available protein structures:
- PDB: IPR001835 PF01376 (ECOD; PDBsum)
- AlphaFold: IPR001835; PF01376

Type II heat-labile enterotoxin, B subunit (LT-IIB)
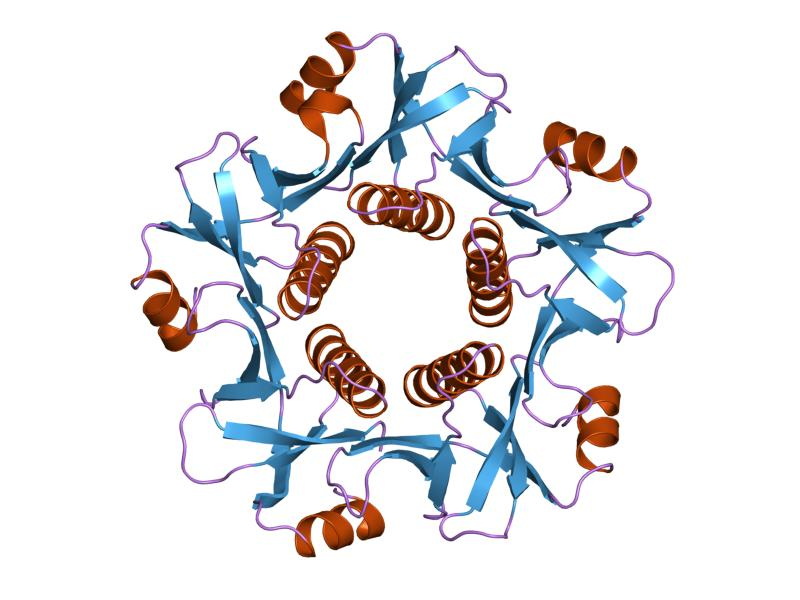
- escherichia coli heat labile enterotoxin type iib b-pentamer

Identifiers
- Symbol: LT-IIB
- Pfam: PF06453
- InterPro: IPR010503
- SCOP2: 1tii / SCOPe / SUPFAM
Available protein structures:
- PDB: IPR010503 PF06453 (ECOD; PDBsum)
- AlphaFold: IPR010503; PF06453

In molecular biology, the heat-labile enterotoxin family includes Escherichia coli heat-labile enterotoxin (Elt or LT) and cholera toxin (Ctx) secreted by Vibrio cholerae.

lt is so named because it is inactivated at high temperatures.

== Mechanism ==
The A subunits are transported inside by the pentameric B subunits. It then acts by raising cAMP levels through ADP-ribosylation of the alpha-subunit of a Gs protein leading to the constitutive activation of adenylate cyclase. Elevated cAMP levels stimulate the activation of the CFTR channel thus stimulating secretion of chloride ions and water from the enterocyte into the gut lumen. This ionic imbalance causes watery diarrhea.

In addition to its effects on chloride secretion, which involve the same steps as the effects of cholera toxin, Elt binds additional substrates: lipopolysaccharide on the surface of E. coli cells and A-type blood antigens. Studies have shown that these interactions can influence how the toxin associates with the bacterial surface and how effectively it is delivered to host cells, although their contribution may vary by strain and context.

== Structure ==
These toxins consist of an AB5 multimer structure, in which a pentamer of B chains has a membrane-binding function and an A chain is needed for enzymatic activity. The B subunits are arranged as a doughnut-shaped pentamer, each subunit participating in ~30 hydrogen bonds and 6 salt bridges with its two neighbours.

The A subunit has a less well-defined secondary structure. It predominantly interacts with the pentamer via the C-terminal A2 fragment, which runs through the charged central pore of the B subunits. A putative catalytic residue in the A1 fragment (Glu112) lies close to a hydrophobic region, which packs two loops together. It is thought that this region might be important for catalysis and membrane translocation.

The structural arrangement of E. coli type I and type II heat-labile enterotoxins are very similar, although they are antigenically distinct.

== Origin ==
The cholera toxin is carried by the CTXφ bacteriophage and may be isolated from plasmids. The E. coli LT (elt) is similarly associated with mobile elements, in this case Ent plasmids that can carry LT, ST, or both. Partial insertion sequences (ISs) flanking the elt genes provide extra transmission capabilities by homologous recombination at their inverted repeats. Οβ phage-induced conversion in E. coli has been described as well.

== Applications ==
The B subunits of toxins in this family is relatively harmless on its own. CtxB is routinely used as a neuronal tracer. Elt-IB has been looked into as an adjuvant in transdermal vaccines.
