= Sambhu Nath De =

Indian medical researcher (1915–1985)

Shambu Nath De FRS, FRSM
- শম্ভুনাথ দে
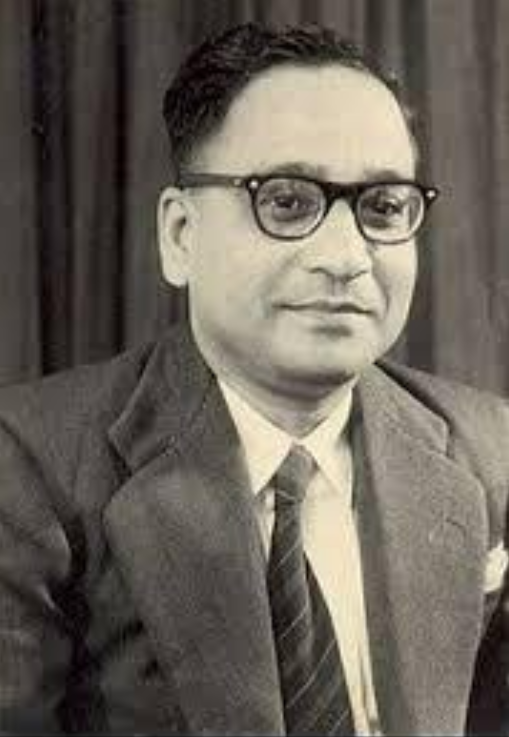
- Prof. Shambu Nath De
- Born: 1 February 1915; Garbati, Burashibtala, Hooghly, West Bengal, India
- Died: 15 April 1985 (aged 70); Kolkata, West Bengal, India
- Education: Hooghly Mohsin College; University of Calcutta; Calcutta Medical College; University College Hospital Medical School, London
- Known for: Discovery of Cholera toxin; Discovery of bacterial enteric toxins; Founder member of Tuberculosis Relief Association, Bengal (1946); Animal model for Cholera
- Awards: Coates Medal, Calcutta University, (1956); D. Sc. in Physiology, University of London (1961); D. Sc. (Honorary), Calcutta University (1994); Elected Fellow of Royal Society of Medicine, London (1947); Elected Member of the Pathological Society of Great Britain and Ireland (1949)
- Scientific career
- Fields: Pathology; Bacteriology
- Workplaces: Nilratan Sircar Medical College; Calcutta Medical College; Bose Institute
- Doctoral advisor: Roy Cameron, University College Hospital Medical School, London

Sambhunath De FRS FRSM; (1 February 1915 – 15 April 1985) was an Indian medical scientist and researcher, who discovered the cholera toxin, the animal model of cholera, and successfully demonstrated the method of transmission of cholera pathogen Vibrio cholerae.

== Early career ==
Shambhu Nath De was born in Hooghly District, West Bengal, India. His father Mr Dasarathi De was a not so successful businessman. Supported by his uncle Asutosh De, De completed the Matriculation examination with distinction from Garbati High School that helped him to get the District scholarship as well as to pursue further education in Hooghly Mohsin College, which was then affiliated with the prestigious University of Calcutta. His higher education was supported by Kestodhan Seth, who identified De as an extraordinary student. De passed his M.B. examination in 1939 from Calcutta Medical College and completed a Diploma in Tropical Medicine (DTM) in 1942. Soon after graduation he joined Calcutta Medical College as a Demonstrator of Pathology and initiated his research under Professor B. P. Tribedi. In 1947, De joined as a PhD student under Sir Roy Cameron at the Department of Morbid Anatomy, University College Hospital Medical School, London, and obtained his PhD degree in Pathology in 1949. After his return, De worked on pathogenesis of cholera and started publishing his findings. In 1955, De became the Head of Pathology and Bacteriology Division of the Calcutta Medical College, which he continued until his retirement. De published more than 30 research papers and has written an excellent monograph on cholera and its pathogenesis.

== Contributions ==
De made significant contributions to the recent understanding of cholera and related diarrhoeal diseases and set a permanent milestone in the modern view of diseases caused by bacterial exotoxins. Followed by the discovery of Vibrio cholerae in 1884 by Robert Koch, many works have been carried out all over the world to answer many questions related with its pathogenesis and mode of transmission in causing outbreaks. The seminal works of De in Calcutta (now Kolkata) during 1950–60 breached several qualms pertaining to the enteric toxin produced by bacteria including V. cholerae and Escherichia coli. Three of his works viz., ligated intestinal loop method (which was a reinvention of Violle and Crendiropoulo method in 1915, but De was unaware of this work and made an independent discovery) for studying cholera in rabbit model; ileal loop model to demonstrate the association of some strains of E. coli with diarrhoea and lastly but most importantly is his discovery of cholera toxin in 1959 in the cell-free culture filtrate of V. cholerae that stimulated a specific cellular response.

As noted by Garfield in his 1986 tribute, De was the first to demonstrate that cholera bacteria secrete enterotoxin. This discovery eventually promoted research to find a treatment aimed directly at neutralising the cholera enterotoxin. De's paper "Enterotoxicity of bacteria-free culture-filtrate of Vibrio cholerae," while initially unrecognised, today is considered a milestone in the history of cholera research. Biochemist W. E. van Heyningen, professor emeritus, University of Oxford, UK, and John R. Seal, former scientific director, National Institute of Allergy and Infectious Diseases, Bethesda, note that De's paper "deserves to go down as a classic in the history of cholera, and, indeed, as later developments have shown, in the history of cellular physiology and biochemistry." Thanks to De's discovery of the cholera enterotoxin, research has been redirected to find a vaccine that will spark the immune system to fight the enterotoxin specifically, rather than the bacteria.

De and colleagues also published highly cited pioneering studies on V. cholerae action on the intestinal membrane.^{,}^{,} The 1953 paper “An experimental study of the mechanism of action of Vibrio cholerae on the intestinal mucous membrane” is De’s most-cited paper, cited 340 times until August 1986. It was especially influential on research fronts on "E. coli and Vibrio cholerae enterotoxin: detection, characterization, and role of adherence" and "Characterization of cholera enterotoxin and other enterotoxins". John Craig of State University of New York Health Science Center at Brooklyn described De’s work as truly creative and novel, having “forever altered our concepts surrounding the pathogenesis of secretory diarrhoea.”

These findings resulted from work he conducted at the Nilratan Sircar Medical College, Calcutta Medical College, and Bose Institute in Kolkata. His research used relatively simple and inexpensive methods.

In the words of Nobel Laureate Prof. Joshua Lederberg, “De’s clinical observations led him to the bold thought that dehydration was a sufficient cause of pathology of cholera, that the cholera toxin can kill ‘merely’ by stimulating the secretion of water into the bowel". Thus, the oral rehydration therapy (ORT) for replenishing the massive fluid loss in cholera patients, has saved innumerable lives, should be considered as a direct outcome of De's discovery of cholera toxin. His findings on exotoxins set the stage for the modern views of diseases caused by toxin producing bacteria, helped in the purification of cholera and heat-labile (LT) enterotoxins produced by V. cholerae and E. coli, respectively, and in the development of series of cholera and enterotoxigenic E. coli (in short ETEC strains) vaccines.

== Post-retirement ==
De retired in 1973 from the Calcutta Medical College at the age of 58. After his retirement, he showed no interest in higher positions but continued his research at the Bose Institute, Calcutta. De's desire to purify the cholera toxin did not progress any further as the protein purification technology was not well established in his research settings. During his time of research, De worked with hypertoxin-producing classical strains of V. cholerae O1, which was abruptly replaced by El Tor biotype [producing less cholera toxin] in Calcutta from 1963. This new development was another reason why De could not continue his research on purification of cholera toxin.

In 1978, the Nobel Foundation invited De to participate in the 43rd Nobel Symposium on Cholera and Related Diarrhoeas.

De died on 15 April 1985 at the age of 70.

== Significance of work ==
But for Eugene Garfield's 1986 tribute to De in Current Contents, De's great contributions to cholera research would have remained unknown to many even in India. A special issue of the journal Current Science was published in 1990 in his honour, to which several eminent scientists of national and international repute contributed.

In the words of Dr S Sriramachari, former director of the Institute of Pathology and additional director general of the Indian Council of Medical Research, New Delhi, De's contributions stand out as a pinnacle of excellence in our understanding of the pathogenesis of cholera.

Nobel laureate Prof. Joshua Lederberg had nominated De for the Nobel Prize more than once. Said Lederberg, "our appreciation of De must then extend beyond the humanitarian consequences of his discovery. . . he is also an examplar and inspiration for a boldness of challenge to the established wisdom, a style of thought that should be more aggressively taught by example as well as precept.”

De was never elected a fellow of any Indian academy and never received any major award. Indeed as Professor Padmanabhan Balaram pointed out in an editorial in Current Science, "De died in 1985 unhonoured and unsung in India's scientific circles. That De received no major award in India during his lifetime and our Academies did not see it fit to elect him to their Fellowships must rank as one of the most glaring omissions of our time. De emerges, in retrospect, as a modest self-effacing scientist driven by inner compulsions to grapple with a major scientific problem of the time. His choice of cholera as his field of interest was remarkably appropriate to his setting. To this problem De brought a wonderfully thoughtful approach, together with deep intuition, enabling him to make the long-awaited breakthrough in the field."
