= Filippo Pacini =

Italian anatomist (1812–1883)

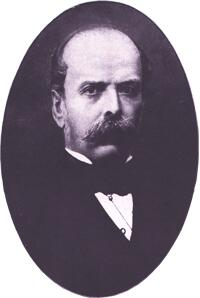
- Born: 25 May 1812; Pistoia, Arno, French Empire
- Died: 9 July 1883 (aged 71); Florence, Kingdom of Italy
- Education: School of Medicine and Surgery of Pistoia; University of Pisa
- Known for: Pacinian corpuscles Discovery of cholera bacillus
- Scientific career
- Fields: Anatomy
- Workplaces: Institute of Human Anatomy; Florence Lyceum; University of Florence Istituto di Studi Superiori
- Academic advisors: Paolo Savi

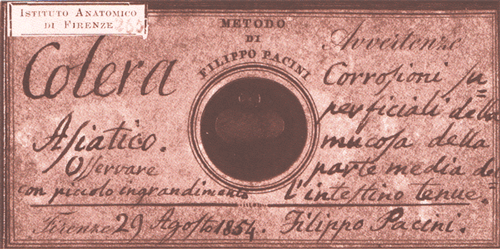
This microscope slide, prepared by Pacini in 1854, was clearly identified as containing the cholera bacterium.

Filippo Pacini (25 May 1812 – 9 July 1883) was an Italian anatomist, posthumously famous for isolating the cholera bacterium Vibrio cholerae in 1854, well before Robert Koch's more widely accepted discoveries 30 years later.

== Biography ==
Filippo Pacini was born in Pistoia, Tuscany, to Francesco Pacini, a humble cobbler, and Umiltà Dolfi, but was given a religious education in hopes that he would become a bishop. However, in 1830, he was given a scholarship to the most venerable medical school in Pistoia. He learned his job as a doctor and how to examine and dissect dead bodies under a microscope.

In 1831, during a dissection class, Pacini discovered small sensory organs in the nervous system which can detect pressure and vibrations. He studied them closely from 1833 on, and first discussed them in 1835 at the Società medico-fisica in Florence, but did not publish his research ("Nuovi organi scoperti nel corpo umano") until 1840. Within just a few years, the work was widely known in Europe and the bodies had become known as Pacinian corpuscles.

He served as an assistant to Paolo Savi in Pisa from 1840 to 1843, then began working at the Institute of Human Anatomy. He was professor of anatomy at the University of Pisa from 1844 to 1846. In 1847, Pacini began teaching at the Lyceum in Florence, and then in 1849 was appointed to the chair of General and Topographic Anatomy at the Istituto di Studi Superiori (later renamed as the University of Florence), where he remained to the end of his career.

The 1846–1860 cholera pandemic was the time period when Pacini made his discovery of the cholera bacillus. Cholera came to Florence in 1854 during what is now known as the third cholera pandemic. Pacini became very interested in the disease. Immediately following the death of cholera patients, he performed an autopsy and with his microscope, conducted histological examinations of the intestinal mucosa. During such studies, Pacini discovered a comma-shaped bacillus which he described as a Vibrio. He published a paper in 1854 entitled, "Microscopical observations and pathological deductions on cholera" in which he described the organism and its relation to the disease. His microscopic slides of the organism were clearly labeled, identifying the date and nature of his investigations (see figure). But because of the prevailing belief of Italian scientists in the miasma theory of disease, the work was not noted by others until many years after his death, despite additional publications in 1865, 1866, 1871, 1876, and 1880 which identified the cause of the disease's lethality, and even proposed some effective treatments. John Snow, who disproved the miasma theory, and Robert Koch, were widely and erroneously credited with the discovery of the bacillum 30 years later. Pacini's work was repeatedly published and readily available to the international scientific community via the English translation published in The British and Foreign Medico-chirurgical Review, Volume 38, July 1866. Also in 1854, the Catalan Joaquim Balcells i Pascual discovered the cholera bacterium.

When Koch, a much more widely respected scientist who had previously identified the tuberculosis bacillus, presented his findings to the Cholera Commission of the Imperial Health Office in Berlin in 1884, the commission congratulated him, but also recognized Pacini's previous discovery of the bacterium. In 1965, the international committee on nomenclature adopted the formal name Vibrio cholerae Pacini 1854 to honor his work.

During his career, Pacini also published several studies on the retina of the human eye, the electric organs in electric fishes, the structure of bone, and the mechanics of respiration.

Pacini spent most of the money remaining after his scientific investigations on the long-term care of his two ailing sisters, Assunta and Maria Giustina. He died nearly penniless in Florence on July 9, 1883, and was buried in the cemetery of the Misericordia. In 1935, his remains were transferred to the church of Santa Maria delle Grazie in Pistoia, along with the remains of Atto Tigri and Filippo Civinini, two other noted anatomists.
