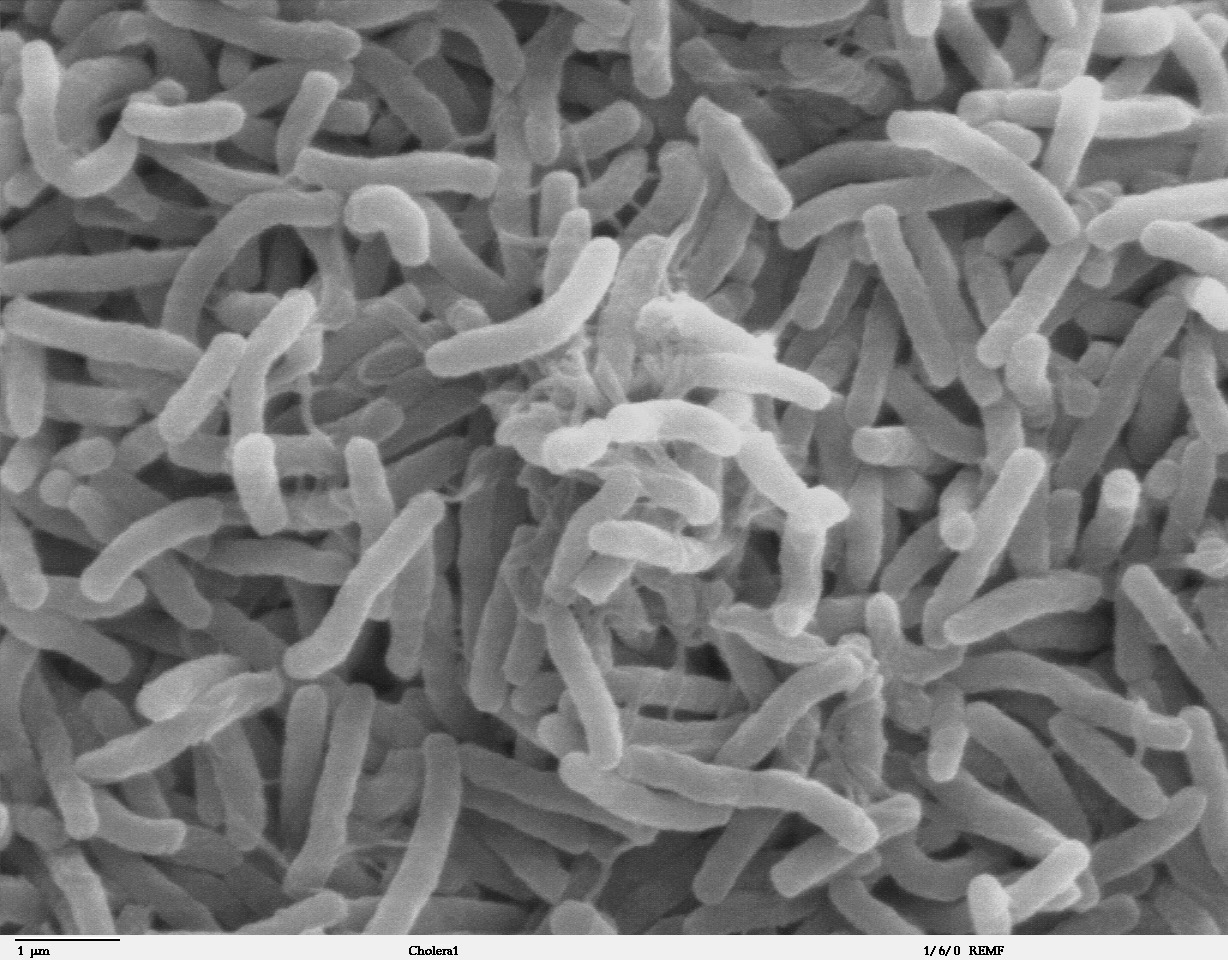

Scientific classification
- Domain: Bacteria
- Kingdom: Pseudomonadati
- Phylum: Pseudomonadota
- Class: Gammaproteobacteria
- Order: Vibrionales
- Family: Vibrionaceae
- Genus: Vibrio
- Species: V. cholerae

Binomial name
- Vibrio cholerae Pacini, 1854

= Vibrio cholerae =

Species of bacterium

Vibrio cholerae is a species of Gram-negative, facultative anaerobe and comma-shaped bacteria. The bacteria naturally live in brackish or saltwater where they attach themselves easily to the chitin-containing shells of crabs, shrimp, and other shellfish. Some strains of V. cholerae are pathogenic to humans and cause a deadly disease called cholera, which can be derived from the consumption of undercooked or raw marine life species or drinking contaminated water.

V. cholerae was first described by Félix-Archimède Pouchet in 1849 as some kind of protozoa. Filippo Pacini correctly identified it as a bacterium and from him, the scientific name is adopted. The bacterium as the cause of cholera was discovered by Robert Koch in 1884. Sambhu Nath De isolated the cholera toxin and demonstrated the toxin as the cause of cholera in 1959.

The bacterium has a flagellum (a tail like structure) at one pole and several pili throughout its cell surface. It undergoes respiratory and fermentative metabolism. Two serogroups called O1 and O139 are responsible for cholera outbreaks. Infection is mainly through drinking contaminated water or ingestion of food contaminated with faecal matter from an infected person, therefore is linked to sanitation and hygiene. When ingested, it invades the intestinal mucosa which can cause diarrhea and vomiting in a host within several hours to 2–3 days of ingestion. Ringer's lactate and oral rehydration solution, combined with antibiotics such as fluoroquinolones and tetracyclines, are the common treatment methods in severe cases.

V. cholerae has two circular chromosomes. One chromosome produces the cholera toxin (CT), a protein that causes profuse, watery diarrhea (known as "rice-water stool"). But the DNA does not directly code for the toxin as the genes for cholera toxin are carried by CTXphi (CTXφ), a temperate bacteriophage (virus). The virus only produces the toxin when inserted into the bacterial DNA. Quorum sensing in V. cholerae is well studied and it activates host immune signaling and prolongs host survival, by limiting the bacterial intake of nutrients, such as tryptophan, which further is converted to serotonin. As such, quorum sensing allows a commensal interaction between host and pathogenic bacteria.

== Discovery ==
=== Initial observations ===
During the third global pandemic of cholera (1846–1860), there was extensive scientific research to understand the etiology of the disease. The miasma theory, which posited that infections spread through contaminated air, was no longer a satisfactory explanation. The English physician John Snow was the first to give convincing evidence in London in 1854 that cholera was spread from drinking water – a contagion, not miasma. Yet he could not identify the pathogens, which made most people still believe in the miasma origin.

V. cholerae was first observed and recognized under microscope by the French zoologist Félix-Archimède Pouchet. In 1849, Pouchet examined the stool samples of four people having cholera. His presentation before the French Academy of Sciences on 23 April was recorded as: "[Pouchet] could verify that there existed in these [cholera patients] dejecta an immense quantity of microscopic infusoria." As summarised in the Gazette medicale de Paris (1849, p 327), in a letter read at the 23 April 1849 meeting of the Paris Academy of Sciences, Pouchet announced that the organisms were infusoria, a name then used for microscopic protists, naming them as the 'Vibrio rugula of Mueller and Shrank', a species of protozoa described by Danish naturalist Otto Friedrich Müller in 1786.

=== Identification of the bacterium ===
An Italian physician, Filippo Pacini, while investigating cholera outbreak in Florence in the late 1854, identified the causative pathogen as a new type of bacterium. He performed autopsies of corpses and made meticulous microscopic examinations of the tissues and body fluids. From feces and intestinal mucosa, he identified many comma-shaped bacilli. Reporting his discovery before the Società Medico-Fisica Fiorentina (Medico-Physician Society of Florence) on 10 December, and published in the 12 December issue of the Gazzetta Medica Italiana (Medical Gazette of Italy), Pacini stated:

Le poche materie del vomito che ho potuto esaminare nel secondo e terzo caso di cholera ... e di più trovai degli ammassi granulosi appianati, simili a quelli che si formano alla superficie delle acque corrotte, quando sono per svilupparsi dei vibrioni; dei quali di fatto ne trovai alcuni del genere Bacterium, mentre la massima parte, per la loro estrema piccolezza, erano stati eliminati con la decantazione del fluido. [From the few samples of vomit that I was able to examine in the second and third cases of cholera ... and in addition I found smoothed granular masses, similar to those which form on the surface of dirty waters, when they are about to develop vibrios; of which in fact I found some of the genus Bacterium, while the greatest part, because of their extreme smallness, had been eliminated with the removal of the liquid.]

Pacini thus introduced the name vibrioni (Latin vībro means "to move rapidly to and fro, to shake, to agitate"). A Catalan physician Joaquim Balcells i Pascual also reported such bacterium around the same time. The discovery of the new bacterium was not regarded as medically important as the bacterium was not directly attributed to cholera. Pacini also stated that there was no reason to say that the bacterium caused the disease since he failed to create a pure culture and perform experiments, which was necessary 'to attribute the quality of contagion to cholera'. The miasma theory was still not ruled out.

=== Rediscovery ===
The medical importance and relationship between the bacterium and the cholera disease was discovered by German physician Robert Koch. In August 1883, Koch, with a team of German physicians, went to Alexandria, Egypt, to investigate the cholera epidemic there. Koch found that the intestinal mucosa of people who died of cholera always had the bacterium, yet he could not confirm if it was the causative agent. He moved to Calcutta (now Kolkata), India, where the epidemic was more severe. It was from here that he isolated the bacterium in a pure culture on 7 January 1884. He subsequently confirmed that the bacterium was a new species, and described it as "a little bent, like a comma." He reported his discovery to the German Secretary of State for the Interior on 2 February, and it was published in the Deutsche Medizinische Wochenschrift (German Medical Weekly).

Although Koch was convinced that the bacterium was the cholera pathogen, he could not entirely procure critical evidence that the bacterium produced the symptoms in healthy subjects (an important element in what was later known as Koch's postulates). His experiment on animals using his pure bacteria culture did not lead to the appearance of the disease in any of the subjects, and he correctly deduced that animals are immune to the human pathogen. The bacterium was by then known as "the comma bacillus." It was only in 1959, in Calcutta, that Indian physician Sambhu Nath De isolated the cholera toxin and showed that it caused cholera in healthy subjects, hence fully proving the bacterium-cholera relationship.

=== Taxonomy ===
Pacini had used the name "vibrio cholera", without proper binomial rendering, for the name of the bacterium. Following Koch's description, a scientific name Bacillus comma was popularised. But an Italian bacteriologist Vittore Trevisan published in 1884 that Koch's bacterium was the same as that of Pacini's and introduced the name Bacillus cholerae. A German physician Richard Friedrich Johannes Pfeiffer renamed it as Vibrio cholerae in 1896. The name was adopted by the Committee of the Society of American Bacteriologists on Characterization and Classification of Bacterial Types in 1920. In 1964, Rudolph Hugh of the George Washington University School of Medicine proposed to use the genus Vibrio with the type species V. cholerae (Pacini 1854) as a permanent name of the bacterium, regardless of the same name for protozoa. It was accepted by the Judicial Commission of the International Committee on Bacteriological Nomenclature in 1965, and the International Association of Microbiological Societies in 1966.

== Characteristics ==
V. cholerae is a highly motile, comma shaped, gram-negative rod. The active movement of V. cholerae inspired the genus name because "vibrio" in Latin means "to quiver". Except for V. cholerae and V. mimicus, all other vibrio species are halophilic. Initial isolates are slightly curved, whereas they can appear as straight rods upon laboratory culturing. The bacterium has a flagellum at one cell pole as well as pili. It tolerates alkaline media that kill most intestinal commensals, but they are sensitive to acid. It is an aerobe while all other Vibrios are facultative anaerobes, and can undergo respiratory and fermentative metabolism. It measures 0.3 μm in diameter and 1.3 μm in length with average swimming velocity of around 75.4 μm/sec.

== Pathogenicity ==
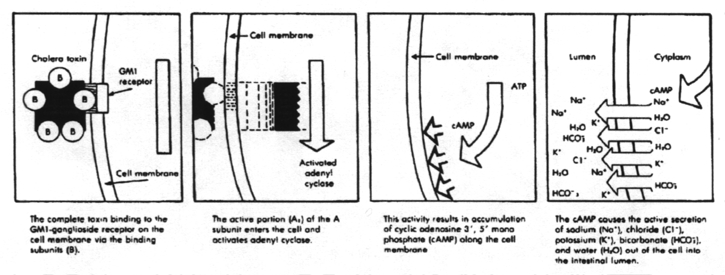
Cholera toxin interrupting regulation of adenyl cyclase inside the cell causing efflux of water and sodium into the intestinal lumen

V. cholerae pathogenicity genes code for proteins directly or indirectly involved in the virulence of the bacteria. To adapt the host intestinal environment and to avoid being attacked by bile acids and antimicrobial peptides, V. cholera uses its outer membrane vesicles (OMVs). Upon entry, the bacteria sheds its OMVs, containing all the membrane modifications that make it vulnerable for the host attack.

During infection, V. cholerae secretes cholera toxin (CT), a protein that causes profuse, watery diarrhea (known as "rice-water stool"). This cholera toxin contains 5 B subunits that plays a role in attaching to the intestinal epithelial cells and 1 A subunit that plays a role in toxin activity. Colonization of the small intestine also requires the toxin coregulated pilus (TCP), a thin, flexible, filamentous appendage on the surface of bacterial cells. Expression of both CT and TCP is mediated by two component systems (TCS), which typically consist of a membrane-bound histidine kinase and an intracellular response element. TCS enable bacteria to respond to changing environments. In V. cholerae several TCS have been identified to be important in colonization, biofilm production and virulence. Quorum regulatory small RNAs (Qrr RNA) have been identified as targets of V. cholerae TCS. Here, the small RNA (sRNA) molecules bind to mRNA to block translation or induce degradation of inhibitors of expression of virulence or colonization genes. In V. cholerae the TCS EnvZ/OmpR alters gene expression via the sRNA coaR in response to changes in osmolarity and pH. An important target of coaR is tcpI, which negatively regulates expression of the major subunit of the TCP encoding gene (tcpA). When tcpI is bound by coaR it is no longer able to repress expression tcpA, leading to an increased colonization ability. Expression of coaR is upregulated by EnvZ/OmpR at a pH of 6,5, which is the normal pH of the intestinal lumen, but is low at higher pH values. V. cholerae in the intestinal lumen utilizes the TCP to attach to the intestinal mucosa, not invading the mucosa. After doing so it secretes cholerae toxin causing its symptoms. This then increases cyclic AMP or cAMP by binding (cholerae toxin) to adenylyl cyclase activating the GS pathway which leads to efflux of water and sodium into the intestinal lumen causing watery stools or rice watery stools.

V. cholerae can cause syndromes ranging from asymptomatic to cholera gravis. In endemic areas, 75% of cases are asymptomatic, 20% are mild to moderate, and 2–5% are severe forms such as cholera gravis. Symptoms include abrupt onset of watery diarrhea (a grey and cloudy liquid), occasional vomiting, and abdominal cramps. Dehydration ensues, with symptoms and signs such as thirst, dry mucous membranes, decreased skin turgor, sunken eyes, hypotension, weak or absent radial pulse, tachycardia, tachypnea, hoarse voice, oliguria, cramps, kidney failure, seizures, somnolence, coma, and death. Death due to dehydration can occur in a few hours to days in untreated children. The disease is also particularly dangerous for pregnant women and their fetuses during late pregnancy, as it may cause premature labor and fetal death. A study done by the Centers for Disease Control (CDC) in Haiti found that in pregnant women who contracted the disease, 16% of 900 women had fetal death. Risk factors for these deaths include: third trimester, younger maternal age, severe dehydration, and vomiting Dehydration poses the biggest health risk to pregnant women in countries that there are high rates of cholera. In cases of cholera gravis involving severe dehydration, up to 60% of patients can die; however, less than 1% of cases treated with rehydration therapy are fatal. The disease typically lasts 4–6 days. Worldwide, diarrhoeal disease, caused by cholera and many other pathogens, is the second-leading cause of death for children under the age of 5 and at least 120,000 deaths are estimated to be caused by cholera each year. In 2002, the WHO deemed that the case fatality ratio for cholera was about 3.95%.

== Cholera illness and symptoms ==
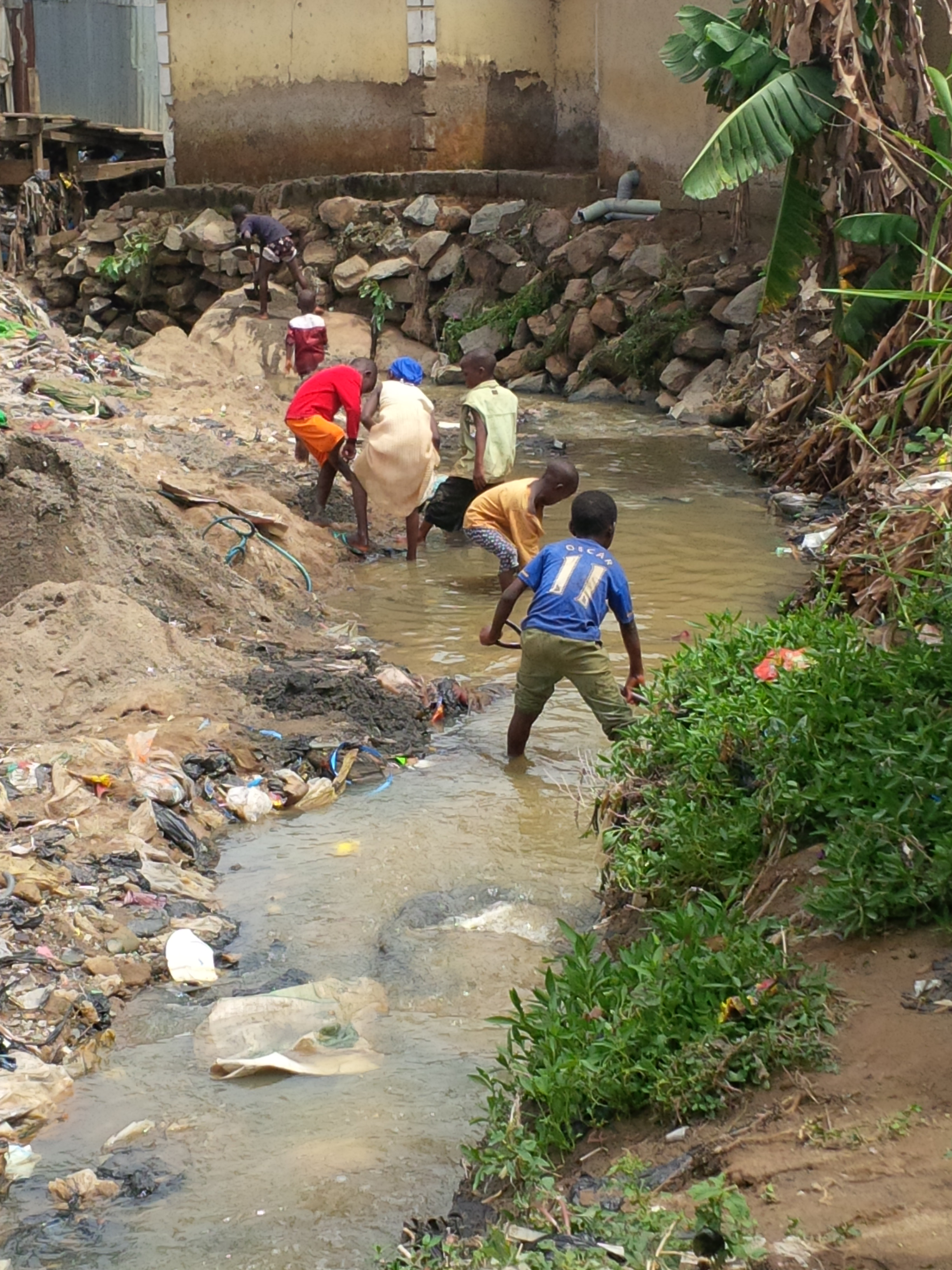
Children in Mpape community play in a waste water drainage area. This drainage was the suspected source of contamination of the well water that led to the cholera outbreak investigated by Nigeria FELTP residents in April 2014. Two samples collected from home wells around this drainage tested positive for Vibrio cholerae.

V. cholerae infects the intestine and causes diarrhea, the hallmark symptom of cholera. Infection can be spread by eating contaminated food or drinking contaminated water. It also can spread through skin contact with contaminated human feces. Not all infections cause symptoms; only about 1 in 10 people develop diarrhea. The major symptoms include: watery diarrhea, vomiting, rapid heart rate, loss of skin elasticity, low blood pressure, dehydration, and muscle cramps. This illness can get serious as it can progress to kidney failure and possibly a coma. If diagnosed, it can be treated using medications.

== Disease occurrence ==
V. cholerae has an endemic or epidemic occurrence. In countries where the disease has been for the past three years and the cases confirmed are local (within the confines of the country) transmission is considered to be "endemic." Alternatively, an outbreak is declared when the occurrence of disease exceeds the normal occurrence for any given time or location. Epidemics can last several days or over a span of years. Additionally, countries that have an occurrence of an epidemic can also be endemic. Cholera outbreaks are increasing in occurrence, distribution and intensity due to climate change.

The longest standing V. cholerae epidemic was recorded in Yemen. Yemen had two outbreaks, the first occurred between September 2016 and April 2017, and the second began later in April 2017 and recently was considered to be resolved in 2019. The epidemic in Yemen took over 2,500 lives and impacted over 1 million people of Yemen. More outbreaks have occurred in Africa, the Americas, and Haiti.

== Preventive measures ==
When visiting areas with epidemic cholera, the following precautions should be observed: drink and use bottled water; frequently wash hands with soap and safe water; use chemical toilets or bury feces if no restroom is available; do not defecate in any body of water and cook food thoroughly. Supplying proper, safe water is important. A precaution to take is to properly sanitize. Hand hygiene is an essential in areas where soap and water is not available. When there is no sanitation available for hand washing, scrub hands with ash or sand and rinse with clean water. A single dose vaccine is available for those traveling to an area where cholera is common.

There is a V. cholerae vaccine available to prevent disease spread. The vaccine is known as the, "oral cholera vaccine" (OCV). There are three types of OCV available for prevention: Dukoral®, Shanchol™, and Euvichol-Plus®. All three OCVs require two doses to be fully effective. Countries who are endemic or have an epidemic status are eligible to receive the vaccine based on several criteria: Risk of cholera, Severity of cholera, WASH conditions and capacity to improve, Healthcare conditions and capacity to improve, Capacity to implement OCV campaigns, Capacity to conduct M&E activities, Commitment at national and local level Since May the start of the OCV program to May 2018 over 25 million vaccines have been distributed to countries who meet the above criteria.

== Treatment ==
The basic, overall treatment for Cholera is re-hydration, to replace the fluids that have been lost. Those with mild dehydration can be treated orally with an oral rehydration solution (ORS). When patients are severely dehydrated and unable to take in the proper amount of ORS, IV fluid treatment is generally pursued. Antibiotics are used in some cases, typically fluoroquinolones and tetracyclines.

== Genome ==
V. cholerae (and Vibrionaceae in general) has two circular chromosomes, together totalling 4 million base pairs of DNA sequence and 3,885 predicted genes. The genes for cholera toxin are carried by CTXphi (CTXφ), a temperate bacteriophage inserted into the V. cholerae genome. CTXφ can transmit cholera toxin genes from one V. cholerae strain to another, one form of horizontal gene transfer. The genes for toxin coregulated pilus are coded by the Vibrio pathogenicity island (VPI), which is separate from the prophage.

The larger first chromosome is 3 Mbp long with 2,770 open reading frames (ORFs). It contains the crucial genes for toxicity, regulation of toxicity, and important cellular functions, such as transcription and translation.

The second chromosome is 1 Mbp long with 1115 ORFs. It is determined to be different from a plasmid or megaplasmid due to the inclusion of housekeeping and other essential genes in the genome, including essential genes for metabolism, heat-shock proteins, and 16S rRNA genes, which are ribosomal subunit genes used to track evolutionary relationships between bacteria. Also relevant in determining if the replicon is a chromosome is whether it represents a significant percentage of the genome, and chromosome 2 is 40% by size of the entire genome. And, unlike plasmids, chromosomes are not self-transmissible. However, the second chromosome may have once been a megaplasmid because it contains some genes usually found on plasmids, including a P1 plastid-like origin of replication.

=== Bacteriophage CTXφ ===
CTXφ (also called CTXphi) is a filamentous phage that contains the genes for cholera toxin. Infectious CTXφ particles are produced when V. cholerae infects humans. Phage particles are secreted from bacterial cells without lysis. When CTXφ infects V. cholerae cells, it integrates into specific sites on either chromosome. These sites often contain tandem arrays of integrated CTXφ prophage. In addition to the ctxA and ctxB genes encoding cholera toxin, CTXφ contains eight genes involved in phage reproduction, packaging, secretion, integration, and regulation. The CTXφ genome is 6.9 kb long.

=== Computational modeling ===
Advances in systems biology have introduced computational modeling methods for studying the biology and pathogenesis of V. cholerae. Researchers utilize genome-scale metabolic models (GEMs) to mathematically map the bacterium's complete biochemical network based on its annotated genomic sequence. These models are typically analyzed using software such as the COnstraint-Based Reconstruction and Analysis (COBRA) Toolbox, which employs flux balance analysis (FBA) to predict cellular phenotypes, growth rates, and metabolic fluxes under defined in silico environments.

In the context of V. cholerae research, these computational tools are used to study the metabolic burden of virulence. By combining the V. cholerae network with metabolic reconstructions of other bacteria, researchers can computationally simulate competition, nutrient cross-feeding, and resource allocation within the complex ecosystem of the human gut microbiome. Furthermore, the development of pan-genome metabolic models enables the comparison of different V. cholerae serogroups and biotypes, which helps improve the understanding of the evolutionary divergence and metabolic versatility that distinguish epidemic strains from non-pathogenic environmental strains.

== Ecology and epidemiology ==
The main reservoirs of V. cholerae are aquatic sources such as rivers, brackish waters, and estuaries, often in association with copepods or other zooplankton, shellfish, and aquatic plants.

Cholera infections are most commonly acquired from drinking water in which V. cholerae is found naturally or into which it has been introduced from the feces of an infected person. Cholera is most likely to be found and spread in places with inadequate water treatment, poor sanitation, and inadequate hygiene. Other common vehicles include raw or undercooked fish and shellfish. Transmission from person to person is very unlikely, and casual contact with an infected person is not a risk for becoming ill.V. cholerae thrives in an aquatic environment, particularly in surface water. The primary connection between humans and pathogenic strains is through water, particularly in economically reduced areas that do not have good water purification systems.

Nonpathogenic strains are also present in water ecologies. The wide variety of pathogenic and nonpathogenic strains that co-exist in aquatic environments are thought to allow for so many genetic varieties. Gene transfer is fairly common amongst bacteria, and recombination of different V. cholerae genes can lead to new virulent strains.

A symbiotic relationship between V. cholerae and Ruminococcus obeum has been determined. R. obeum autoinducer represses the expression of several V. cholerae virulence factors. This inhibitory mechanism is likely to be present in other gut microbiota species which opens the way to mine the gut microbiota of members in specific communities which may utilize autoinducers or other mechanisms in order to restrict colonization by V. cholerae or other enteropathogens. Autoinducers, specifically with V. cholerae, can develop biofilms and control virulence in response to extracellular quorum-sensing molecules.

Outbreaks of Cholera cause an estimated 120,000 deaths annually worldwide. There has been roughly seven pandemics since 1817, the first. These pandemics first arose in the Indian subcontinent and spread.

== Diversity and evolution ==
Two serogroups of V. cholerae, O1 and O139, cause outbreaks of cholera. O1 causes the majority of outbreaks, while O139 – first identified in Bangladesh in 1992 – is confined to Southeast Asia. Many other serogroups of V. cholerae, with or without the cholera toxin gene (including the nontoxigenic strains of the O1 and O139 serogroups), can cause a cholera-like illness. Only toxigenic strains of serogroups O1 and O139 have caused widespread epidemics.

V. cholerae O1 has two biotypes, classical and El Tor, and each biotype has two distinct serotypes, Inaba and Ogawa. The symptoms of infection are indistinguishable, although more people infected with the El Tor biotype remain asymptomatic or have only a mild illness. In recent years, infections with the classical biotype of V. cholerae O1 have become rare and are limited to parts of Bangladesh and India. Recently, new variant strains have been detected in several parts of Asia and Africa. Observations suggest these strains cause more severe cholera with higher case fatality rates.

== Natural genetic transformation ==
V. cholerae can be induced to become competent for natural genetic transformation when grown on chitin, a biopolymer that is abundant in aquatic habitats (e.g. from crustacean exoskeletons). Natural genetic transformation is a sexual process involving DNA transfer from one bacterial cell to another through the intervening medium, and the integration of the donor sequence into the recipient genome by homologous recombination. Transformation competence in V. cholerae is stimulated by increasing cell density accompanied by nutrient limitation, a decline in growth rate, or stress. The V. cholerae uptake machinery involves a competence-induced pilus, and a conserved DNA binding protein that acts as a ratchet to reel DNA into the cytoplasm. There are two models of genetic transformation, sex hypothesis and competent bacteria.

== Gallery ==
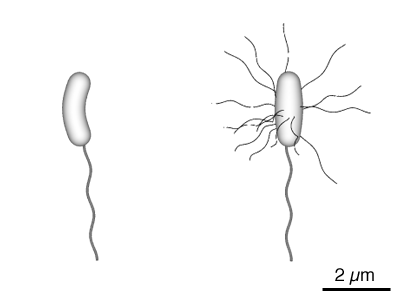
Diagram of the bacterium, V. cholerae

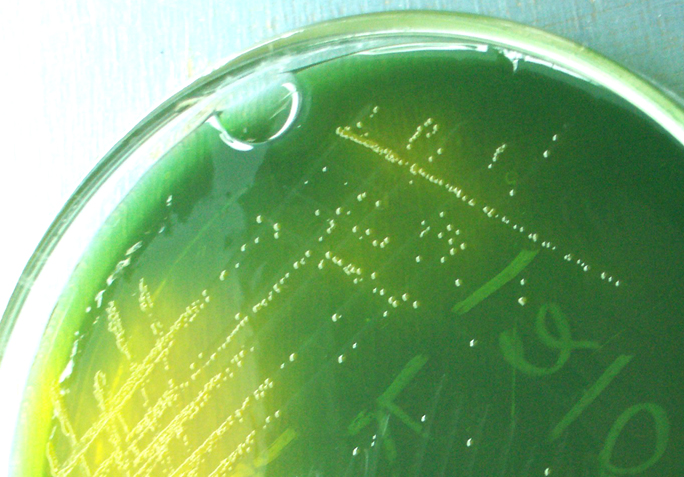
Yellow colored (sucrose-fermenting) colonies of Vibrio cholerae on TCBS agar.

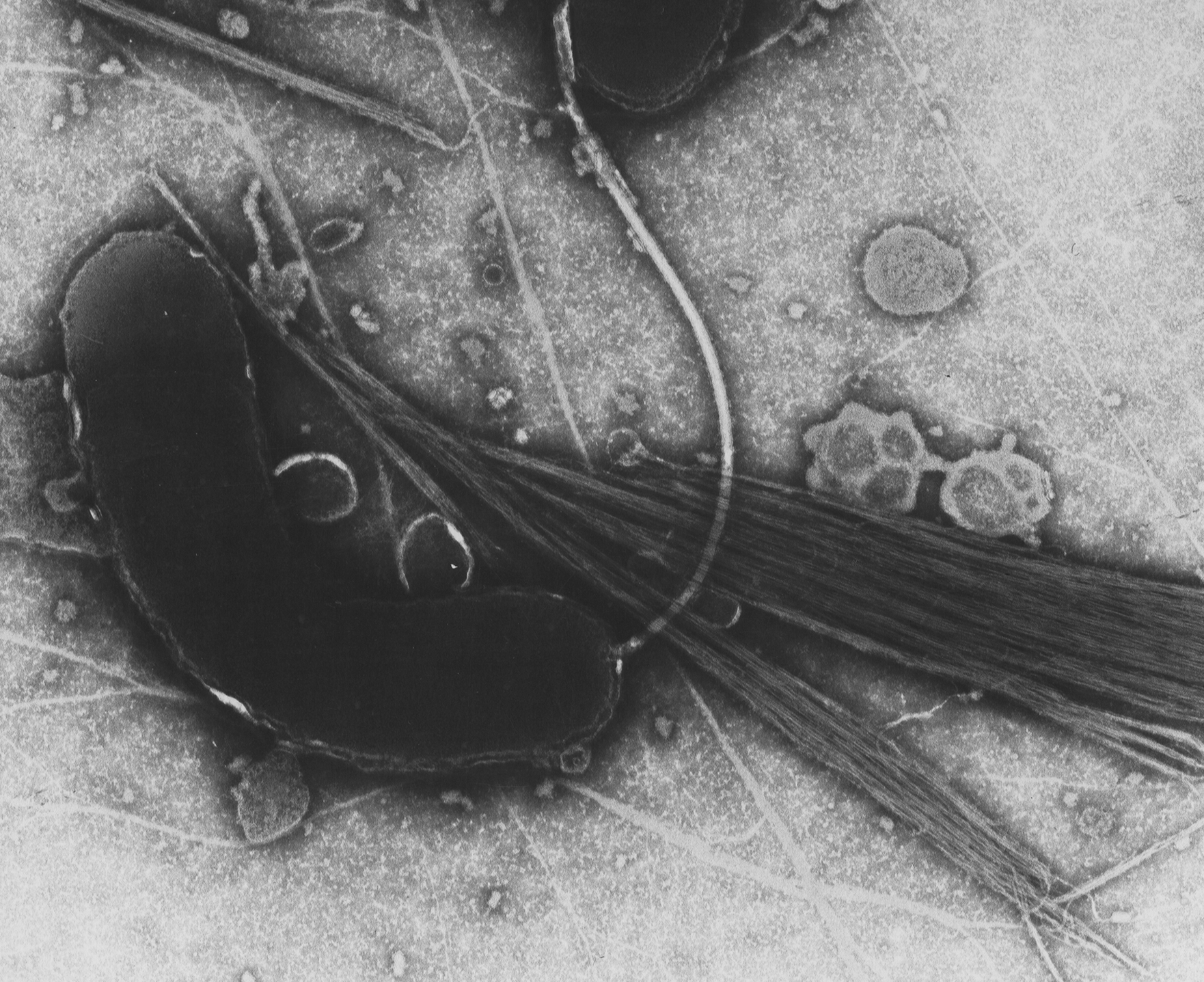
Transmission electron microscope image of Vibrio cholerae that has been negatively stained.

== See also ==
- Drinking water
- Haiti cholera outbreak
- Cholera vaccine
