= Clathrin-independent endocytosis =

Prevalent tubulovesicular membranes

Clathrin-independent endocytosis refers to the cellular process by which cells internalize extracellular molecules and particles through mechanisms that do not rely on the protein clathrin. It is involved in physiological processes such as nutrient uptake, membrane turnover, and cellular signaling.

While clathrin-coated endocytosis is the most efficient and dominant means of cellular cargo entry, endocytic pathways can operate without the presence of the clathrin triskelion. In the absence of clathrin in a plasma membrane, there are many elements of response that allow for the internalization of essential molecules for cellular function.

The induction of clathin-independent endocytosis involves physical and chemical signaling cascades to induce mechanical responses in the plasma membrane of a cell. Ligands can induce the cross linking of surface cell receptors, phosphorylation of downstream relay molecules, and membrane curvature that helps engulf and process external cargo inside the cell.

Toxins also play an important role in clathrin-independent endocytosis, causing curvature and budding from the membrane upon crosslinking of the receptors.

== Mechanisms ==
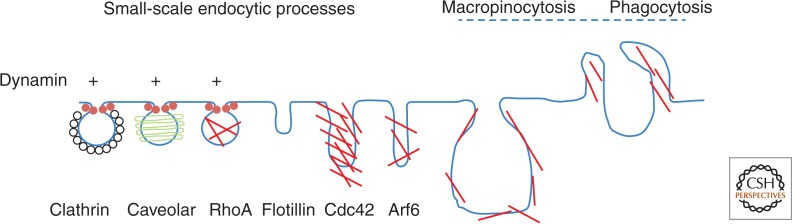
Figure 1: Methods of dynamin-dependent and independent clathrin-independent endocytosis.

The mechanisms of clathrin-independent endocytosis can be separated into dynamin-dependent and dynamin-independent. Others have their own separate pathways completely. All involve highly specialized and technical methods that recruit proteins, enzymes, etcetera to create the mechanical strength and force a cell needs to invaginate and endocytose various cargo necessary for proper cellular functions.

=== Dynamin dependent ===
==== Caveolar ====
Caveolar dynamin-dependent endocytosis relies of caveolae, which are invaginations of the cell plasma membrane made up of GPI-anchored proteins, sphingolipids, and cholesterol. A part of the cavin family, caleoles provide integral structure for the cell membrane and associates with lipids, such as cholesterol, and PIP2 to form lipid membrane rafts. In caveolar dynamin-dependent endocytosis, actin stress fibers and actin binding in response to a loss in cell adhesion help to internalize caveolae and its contents. Microtubules are stabilizes by beta-1 integrins and integrin signaling that promote the recycling of caveolae.

Using electron microscopy imaging techniques, the Cavin 1 marker is a particularly good indicator of the pathways that the caveolae vesicle takes. The dynamic nature of such vesicles show that they have a life time from 2 seconds up to 7 minutes and about 85% of cavin 1 protein was digested, indicating that the cavin-positive buds were internalized and degraded. The imaging techniques aided in research about the caveolar destiny and budding as it relates to the Cavin 1 protein.

==== RhoA-regulated ====
RhoA is a small GTPase mechanism that aids in the correct sorting of the beta chain of the interleukin-2-receptor (IL-2R-B). This pathway is known to be a key player in the dynamics of actin cytoskeleton dynamics and for recruiting actin machinery in other endocytic pathways as well. Activated RhoA is commonly coupled with Rac and the two combined cause an increase in clathrin-independent endocytosis and pinocytosis. It has recently been found that lipid rafts that contain active forms of Rac and RhoA also localize caveolae.

==== Inhibition of dynamin dependent endocytosis ====
Sphingolipids determine the efficiency of endocytic mechanisms independent of clathrin. In the event of depletion or sequestration of sphingolipids, especially cholesterol, both caveolae-mediated and RhoA-regulated endocytosis would not be able to proceed. Because lipid rafts have the ability to cluster and contain active signaling molecules, lipid rafts play and integral role in the invagination process. In the absence of such lipids, the cellular membrane environment is not appropriate for cell signaling and endocytosis.

In addition, the denaturing of temperature dependent dynamin can render dynamin dependent pathways blocked.

=== Dynamin independent ===
==== CDC42-regulated ====
CDC42 is a small, Rho family GTPase involved in the pinching off and remodeling of the cellular plasma membrane. CDC42-regulated dynamin independent pathways are the main route of non-clathrin, non-caveolar uptake of fluid-phase internalization. Most CDC42-regulated endocytic pathways have large and wide surface invaginations and sometimes involves the recruitment of actin-polymerization machinery that further aid in the pinching off of the vesicle wall.

In epithelial cells the regulation and maintenance of the apical plasma membrane is regulated by CDC42 which binds to and activates PAR6 to dictate the location and positioning of tight junctions and adherens junctions. Alternatively, CDC42 can trigger a signaling cascade via FBP17 and CIP4 that downstream can active RhoA and Rac1.

==== ARF6-regulated ====
Although an explicit role of ARF6 has not been found, the Arf family GTPase has been shown to be an essential factor in actin remodeling and regulating endosome dynamics by influencing and altering the recycling rates of various membrane components. This can lead to the infolding of the plasma membrane and uptake of external cargo. ARF6 is involved in the uptake of major histocompatibility class 1 proteins.

While it is assumed ARF6 is not needed for endocytosis, it is required for recycling. When ARF6 is inactivated, it allows for vesicle coatings to be returned to the membrane surface, but when it is over expressed or overactive, it can cause a cyclical activity that traps the cargo in the internal vesicles.

=== Fast endophilin-mediated endocytosis ===
Fast endophilin-mediated endocytosis is a form of clathrin-independent endocytosis uses cargo capture by cytolytic proteins to allow for endophilin and receptor endocytosis.

Endophilin, a BAR protein, is typically bound in distinct patches to the plasma membrane by lamellipodin. However, without receptor activation, these patches disassemble, typically within 5–10 seconds, and move to a new, random, nearby location to reassemble, The complex continues to probe the membrane until the correct ligand binds and the cargo is sorted to a FEME carrier. While the exact mechanisms by which the receptors sorts the cargo to the specific carriers, it is suggested that during cargo capture, the endphillion levels rise to be greater than the critical concentration (Cc) and initiate bending of the membrane.

As endophillin levels rise, the FEME pathway requires lipid phosphatidylinositl 3,4-bisphosphate (PI(3,4)P2) and lamellipodin that binds to the PI(3,4)P2 and SH3 domain of the leading edge on endophillin.

It may also be possible that the binding of a ligand causes receptor clustering near the binding and causes a collapse or bending of the local membrane.

FEME has the ability to internalize G-protein coupled receptors (GCPRs), receptor tyrosine kinases (RTKs), and cytokine receptors on a cell's surface.

==== CLIC/GEEC endocytic pathway ====
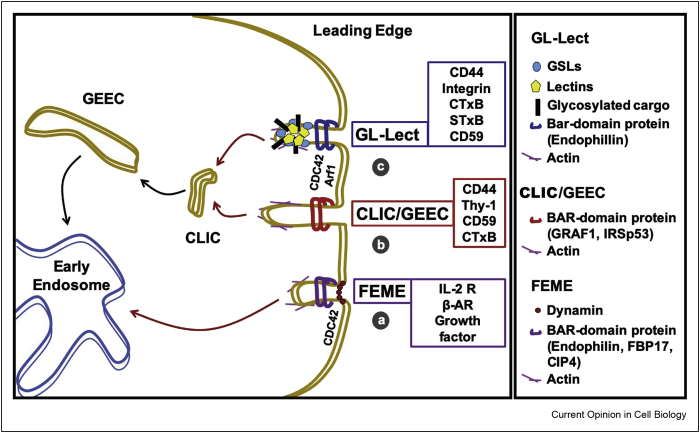
Figure 2: Clathrin-independent endocytic processes uses (a) FEME, (b) CLIC/GEEC, and (c) CL-Lect hypothesis

Clathrin-independent carriers (CLICs) are prevalent tubulovesicular membranes responsible for non-clathrin mediated endocytic events. They appear to endocytose material into GPI-anchored protein-enriched early endosomal compartment (GEECs). Collectively, CLICs and GEECs compose the Cdc42-mediated CLIC/GEEC endocytic pathway, which is regulated by GRAF1, as well as many others.

The clathrin-independent carrier pathway is the main pathway to endocytose cargo and relies heavily GPI-anchored proteins, integrins, and proteins to create membrane tension and fluidity. Crescent shaped tubular clathrin-independent carriers (CLICs) mature into glycosylphosphatidylinositol (GPI)-anchored protein-enriched early endocytic compartments(GEECs).

===== Role of glycolipid-lectin =====
Glycolipid-lectin, of the galectin family, facilitate tubular endocytic pits drive CLIC/GEEC endocytosis. Glycolipid-lectin binds onto cargo via a carbohydrate, and oligomerizes. This oligomerization allows the Glycolipid-lectin-protein-cargo complex to interact with glycosphingolipid(GSL)-binding subunits and causes a bending of the membrane. Proteins like galectin-3, galectin 8, and GSL-dependent cellular endocytosis of CD166 are all known to use Glycolipid-lectin.

==== Endophilin-A2 ====
Another pathway mediated through FEME and the use of endophilins is a toxin pathway that includes Shiga (STxB), a glycosphingolipid (GSL)-binding toxin, and cholera toxin B. These toxins have the ability to induce membrane invagination upon binding to their surface receptor. It was previously thought that cortical actin dynamics aided in the curvature upon binding. However, it is now believed that Endophilin-A2 is also a key factor in stabilization for the scission of STxxB endosomes. With the help of action and dynamin, endophilin-A2 uses microtubulue-associated motor proteins to control the rate and length of endosomal scission.

== In model organisms ==
=== Fungi ===
Fungi use a homolog of RhoA, called Rho1, to carry out a similar pathway to RhoA-regulated endocytosis. In yeast cells, Rho1 requires an effector known as Bni1 to promote actin polymerization, leading to cargo internalization.

Myo2, a type of myosin, also appears to be important for clathrin-independent endocytosis in conjunction with microtubules and microtubule-based motor proteins such as dynein and dynactin.

In fungal cells lacking Arp2/3, clathin-independent endocytosis seems to be the dominant form of endocytosis as well.

=== Plants ===
Plant cells use for clathrin-dependent and clathin-independent endocytosis to internalize membrane proteins and other cargo. Actin polymerization is required for this endocytosis, as demonstrated by the roles of Flotillin 1 (Flot1), which is a sterol and sphinoglipid enriched membrane region that collapses during invagination.
