= CCDC60 =

Protein-coding gene in humans

Identifiers
- Aliases: CCDC60, coiled-coil domain containing 60
- External IDs: MGI: 2141043; GeneCards: CCDC60

Gene location (Human)
Chr.	Chromosome 12 (human)
Band	12q24.23	Start	119,334,712 bp
Band	12q24.23	End	119,541,040 bp

Gene location (Mouse)
Chr.	Chromosome 5 (mouse)
Band	5|5 F	Start	116,262,700 bp
Band	5|5 F	End	116,427,044 bp
RNA expression pattern
Bgee	Human / Mouse (ortholog); Top expressed in: bronchial epithelial cell; right uterine tube; olfactory zone of nasal mucosa; epithelium of nasopharynx; testicle; mucosa of paranasal sinus; left testis; right testis; retinal pigment epithelium; sperm / Top expressed in: spermatid; testicle; spermatocyte; zygote; secondary oocyte; primary oocyte; vasculature; vasculature of organ; facial skeleton; urinary bladder; More reference expression data
BioGPS	n/a
Orthologs
Databases	NCBI: entry; OMA: entry
Species	Human	Mouse
Entrez	160777	269693
Ensembl	ENSG00000183273	ENSMUSG00000043913
UniProt	Q8IWA6	Q8C4J0
RefSeq (mRNA)	NM_178499	NM_177759; NM_001360004; NM_001360005
RefSeq (protein)	NP_848594	NP_808427; NP_001346933; NP_001346934
Location (UCSC)	Chr 12: 119.33 – 119.54 Mb	Chr 5: 116.26 – 116.43 Mb
PubMed search
- Wikidata
View/Edit Human	View/Edit Mouse

Coiled-coil domain containing 60 is a protein that in humans is encoded by the CCDC60 gene that is most highly expressed in the trachea, salivary glands, bladder, cervix, and epididymis.

== Gene ==
The gene that encodes CCDC60 is located on the plus strand of chromosome 12 (12q24.23) and contains 14 exons. The gene spans positions 119334712-119541047. The first record of the gene that encodes CCDC60 in the NCBI nucleotide database originated from a data set containing 15,000 human and mouse full-length cDNA sequences.

== Protein ==
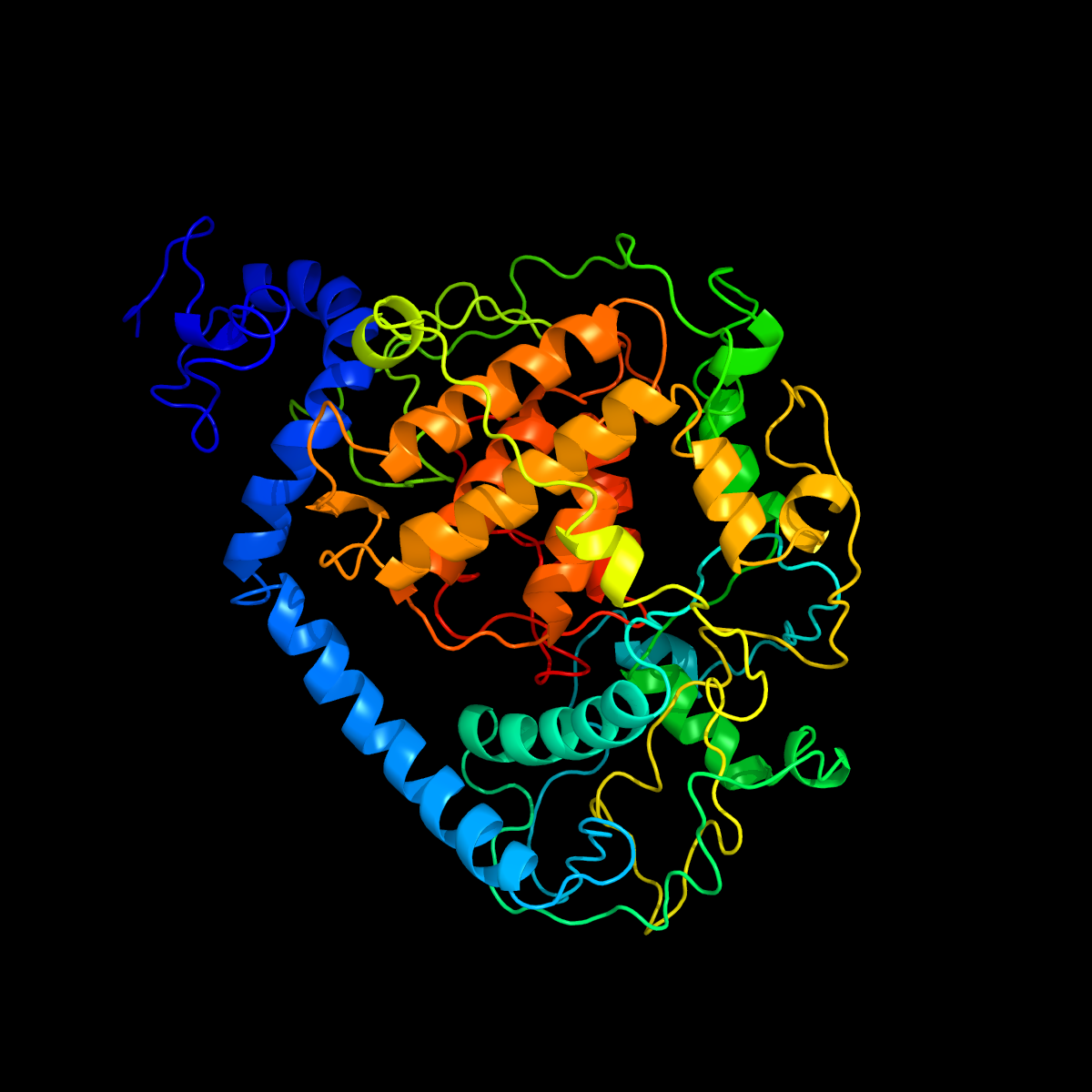
Predicted structure of CCDC60.

CCDC60 is made up of 550 amino acids. The computational isoelectric point of CCDC60 is 9.17 and the computational molecular weight is approximately 63kDa. Western blots of RT-4 and U-251 cell lines support the predicted molecular weight. The predicted subcellular location of CCDC60 is the mitochondria. The secondary structure of CCDC60 contains a namesake coiled-coil domain in addition to predicted alpha helices and coils.

== Regulation ==
=== Gene expression ===
The expression of CCDC60 is tissue-specific. CCDC60 is most highly expressed in the trachea, salivary glands, bladder, cervix, and epididymis. CCDC60 is also expressed in epithelial cells of the upper respiratory system. RNA seq data shows relatively high levels of expression in the prostate, moderate expression in the lungs and ovaries, and low expression in the colon, adrenal gland, and brain.

=== Transcription factors ===
There are many candidate transcription factors that bind to the promoter region of the gene that encodes CCDC60.

Candidate Transcription Factor Binding Sites
Family	Description
CAAT	CCAAT binding factor
XBBF	X-box binding factor
MZF1	Myeloid zinc finger 1 factor
EGRF	Wilms tumor suppressor
KLFS	Krueppel-like factor 2 (lung) (LKLF)
ZFO2	C2H2 zinc finger transcription factor 2
CALM	Calmodulin-binding transcription activator (CAMTA1, CAMTA2)
SORY	SRY (sex determining region Y)
SAL1	Spalt-like transcription factor 1
VTBP	Vertebrate TATA binding protein factor
RUSH	SWI/SNF related, actin dependent regulator of chromatin, subfamily a, member 3
ETSF	Human and murine ETS1 factors
HAND	Twist subfamily of class B bHLH transcription factor
HESF	Basic helix-loop-helix protein known as Dec2, Sharp1 or BHLHE41
ZFHX	Two-handed zinc finger homeodomain transcription factor
CART	Cart-1 (cartilage homeoprotein 1)
HEAT	Heat shock factor 2

=== Post-translational modification ===
CCDC60 is a candidate for phosphorylation by Protein kinase C. The initial methionine residue is predicted to be cleaved from the polypeptide after translation.

== Evolutionary history ==
=== Orthologs ===
The most distantly related organism in which a likely ortholog to Human CCDC60 can be found in is Amphimedon queenslandica, a sea sponge. Orthologs to Human CCDC60 are not found in any prokaryotes. Interestingly, there are no known orthologs in arthropods, although there are many other invertebrates that possess likely orthologs.

CCDC60 Orthologs
Organism	Taxonomic Group	Divergence (MYA)	Accession Number	Sequence Length	Shared Sequence Identity
Human	Hominidae	0	NP_848594.2	550	100%
Philippine tarsier	Tarsiidae	67	XP_008067500.1	559	77.29%
Gray mouse lemur	Lemuriformes	73	XP_012612137.1	548	77.60%
Yellow-bellied marmot	Rodentia	90	XP_027779037.1	559	76.32%
Sea otter	Carnivora	96	XP_022373045.1	548	84.90%
Florida Manatee	Placentalia	105	XP_004379174.1	551	83.64%
Common wombat	Marsupialia	159	XP_027721296.1	564	62.86%
Southern Ostrich	Aves	312	XP_009685824.1	489	37.03%
Bald eagle	Aves	320	XP_010573943.1	661	32.02%
High Himalaya Frog	Amphibia	352	XP_018413991.1	540	37.31%
Western clawed frog	Amphibia	352	XP_012824143.1	657	32.70%
Yellowhead Catfish	Osteichthyes	435	XP_027018543.1	577	26.93%
Whale Shark	Chondrichthyes	473	XP_020385120.1	672	34.87%
Sea Vase	Ascidiacea	676	XP_009860110.2	818	28.31%
Acorn Worm	Hemichordata	684	XP_006811258.1	733	27.87%
Pacific Purple Sea Urchin	Echinoidea	684	XP_011683370.1	791	23.76%
California two-spot octopus	Mollusca	797	XP_014780749.1	689	27.05%
Mountainous Star Coral	Cnidaria	824	XP_020617162.1	864	31.28%
Trichoplax	Placozoa	948	XP_002117053.1	1247	34.84%
Sponge	Porifera	952	XP_011405574.2	569	22.87%

=== Paralogs ===
There are no known paralogs of CCDC60.

== Protein interactions ==
There are several binary protein interactions involving CCDC60 that have been experimentally verified.

Interacting Proteins
Protein	Function	Interaction
UPF3B	Involved in nonsense-mediated decay (NMD) of mRNAs containing premature stop codons by associating with the nuclear exon junction complex (EJC) and serving as link between the EJC core and NMD machinery.	Physical Association
ZNF593	Negatively modulates the DNA binding activity of Oct-2 and therefore its transcriptional regulatory activity.	Physical Association
FAM32A	Isoform 1, but not isoform 2 or isoform 3, may induce G2 arrest and apoptosis.	Physical Association
RBM42	Binds (via the RRM domain) to the 3'-untranslated region (UTR) of CDKN1A mRNA.	Physical Association
DCP1B	May play a role in the degradation of mRNAs, both in normal mRNA turnover and in nonsense-mediated mRNA decay.	Physical Association
EGFR	Receptor tyrosine kinase binding ligands of the EGF family and activating several signaling cascades to convert extracellular cues into appropriate cellular responses.	Physical Association
FAM204A	Unknown function.	Physical Association
APP	Functions as a cell surface receptor and performs physiological functions on the surface of neurons relevant to neurite growth, neuronal adhesion and axonogenesis.	Direct Interaction
MTUS2	Binds microtubules. Together with MAPRE1 may target the microtubule depolymerase KIF2C to the plus-end of microtubules.	Direct Interaction
B9D1	Component of the tectonic-like complex, a complex localized at the transition zone of primary cilia and acting as a barrier that prevents diffusion of transmembrane proteins between the cilia and plasma membranes.	Direct Interaction

== Clinical significance ==
Mutations in CCDC60 have been associated with decreased walking speed. Additionally, CCDC60 is one of many candidate genes that has been associated with diagnosis of schizophrenia in genome-wide study.
