= David Teece =

New Zealand–American business academic

David J. Teece CNZM
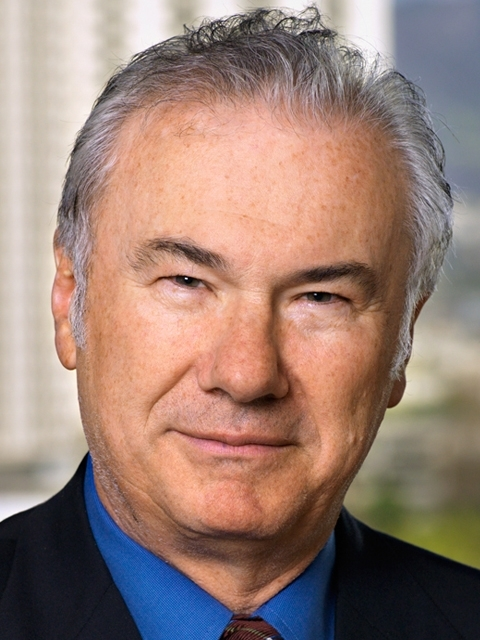
- Born: September 2, 1948 (age 78); Blenheim, New Zealand
- Education: University of Canterbury, MCom; University of Pennsylvania, MA, PhD
- Scientific career
- Fields: Corporate Strategy, entrepreneurship, innovation, international management, competition policy
- Workplaces: Berkeley Research Group; University of California, Berkeley Haas School of Business
- Doctoral advisor: Edwin Mansfield
- Website: www.davidjteece.com

David John Teece (born September 2, 1948) is a New Zealand-born US-based organizational economist who is a professor of the graduate school and director of the Tusher Center for the Management of Intellectual Capital at the Walter A. Haas School of Business at the University of California, Berkeley. As of 2024, he is a Distinguished Scholar of Strategy and Innovation at the University of South Florida Muma College of Business. He is known for his "Dynamic Capabilities" framework and "Profiting from Innovation" model.

Teece is the cofounder of Berkeley Research Group, an expert services and consulting firm headquartered in Washington, DC. His areas of interest include corporate strategy, entrepreneurship, innovation, competition policy, and intellectual property.

In 2021, Teece was awarded Clarivate Laureate status in Economics for his contributions to innovation, entrepreneurship, and competition. As of 2026, Teece’s published work has been cited more than 280,000 times according to Google Scholar.

== Early life and education ==
Teece grew up in Blenheim and Nelson, New Zealand and attended Waimea College before enrolling in 1967 at the University of Canterbury in Christchurch, where he earned a bachelor's degree and a Master of Commerce.

He moved to the United States to attend the Wharton School of the University of Pennsylvania, from which he received a Ph.D. in economics, specializing in industrial economics, international trade, and technological innovation. Two members of the economics faculty had a particular influence on his research that he later acknowledged in articles he wrote in tribute to each of them: Edwin Mansfield, a pioneer in the study of industrial R&D and the economics of technological change; and Oliver Williamson, Nobel Laureate and creator of Transaction Cost Economics.

== Career ==
Teece taught at Stanford Graduate School of Business from 1975 until 1982, when he was hired by the Haas School of Business at U.C. Berkeley, where he is a chaired professor. He has published more than 200 academic articles and more than a dozen books. He co-founded and serves on the editorial board of three academic journals, Industrial & Corporate Change (Oxford University Press), Russian Management Journal, and the Journal of Dynamic Competition. He is also the executive director of Berkeley Policy Institute, a nonprofit research organization.

== Personal life ==
After the 2011 Christchurch earthquake, Teece offered a substantial donation to the city for earthquake recovery. The money was used by his former university to install the classics and music school in the Old Chemistry building at the Christchurch Arts Centre. In 2017, 40 years after its move from the Christchurch Central City to the Ilam campus, the University of Canterbury returned to its original home, and opened The Teece Museum of Classical Antiques in May 2017. The Townsend Teece restored telescope has been restored for placement in the university's observatory in Christchurch.

Teece resides in Florida.

== Research areas ==
=== Capturing value from innovation ===
Teece has made contributions to the study of innovation. Teece's 1986 paper "Profiting from Technological Innovation" was selected by the editors as one of the best papers published in Research Policy from 1971 to 1991 and is the most cited paper published in the publication. In October 2006, Research Policy published a special issue commemorating the twentieth anniversary of the original article.

In this series of papers, Teece explained why innovative firms often fail to capture economic returns from their invention. He described how it is sometimes more important for a business to be able to win at marketing, distribution, manufacturing, and other complementary areas than to come up with a big idea in the first place. He identified the factors which determine whether the firm that wins from innovation is the firm that is first to market, a follower firm, or a firm that has related capabilities that the innovation requires to provide value to a customer. The key elements in what has been called the Teece Model are the imitability of the innovation (how easily competitors can copy it) and the ownership of complementary assets. Sidney Winter has argued that Teece's paper contributes "en passant but fundamentally, to the clarification of basic questions."

=== Dynamic capabilities ===
Teece wrote the first paper on dynamic capabilities, an economics approach to the theory of the firm. Dynamic capabilities have been defined as "the ability to integrate, build, and reconfigure internal and external competencies to address rapidly changing environments".

According to ScienceWatch, his paper with Gary Pisano and Amy Shuen, "Dynamic Capabilities and Strategic Management", was the most cited paper in economics and business globally for the period from 1995 to 2005.

Teece's concept of dynamic capabilities is a theory about the foundations of competitive advantage: "the capacity (1) to sense and shape opportunities and threats, (2) to seize opportunities, and (3) to maintain competitiveness through enhancing, combining, protecting, and, when necessary, reconfiguring the business enterprise's intangible and tangible assets."

=== Theory of the multiproduct firm ===
Roberts and Saloner (2013) credit Teece with "the first attempt to build a systematic theory of the firm scope based on profit-maximizing behavior" in his 1982 article "Towards an Economic Theory of the Multiproduct Firm," in which Teece describes the existence of excess resources in firms, stating that firms could better use those resources by diversifying into new lines of business. He also presents transaction cost arguments regarding whether resources can be shared contractually, and explains that protecting those resources is a potential basis for diversification. Teece additionally builds on Williamson (1975) in arguing that "internal capital allocation may be better than what the market can achieve".

== Dynamic competition ==
For over three decades Teece has criticized antitrust and competition economics for its failure to consider the power of innovation driven broad spectrum dynamic competition. Teece tweaks the sources of economic rents down more finely, and believes Schumpeterian and Ricardian rents are generally benign from an antitrust perspective. This is seen to be "a very valuable insight" that is counter to traditional antitrust enforcement. He is recognized for persistently alerting regulatory bodies to the different nature of competition in the innovation economy compared to the industrial economy. As of 2026, Teece is the co-editor of the Journal of Dynamic Competition.

== Panmure House Declaration ==
Teece invited and organized the "New Enlightenment Conference" in Panmure House, the original home of Adam Smith in Edinburgh, Scotland, July 2019. The conference participants signed the Panmure House Declaration, "the first major pronouncement from Adam Smith's home since 1790." It called for a stronger commitment to Adam Smith's values of economic freedom and a rule-of-law democracy, and the pursuit of the common good. Teece became the inaugural Adam Smith scholar in residence in Panmure House.

== Honors ==
Teece holds nine honorary doctorates: Saint Petersburg State University (Russia, 2000), where he was honored for his role in co-founding the business school; Copenhagen Business School (Denmark, 2004); Lappeenranta University of Technology (Finland, 2004); University of Canterbury (New Zealand, 2007);University of Calgary (Canada, 2015); Kaunas University of Technology (Lithuania, 2016); European Business School (Germany, 2016); Edinburgh Business School (United Kingdom, 2017); Keio University (Japan, 2023). He is also an honorary professor at China's Zhongnan University of Economics and Law and King Saud University in Saudi Arabia and an Honorary Member of the Law and Economics Association of New Zealand. In 2002, Accenture listed Teece among its Top 50 Business Intellectuals. In 2003, Lappeenranta University presented Teece with the first Viipuri International Prize in Strategic (Technology) Management and Business Economics.

A 2008 analysis by Thomson Scientific found him to be one of the top-10 most-cited scholars in economics and business from 1997 to 2007.

In 2011 he received the Herbert Simon award from Laszlo College for Advanced Studies, Corvinus University of Budapest. A 2011 article, "Innovation in Multi-Invention Contexts," coauthored with Deepak Somaya and Simon Wakeman, was selected as the winner of the 2012 California Management Review Best Article Award.

In the 2013 New Year Honours, Teece was appointed a Companion of the New Zealand Order of Merit, for services to New Zealand–United States relations. He also received the Academy of International Business Eminent Scholar Award in Istanbul in July 2013. Teece is described as a " 'leading authority' on matters related to antitrust and competition policy and intellectual property stating and is 'highly sought after.'"

In 2016, the New Zealand Association of Economists awarded him as Distinguished Fellow, "renowned for his research on industrial organisation, technological change and innovation, particularly as it relates to competition policy and intellectual property."

In 2018, the Strategic Management Society awarded him the CK Prahalad Distinguished Scholar-Practitioner Award and classified him as "a renowned academic, a prolific author, an active consultant, serial entrepreneur, angel investor and CEO mentor."

In 2020 he was ranked as the world's most-cited scholar in the combined field of business and management in an analysis of science-wide author citations published in PLOS Biology, a peer-reviewed journal. He was also inducted into the Thinkers50 Hall of Fame.

In 2022, Teece was elected an honorary Fellow of the Royal Society of New Zealand.

== Political views ==
Teece has not publicly stated his political views, though he chaired Californians for a Balanced Budget and Better Economy, a PAC that supported Tom Campbell's 2012 run for U.S. Senate.

His largest political donation was $500,000 to Californians for a Balanced Budget and Better Economy. In recent election cycles he has donated to several Republican senators' campaigns, including Susan Collins, Mitt Romney, Tom Cotton, Lisa Murkowski, and Dan Sullivan.

== Selected publications ==
- "Profiting from Technological Innovation," Research Policy 15:6 (December 1986), 285– 305.
- Teece, David; Jorde, Thomas, eds. (1992). Antitrust, Innovation and Competitiveness. Oxford University Press.
- "Dynamic capabilities and strategic management" (with Gary Pisano and Amy Shuen), Strategic Management Journal 18: 509-533. (1997).
- Economic Performance and the Theory of the Firm: The Selected Papers of David Teece. Vol. 1 and 2. Edward Elgar Publishing. 1998.
- Managing Intellectual Capital: Organizational, Strategic, and Policy Dimensions. Oxford University Press. 2000.
- "Reflections on 'Profiting from Innovation,'" Research Policy 35:8 (December 2006), 1131–1146.
- The Transfer and Licensing of Know-How and Intellectual Property: Understanding the Multinational Enterprise in the Modern World. World Scientific Publishing. 2008.
- Technological Know-How, Organizational Capabilities and Strategic Management. World Scientific Publishing. 2008.
- Dynamic Capabilities and Strategic Management: Organizing for Innovation and Growth, Oxford University Press (2009).
- Strategy, Innovation and the Theory of the Firm. Edward Elgar. 2012.
- "A Dynamic Capabilities-Based Entrepreneurial Theory of the Multinational Enterprise," Journal of International Business Studies 45:1 (2014).
- "Profiting from Innovation in the Digital Economy: Enabling Technologies, Standards, and Licensing Models in the Wireless World," Research Policy (2018).
- "Innovating Big Tech Firms and Competition Policy: Favoring Dynamic Over Static Competition" (with Nicolas Petit), Industrial and Corporate Change (2021).
- "Ecosystem leadership as a dynamic capability" (with Nicolai J. Foss and Jens Schmidt), Long range planning, 56:1 (2023).
- "Big Tech and Strategic Management: How Management Scholars Can Inform Competition Policy," Academy of Management Perspectives (2023).
- Dynamic Capabilities and Related Paradigms, Cambridge University Press (2025).
- Dynamic Capabilities: Foundational Concepts, Cambridge University Press (2025).
- "The multinational enterprise, capabilities, and digitalization: governance and growth with world disorder," Journal of International Business Studies 56:1 (2025).
- Dynamic Universities: How Strategic, Entrepreneurial Leaders Can Strengthen Higher Education, Cambridge University Press (forthcoming, 2026).
