= Ro-318220 =

Names
- Preferred IUPAC name 3-{3-[4-(1-Methyl-1H-indol-3-yl)-2,5-dioxo-2,5-dihydro-1H-pyrrol-3-yl]-1H-indol-1-yl}propyl carbamimidothioate

Identifiers
CAS Number	125314-64-9
3D model (JSmol)	Interactive image
ChEBI	CHEBI:38912
ChEMBL	ChEMBL6291
ChemSpider	4905
PubChem CID	5083
UNII	W9A0B5E78O
CompTox Dashboard (EPA)	DTXSID20154736
- InChI: InChI=1S/C25H23N5O2S/c1-29-13-17(15-7-2-4-9-19(15)29)21-22(24(32)28-23(21)31)18-14-30(11-6-12-33-25(26)27)20-10-5-3-8-16(18)20/h2-5,7-10,13-14H,6,11-12H2,1H3,(H3,26,27)(H,28,31,32) Key: DSXXEELGXBCYNQ-UHFFFAOYSA-N; InChI=1/C25H23N5O2S/c1-29-13-17(15-7-2-4-9-19(15)29)21-22(24(32)28-23(21)31)18-14-30(11-6-12-33-25(26)27)20-10-5-3-8-16(18)20/h2-5,7-10,13-14H,6,11-12H2,1H3,(H3,26,27)(H,28,31,32) Key: DSXXEELGXBCYNQ-UHFFFAOYAO
- SMILES: Cn1cc(C2=C(C(=O)NC2=O)c3cn(CCCSC(=N)N)c4ccccc34)c5ccccc15

Properties
Chemical formula	C_{25}H_{23}N_{5}O_{2}S
Molar mass	457.55 g·mol^{−1}
- Except where otherwise noted, data are given for materials in their standard state (at 25 °C [77 °F], 100 kPa). Infobox references

Ro-318220 is a protein kinase C (PKC) inhibitor of the bisindolylmaleimide class.
