= RAP6 =

RAP6 is the abbreviation for Rab5-activating protein 6, a novel endosomal protein with a role in endocytosis. RAP6 was discovered by Alejandro Barbieri and his group of researchers (Christine Hunker, Adriana Galvis, Ivan Kruk, Hugo Giambini, Lina Torres and Maria Luisa Veisaga) working at Florida International University.

This novel human protein has been reported to be involved in membrane trafficking. It has been shown that RAP6 has a guanine nucleotide exchange factor (GEF) activity specific to Rab5 and a GTPase activating protein (GAP) activity specific to RAS.

The original GenBank Identifications (GIs) have been published in the NCBI Nucleotide databases with GIs 77176718 and 77176720. Since then, many names have been coined to the validated protein such as RabGEF1, GeneID: 27342. RAP6 belongs to the family of the GAPVD1, GeneID: 26130
