= Enzastaurin =

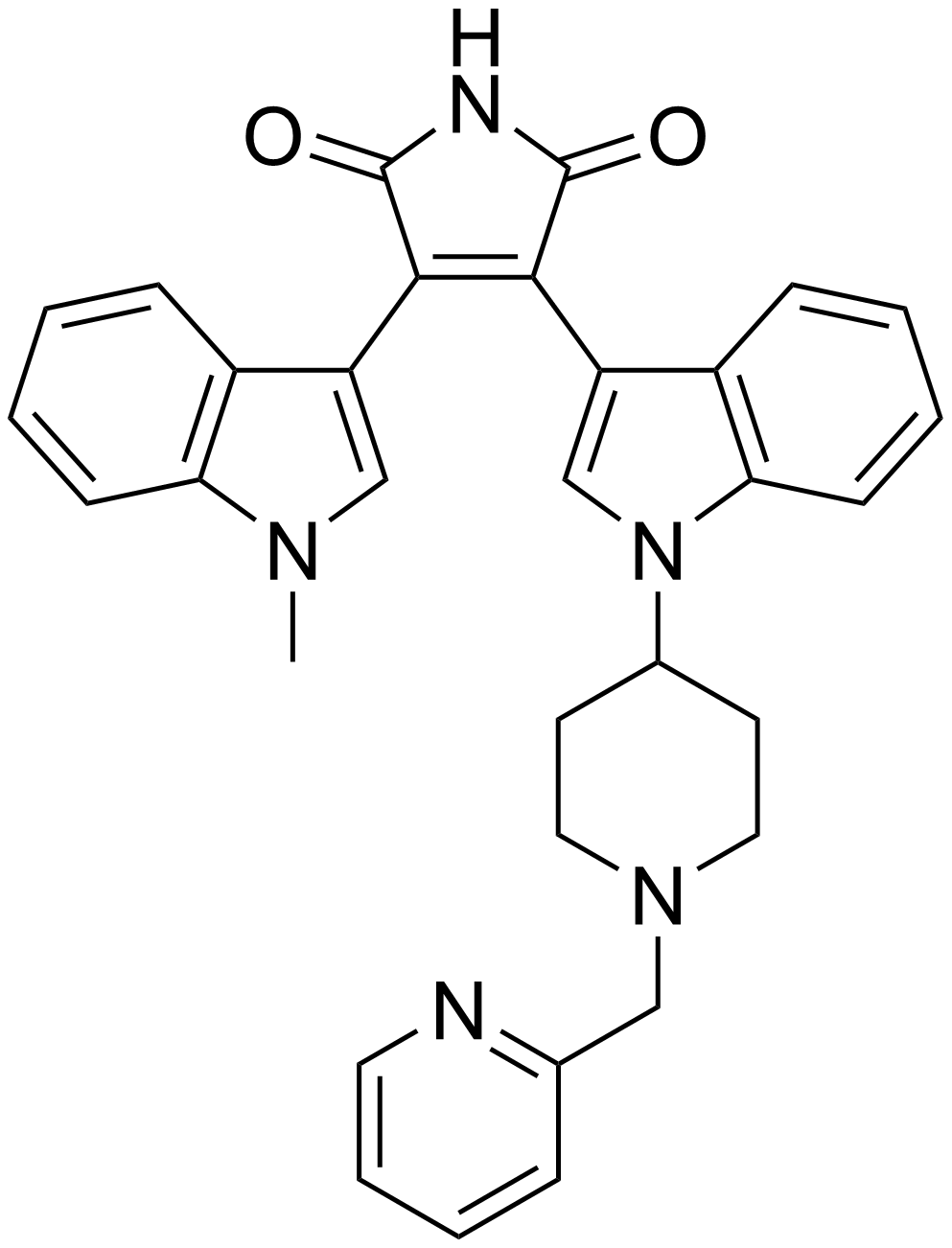

Names
- Preferred IUPAC name 3-(1-Methyl-1H-indol-3-yl)-4-(1-{1-[(pyridin-2-yl)methyl]piperidin-4-yl}-1H-indol-3-yl)-1H-pyrrole-2,5-dione
- Other names LY-317615

Identifiers
| CAS Number | 170364-57-5 |
| 3D model (JSmol) | Interactive image |
| ChEMBL | ChEMBL300138 |
| ChemSpider | 153463 |
| ECHA InfoCard | 100.233.143 |
| IUPHAR/BPS | 5693 |
| KEGG | D11935 |
| PubChem CID | 176167 |
| UNII | UC96G28EQF |
| CompTox Dashboard (EPA) | DTXSID5044029 |
- InChI: InChI=1S/C32H29N5O2/c1-35-19-25(23-9-2-4-11-27(23)35)29-30(32(39)34-31(29)38)26-20-37(28-12-5-3-10-24(26)28)22-13-16-36(17-14-22)18-21-8-6-7-15-33-21/h2-12,15,19-20,22H,13-14,16-18H2,1H3,(H,34,38,39) Key: AXRCEOKUDYDWLF-UHFFFAOYSA-N; InChI=1/C32H29N5O2/c1-35-19-25(23-9-2-4-11-27(23)35)29-30(32(39)34-31(29)38)26-20-37(28-12-5-3-10-24(26)28)22-13-16-36(17-14-22)18-21-8-6-7-15-33-21/h2-12,15,19-20,22H,13-14,16-18H2,1H3,(H,34,38,39) Key: AXRCEOKUDYDWLF-UHFFFAOYAP
- SMILES: O=C3C(\c2c1ccccc1n(c2)C)=C(/C(=O)N3)c5c4ccccc4n(c5)C7CCN(Cc6ncccc6)CC7

Properties
| Chemical formula | C_{32}H_{29}N_{5}O_{2} |
| Molar mass | 515.617 g·mol^{−1} |
- Except where otherwise noted, data are given for materials in their standard state (at 25 °C [77 °F], 100 kPa). verify (what is ?) Infobox references

Enzastaurin is a synthetic bisindolylmaleimide with potential antineoplastic activity. Binding to the ATP-binding site, enzastaurin selectively inhibits protein kinase C beta, an enzyme involved in the induction of vascular endothelial growth factor (VEGF)-stimulated neo-angiogenesis. This agent may decrease tumor blood supply, preventing growth.

== Trials ==
In 2013 it failed a phase III clinical trial by Lilly for lymphoma.

In July 2022, there was another phase III trial called PREVEnt by Aytu BioPharma to look into the effectiveness of enzastaurin for the treatment of Vascular Elhers-Danlos syndrome (vEDS). The trial was later indefinitely suspended in October 2022 to save costs.
