= Eisosome =

Eisosomes ('eis' meaning into or portal and 'soma', meaning body) are large, heterodimeric, immobile protein complexes at the plasma membrane which mark the site of endocytosis in some eukaryotes, and were discovered in the yeast Saccharomyces cerevisiae in 2006. Currently, seven genes: Pil1, Lsp1 and Sur7, Eis1, Seg1 and Ygr130C, Seg2, are annotated to the formation of the proteins identified in eisosomes. These organelle-like structures have put to rest the idea that sites of endocytosis in cells are chosen at random. Eisosomes have a profound role in regulating plasma membrane architecture and organization in yeast. Microscopic and genetic analyses link these stable, ultrastructural assemblies to the endocytosis of both lipid and protein cargoes in cells.

There are approximately 50–100 eisosomes in each mature yeast cell distributed uniformly across the cell surface periphery in a characteristic dotted pattern with each eisosome containing approximately 2000–5000 copies of Pil1 and Lsp1 proteins, as well as, integral membrane protein Sur7. Only a few of the eisosomes present in a cell are active at any one time, suggesting that eisosomes function by using reversible phosphorylation and are regulated portals that govern both location and magnitude of membrane traffic into the cell.

== Endocytosis in yeast ==
The yeast plasma membrane consists of three compartments:

- Membrane compartment containing Can1 (MCC)
- Membrane compartment containing Pma1 (MCP)
- Membrane compartment containing TORC2 (MCT)

The MCC, a furrow in the plasma membrane, is generated by eisosomes, it disappears in a cell lacking Pil1 which is one of the main eisosome components.

== Structural classification ==
These are large protein complexes composed primarily of subunits of two Bin-Amphiphysin-RVS (BAR) domain containing proteins Pil1 and Lsp1. These two paralogue proteins self-assemble in higher order structure helices and bind preferentially to phosphoinositide-containing membrane. It is also found that eisosome associated proteins Slm1 and Slm 2 have F-BAR domains that are used for targeting furrow like plasma membrane invagination.

- (BAR) Bin-Amphiphysin-RVS
- Slm1 Phosphoinositide PI4,5P(2) binding protein, forms a complex with Slm2p; acts downstream of Mss4p in a pathway regulating actin cytoskeleton organization in response to stress; phosphorylated by the TORC2 complex
- Slm2 Phosphoinositide PI4,5P(2) binding protein, forms a complex with Slm1p; acts downstream of Mss4p in a pathway regulating actin cytoskeleton organization in response to stress; phosphorylated by the TORC2 complex
- Pil1 PI(4,5)P2 abbreviation for Phosphorylation Inhibited by Long chain bases
- Lsp 1 LSP1 abbreviation for Long chain bases Stimulate Phosphorylation
- TORC2 abbreviation for target of rapamycin complex 2)
