= Complementary assets =

Resources that enhance the value or usability of another asset when used together

Complementary assets are assets that when owned together increase the value of the combined assets. It is defined as “the total economic value added by combining certain complementary factors in a production system, exceeding the value that would be generated by applying these production factors in isolation.” Thus two assets are said to be complements when investment in one asset increases the marginal return on the other. On the contrary, assets are substitutes when investment in one does not affect the marginal return of the other.

The production process is described by the production function $F(x,y)$, where $x$ and $y$ are the amounts invested of the two assets, then it is possible to define formally the elasticity of substitution as

$$\sigma_{xy}=\frac{d \ln (y/x) }{d \ln (MRT_{12})}
=\frac{d \ln (y/x) }{d \ln (F_{x}/F_{y})}$$

If $\sigma_{xy}$ is equal to 1, the assets are substitutes; if lower, complements; if higher antagonists.

== Strategy ==
In the field of strategy, the concept is sometimes understood to apply to assets, infrastructure or capabilities needed to support the successful commercialization and marketing of a technological innovation, other than those assets fundamentally associated with that innovation. The term was first coined by David Teece. Key empirical studies on complementary assets were conducted by Frank T. Rothaermel.

Complementary assets are broken down into three general types:

1. Generic assets: "general purpose" assets which do not need to be tailored to a particular innovation;
2. Specialized assets: unilateral dependence between the innovation and the complementary asset;
3. Cospecialized assets: bilateral dependence between the innovation and the complementary asset.

Complementary assets, among other factors, are important for organizations wishing to commercialize and profit from an innovation. Firms will accordingly aim to acquire and sustain complementary assets, in order to strengthen a firm's asset base in particular in the light of innovation.

== Examples ==
New biotechnology firms often lack the complementary assets to commercialize their innovations and thus form collaborative partnerships with large incumbent firms who do possess the necessary complementary assets such as manufacturing capabilities, marketing channels, brand name, etc. (Rothaermel, 2001)

RC Cola was the first firm to commercialize both diet cola and cola in a can. However, rivals Coca-Cola and Pepsi soon imitated this and beat RC Cola out of the market based on their superior marketing capabilities and brand name recognition, i.e. their complementary assets (Teece, 1986) .

It has also been demonstrated that competencies in process innovation and implementation moderate the extent to which a firm's environmental management competencies create a cost advantage.

== Antagonistic Assets ==
The opposite of complementary assets are called antagonistic assets. These are defined as a combination of resources that jointly reduce value from the implementation of other resources. In other words, a firm strategy combining antagonistic assets produces an effect smaller than the sum of the individual effects of each resource.
