= Clathrin-independent carrier =

Prevalent tubulovesicular membranes

Clathrin-independent carriers (CLICs) are prevalent tubulovesicular membranes responsible for non-clathrin mediated endocytic events. They appear to endocytose material into GPI-anchored protein-enriched early endosomal compartment (GEECs). Collectively, CLICs and GEECs comprise the Cdc42-mediated CLIC/GEEC endocytic pathway, which is regulated by GRAF1.

Each of RhoA, Arf6, or Cdc42 has the capacity to modulate one of the three distinct clathrin-independent endocytic (CIE) pathways. Within the CIE pathway controlled by Cdc42, CLICs serve as the primary carriers facilitating uptake. The CLIC pathway encompasses scission of the plasma membrane (PM) independent of dynamin, dependence on Arf1 activity, enrichment in GPI-anchored proteins, increased susceptibility to cholesterol depletion, and substantial participation in the internalization of cholera toxin B subunit (CTxB) and fluid. CLICs merge with early endosomes after they undergo maturation into the GEEC along with the attachment of Rab5 and EEA-1.
