= Fast endophilin-mediated endocytosis =

Endocytic pathway found in eukaryotic cells

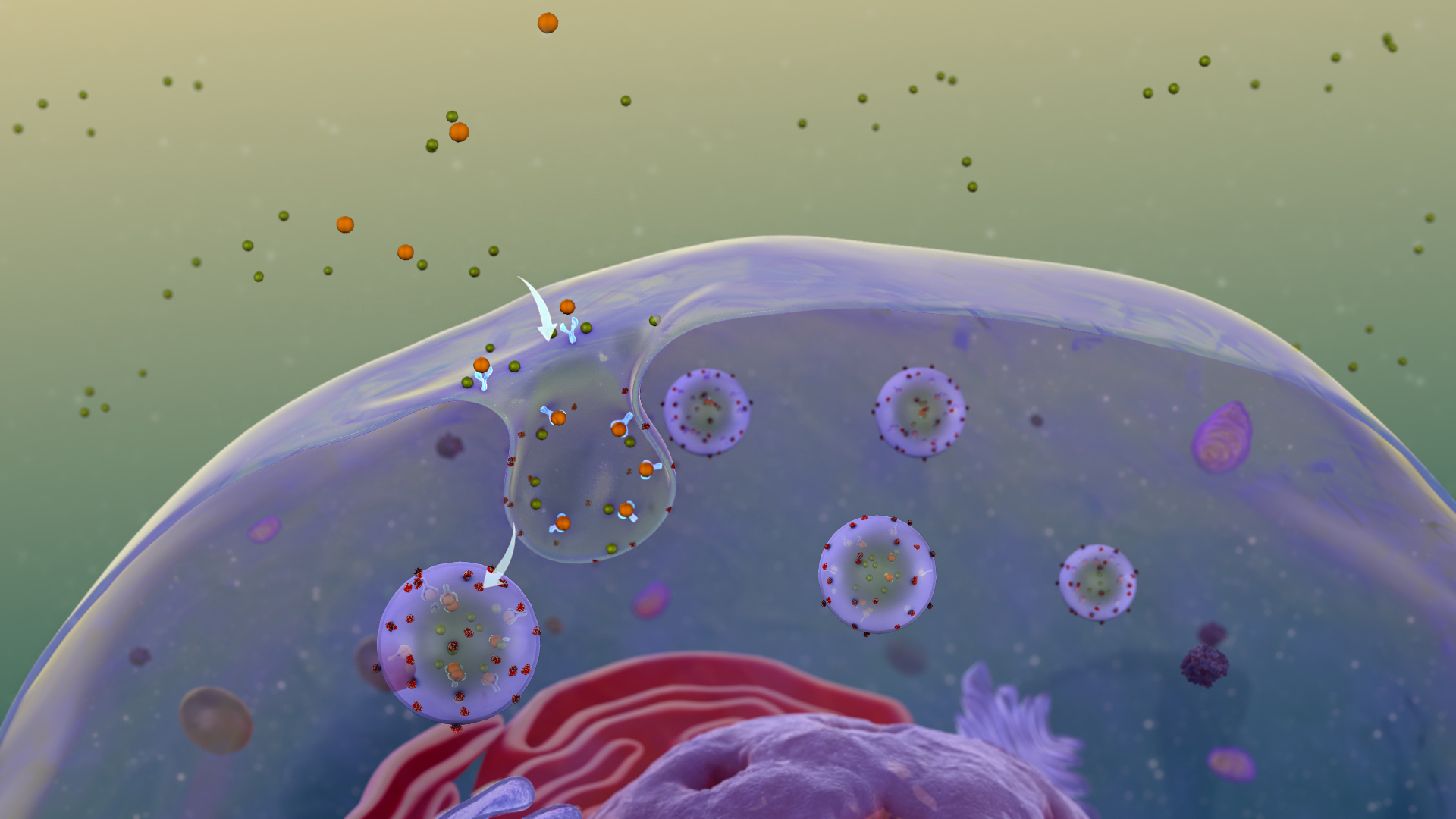
Receptor Mediated Endocytosis.

Fast endophilin-mediated endocytosis (FEME) is an endocytic pathway found in eukaryotic cells. FEME is a type of receptor mediated endocytosis however it does not require clathrin. Instead, FEME is a clathrin-independent endocytic pathway that requires the activity of endophilins and dynamins.

In Clathrin-dependent endocytic pathways, endosomes budding from the cell membrane into the cell will form in clathrin pits, and be coated by clathrin triskelions. In FEME however, endosomes form when coated by actin, and internalise endophilin A2.

== Function and importance ==
=== Regulation of cell signaling ===
FEME allows the rapid endocytosis of receptors such as G-Protein Coupled Receptors (GPCRs) & Receptor Tyrosine Kinases. These receptors play an essential role in the regulation of cell signaling. After rapid endocytosis of these receptors via FEME, these receptors are sorted into endosomes to be either permanently destroyed or recycled back to the plasma membrane, which can influence whether or not the cell is desensitized for a long period of time.

=== Cell migration ===
FEME may also play a role in cell migration. The enrichment of endophilin on the leading edge of cells suggests that FEME could be involved in this mechanism.

== Key characteristics of FEME ==
According to an article titled "Molecular mechanism of Fast Endophilin-Mediated Endocytosis" published in the Biochemical Journal in 2020, there are 8 key characteristics of FEME.

=== FEME is not constantly active ===
FEME is not a constantly ongoing process within the cell. Instead, FEME is triggered when receptors are activated by their associated ligands. This an activation occurs within a matter of seconds, hence the name fast endophilin-mediated endocytosis.

=== Endophilin aggregation must occur before receptor activation ===
Endophilin must aggregate into "discrete clusters" on the plasma membrane of a cell before the receptors are activated in order for FEME to occur. In other words, FEME will not occur when endophilin is not present, even if receptors are being activated. If endophilin is not present, receptors will either accumulate on the cell surface or be transported into the cell using another type of endocytic pathway.

=== FEME occurs at different locations of the cell ===
FEME notably occurs on the leading edge of cells, where it is associated with cell migration. However, FEME is not restricted to the leading edge of cells. In cells with no leading edge, such as confluent cells, FEME can occur on the basal and dorsal surfaces of cells as well.

=== FEME carriers retain their endophilin coat after budding ===
FEME carriers are microscopic proteins located in the cytosol of a cell. FEME carriers are pleiotropic, meaning that they this one protein has many effects on the characteristics of the cell. FEME carriers retain their Endophilin coat until they fuse with early endosomes, which is a key difference from Clathrin-mediated endocytosis which loses its clathrin coat directly after budding.

=== FEME transports a wide variety of cargoes ===
FEME is known to transport an array of 16 different cargoes to date.

1. β1 adrenergic receptors
2. α2a adrenergic receptors
3. Dopamine receptor 3
4. Dopamine receptor 4
5. Muscarinic Acetylcholine receptor 4
6. EGFR
7. HGFR
8. VEGFR
9. PDGFR
10. NGFR
11. IGFR
12. Tetrameric IL2R
13. PlexinA1
14. ROBO1
15. Cholera toxins
16. Shiga toxins

=== FEME membrane scission requires 3 different proteins ===
Membrane scission is the process by which the membrane of a budding vesicle is divided into two. In the context of FEME, membrane scission requires the combined actions of Endophilin, Dynamin, and actin.

=== FEME carriers move in a retrograde fashion ===
FEME carriers move backwards, or retrogradely, down microtubules. This process is "powered" by Dynein, an ATPase belonging to the AAA+ superfamily. Dynein facilitates the intracellular transport of cargoes towards the minus end of the microtubule. This process of moving towards the minus end is called retrograde transport, which is the opposite of anterograde transport, which moves toward the plus-end of a microtubule.

=== Cdk5 & GSK4β regulate FEME ===
Cdk5 and GSK3β play an active role in the negative regulation of FEME. Negative regulation occurs when the activation of one protein inhibits the action of another. When Cdk5 & GSK4β are activated, they inhibit the recruitment of Dynein.

== Mechanism ==
Alessandra Casamento and Emmanuel Boucrot break down the mechanism of FEME into 6 key concepts in their article titled "Molecular mechanism of Fast Endophilin-Mediated Endocytosis" published in the Biochemical Journal in 2020: Priming, Cargo Selection, Membrane Curvature and carrier formation, Membrane scission, Cytosolic Transport, and Regulatory mechanisms.

== Associated proteins ==
=== Receptor tyrosine kinases ===
Kinases are enzymes that add a phosphate to a protein, also known as phosphorylating a protein. Kinases have antagonistic functions to phosphatases, which remove a phosphate from a protein. Receptor tyrosine kinases are a family of proteins that facilitate communication between cells by utilizing tyrosine phosphorylation. EGFR, HGFR, VEGFR, PDGFR, NGFR, IGFR are types of receptor tyrosine kinases that are associated with FEME.

Endophilin, Lamellipodin and Mena cooperate to regulate F actin dependent EGF receptor endocytosis.

- EGFR
- HGFR
- VEGFR
- PDGFR
- NGFR
- IGF1R

=== Lipid phosphatases ===
Phosphatases are enzymes that remove a phosphate from a protein, also known as dephosphorylating a protein. Phosphatases have antagonistic functions to kinases, which add a phosphate to a protein. SHIP1 and SHIP2 are types of lipid phosphatases associated with FEME.

- SHIP1
- SHIP2

== FEME and disease ==
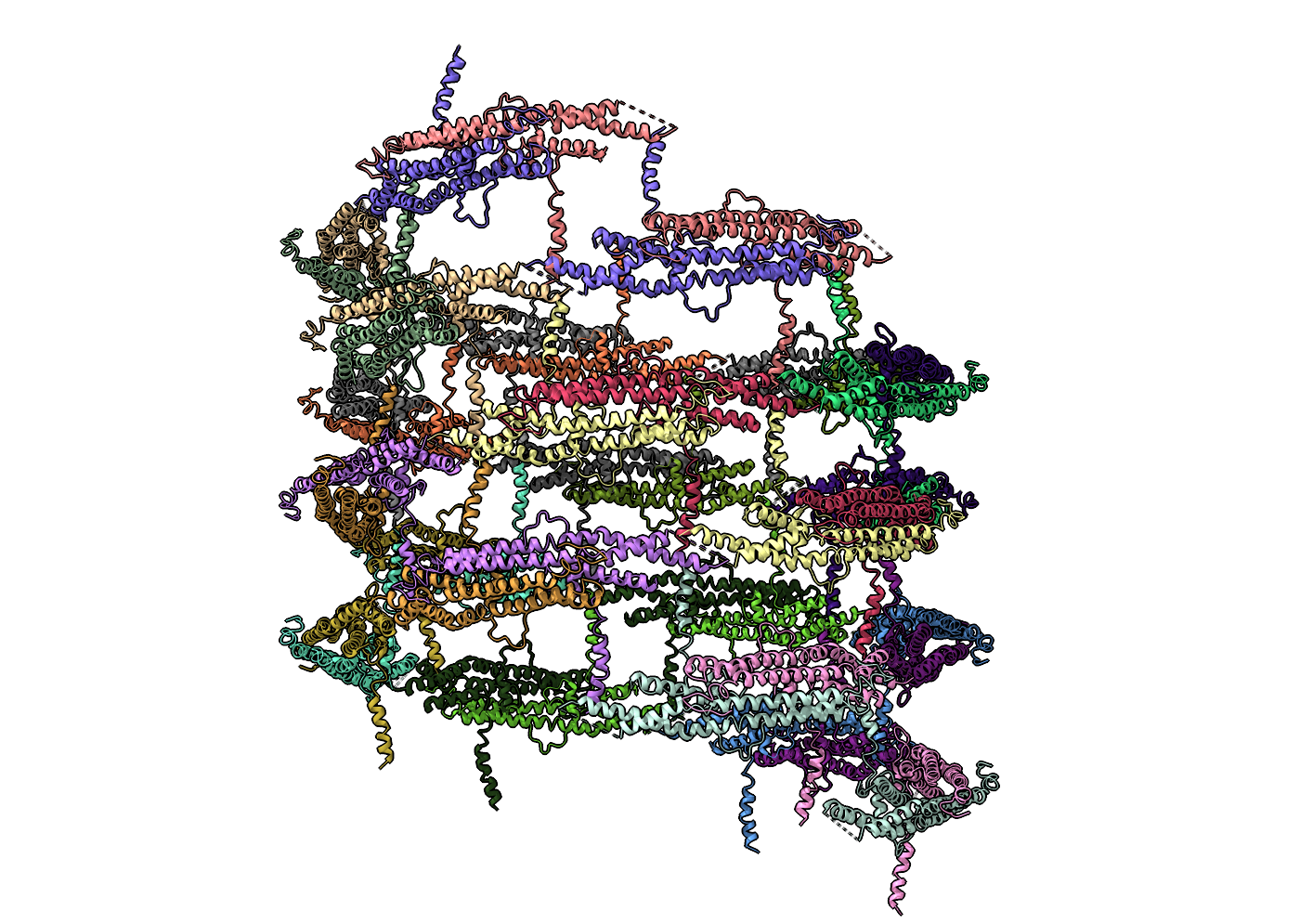
A pseudo-atomic model of helical scaffolds formed by a truncated version of endophilin-B1.

Endophilin plays a crucial role in the regulation of various diseases. The inhibition of FEME has been indicated as potential treatment method for many types of cancers and other diseases. In their article titled "Biology of Endophilin and it's role in disease" published in the Frontiers in Immunology journal in 2023, Lu-Qi Yang, An-Fang Huang, and Wang-Dong Xu highlight four major categories of diseases regulated by endophilins: Neurodegenerative diseases, cardiovascular diseases, autoimmune diseases, and tumors.

There are many subtypes of Endophilin that are expressed in different organs. Endophilin A is essential for FEME and an important regulatory protein in eukaryotic cells. Endophilin B can induce disease by changing cell behavior via autophagy induction or by causing cell self-destruction, also known as apoptosis.

Subtype of Endophilin	Organ(s) the Subtype is Expressed in
Endophilin A1	Brain Tissue
Endophilin A2	Pancreas, Placenta, Prostate, Testicles, Uterus, etc.
Endophilin A3	Brain & Testicular Tissues
Endophilin B1	Heart, Skeletal Muscle, Kidney, & Placenta
Endophilin B2	Skeletal Muscle, Adipose Tissue, Lungs, Brain, & Mammary Glands

=== Neurodegenerative diseases ===
Alzheimer's and Parkinson's disease are both heavily regulated by the activation or silencing of Endophilin.

=== Tumors ===
Activation of SHIP1 and SHIP2, proteins associated with FEME, has been shown to fight cancer by suppressing tumors.
