= Darovasertib =

Chemical compound

Clinical data
- Other names: IDE196, LXS196

Identifiers
- IUPAC name: 3-amino-N-[3-(4-amino-4-methylpiperidin-1-yl)pyridin-2-yl]-6-[3-(trifluoromethyl)pyridin-2-yl]pyrazine-2-carboxamide
- CAS Number: 1874276-76-2
- PubChem CID: 118873253
- IUPHAR/BPS: 11186
- DrugBank: DB16059
- ChemSpider: 57617794
- UNII: E0YF0M8O09
- KEGG: D12139
- ChEMBL: ChEMBL3982723

Chemical and physical data
- Formula: C_{22}H_{23}F_{3}N_{8}O
- Molar mass: 472.476 g·mol^{−1}
- 3D model (JSmol): Interactive image
- SMILES: CC1(CCN(CC1)C2=C(N=CC=C2)NC(=O)C3=NC(=CN=C3N)C4=C(C=CC=N4)C(F)(F)F)N
- InChI: InChI=InChI=1S/C22H23F3N8O/c1-21(27)6-10-33(11-7-21)15-5-3-9-29-19(15)32-20(34)17-18(26)30-12-14(31-17)16-13(22(23,24)25)4-2-8-28-16/h2-5,8-9,12H,6-7,10-11,27H2,1H3,(H2,26,30)(H,29,32,34); Key:XXJXHXJWQSCNPX-UHFFFAOYSA-N

Darovasertib is an investigational new drug that is being evaluated for the treatment of metastatic uveal melanoma and other cancers. It is a first-in-class oral, small molecule inhibitor of protein kinase C (PKC).

It selectively targets PKC activation by constitutively active mutant forms GNAQ or GNA11, which are present in approximately 90% of uveal melanoma cases. The U.S. Food and Drug Administration (FDA) granted orphan drug designation to darovasertib for the treatment of uveal melanoma on May 2, 2022, highlighting its potential to address an unmet medical need in this rare and aggressive form of eye cancer. As of 2024, darovasertib is in clinical development, with ongoing phase 1/2 trials evaluating its efficacy both as a monotherapy and in combination with other agents, such as binimetinib and crizotinib.
