= Serine/threonine-protein kinase N3 =

Protein-coding gene in the species Homo sapiens

PKN3

Identifiers
- Aliases: PKN3, UTDP4-1, protein kinase N3
- External IDs: OMIM: 610714; MGI: 2388285; GeneCards: PKN3
Enzyme activity
EC #	BRENDA	ExPASy	KEGG	MetaCyc
2.7.11.13	↗	↗	↗	↗

Gene location (Human)
Chr.	Chromosome 9 (human)
Band	9q34.11	Start	128,702,503 bp
Band	9q34.11	End	128,720,916 bp

Gene location (Mouse)
Chr.	Chromosome 2 (mouse)
Band	2|2 B	Start	30,077,684 bp
Band	2|2 B	End	30,091,022 bp
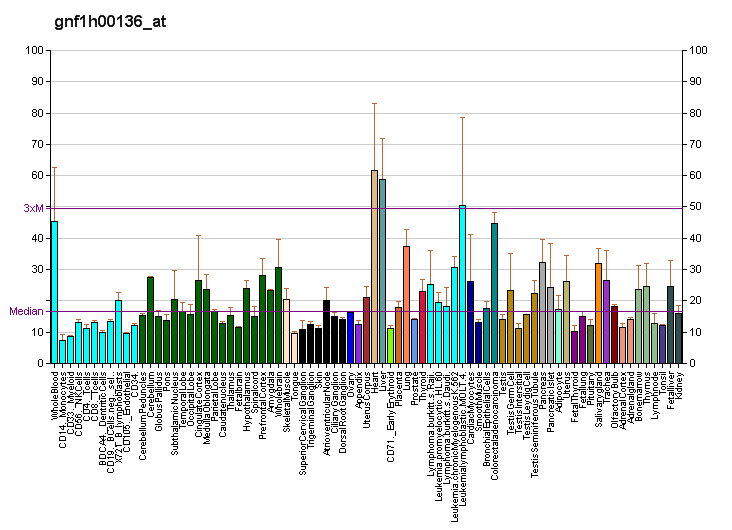

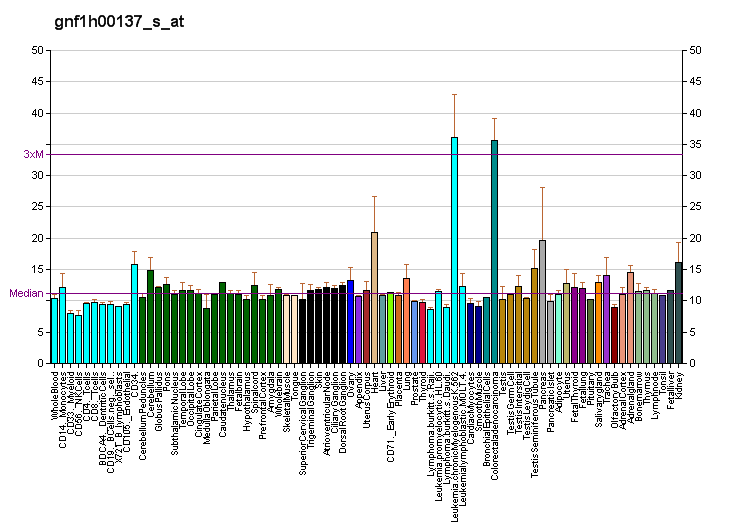
RNA expression pattern
Bgee	Human / Mouse (ortholog); Top expressed in: apex of heart; ventricular zone; right lung; upper lobe of left lung; subcutaneous adipose tissue; minor salivary glands; left ventricle; right hemisphere of cerebellum; testicle; left uterine tube / Top expressed in: otic vesicle; yolk sac; semi-lunar valve; endothelial cell of lymphatic vessel; aortic valve; condyle; esophagus; renal corpuscle; ascending aorta; fossa; More reference expression data
BioGPS	More reference expression data
Gene ontology
Molecular function	transferase activity; protein kinase activity; nucleotide binding; protein serine/threonine kinase activity; protein kinase C activity; protein binding; ATP binding; kinase activity
Cellular component	cytoplasm; perinuclear region of cytoplasm; Golgi apparatus; nucleus
Biological process	protein phosphorylation; intracellular signal transduction; peptidyl-serine phosphorylation; epithelial cell migration; phosphorylation; signal transduction
Sources:Amigo / QuickGO
Orthologs
Databases	NCBI: entry; OMA: entry
Species	Human	Mouse
Entrez	29941	263803
Ensembl	ENSG00000160447	ENSMUSG00000026785
UniProt	Q6P5Z2	Q8K045
RefSeq (mRNA)	NM_013355; NM_001317926	NM_153805
RefSeq (protein)	NP_001304855; NP_037487	NP_722500
Location (UCSC)	Chr 9: 128.7 – 128.72 Mb	Chr 2: 30.08 – 30.09 Mb
PubMed search
- Wikidata
View/Edit Human	View/Edit Mouse

Serine/threonine-protein kinase N3 is a protein kinase C-related molecule which in humans is encoded by the PKN3 gene. It is thought to be an effector mediating malignant cell growth downstream of activated phosphoinositide 3-kinase (PI3K). It is thought that chronic activation of the phosphoinositide 3-kinase (PI3K)/PTEN signal transduction pathway contributes to metastatic cell growth and that PKN3 may mediate that growth.

PKN3 is required for invasive prostate cell growth as assessed by 3D cell culture assays and in an orthotopic mouse tumor model by inducible expression of short hairpin RNA (shRNA). PKN3 may represent a target for therapeutic intervention in cancers that lack tumor suppressor PTEN function or depend on chronic activation of PI3K.

== Interactions ==
PKN3 has been shown to interact with ARHGAP26.
