= BIM-1 =

Biological protein kinase C inhibitor

Names
- IUPAC name 3-{1-[3-(Dimethylamino)propyl]-1H-indol-3-yl}-4-(1H-indol-3-yl)-1H-pyrrole-2,5-dione
- Other names RBT205 INHIBITOR, BI1

Identifiers
CAS Number	133052-90-1
3D model (JSmol)	Interactive image
ChemSpider	2303
DrugBank	DB03777
ECHA InfoCard	100.122.321
EC Number	603-702-0
IUPHAR/BPS	5193
MeSH	bisindolylmaleimide
PubChem CID	2396
UNII	L79H6N0V6C
CompTox Dashboard (EPA)	DTXSID50157932
- InChI: Key: QMGUOJYZJKLOLH-UHFFFAOYSA-N; InChI=1S/C25H24N4O2/c1-28(2)12-7-13-29-15-19(17-9-4-6-11-21(17)29)23-22(24(30)27-25(23)31)18-14-26-20-10-5-3-8-16(18)20/h3-6,8-11,14-15,26H,7,12-13H2,1-2H3,(H,27,30,31)
- SMILES: O=C5C(\c2c1ccccc1[nH]c2)=C(\c4c3ccccc3n(c4)CCCN(C)C)C(=O)N5

Properties
Chemical formula	C_{25}H_{24}N_{4}O_{2}
Molar mass	412.493 g·mol^{−1}
Appearance	Orange solid
Density	1.3 g/cm^{3}
Melting point	208 to 210 °C (406 to 410 °F; 481 to 483 K)
Solubility in DMSO	Soluble
- Except where otherwise noted, data are given for materials in their standard state (at 25 °C [77 °F], 100 kPa). Infobox references

BIM-1 (GF 109203X) and the related compounds BIM-2, BIM-3, and BIM-8 are bisindolylmaleimide-based protein kinase C (PKC) inhibitors. These inhibitors also inhibit PDK1 explaining the higher inhibitory potential of LY33331 compared to the other BIM compounds a bisindolylmaleimide inhibitor toward PDK1.

== Function ==
BIM-1 is present in the structure of PKCiota (residue 574-turn motif). It needs to be phosphorylated towards a PKCbeta-specific inhibitor site-directed mutagenesis of the compound for its full activation and co-crystallized as an asymmetric pair which is mediated by 3-phosphoinositide-dependent protein kinase-1 (PDK1) are downstream characteristics of PKCs and PKB/AKT.

== Scope ==
The bound BIM-1 inhibitor blocks bilobal interactions, the ATP-binding site, features an ATP-competitive inhibitor, 2-methyl-1H-indol-3-yl-BIM-1, the crystal structure and catalytic subunit with a 20-amino acid substrate analog inhibitor structure is bilobal MgATP a transport protein that provide a more precise description of which is influenced by lobe-lobe interactions binding in cells expressing both forms a pair of kinase-inhibitor complexes with ferritin in a soluble and non-toxic form (Poisson-Boltzmann) and a portion of the inhibitor peptide a lysine residue, has been shown to be involved in ATP binding.

== Interactions ==
The PKCiota-BIM-1 complex interacts with the zinc finger of lambda/iota PKC characterization of lambda-interacting protein (LIP) (lambda-interacting protein; a selective activator of lambda/iota PKC). Phosphorylation of a PKC induces a conformation leading to import of a PKC into the nucleus. The entire 587-amino acid coding region of a new PKC isoform, PKC iota. Where Thr-412 (activation loop of the kinase domain) at PKCiota/lambda phosphorylates glyceraldehyde-3-phosphate dehydrogenase (GAPDH) that sort cargo to the anterograde pathway the phosphorylation pathway(s) involved in this phenomenon mimic glutamate and can adopt two limiting diastereomeric (syn and anti) conformation biosynthetically related indolocarbazole analogs and in Proto-oncogene serine/threonine-protein kinase Pim-1-Peptide as a phosphorylation target including itself. The bound BIM-1 inhibitor blocks the ATP-binding site and puts the kinase domain into an intermediate open conformation. The value of such calculations lies in understanding a variant was designed which showed improved binding characteristics of configurationally stable atropisomeric bisindolylmaleimides where the two kinase domains, and two different inhibitor conformers bind in different orientations, the hinge region of staurosporine-Pim-1 resembles co-crystallized as an asymmetric pair of biosynthetically 'related' indolocarbazole analogs. It is a modulator of the 5-HT_{2A} receptor.
