= Ruboxistaurin =

Chemical compound

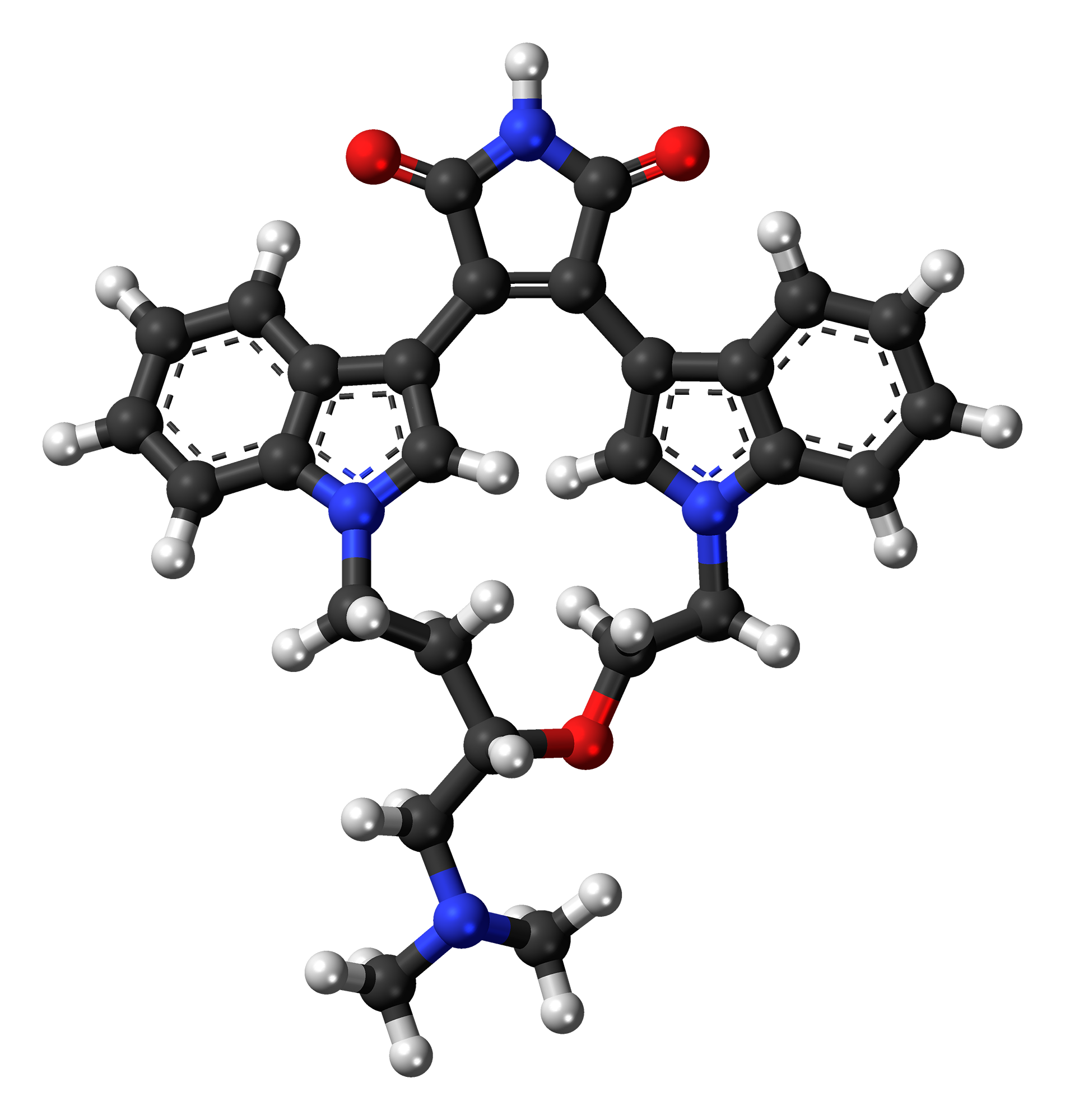

Clinical data
- ATC code: none

Legal status
- Legal status: US: Not FDA approved

Identifiers
- IUPAC name: (9S)-9-[(Dimethylamino)methyl]-6,7,10,11-tetrahydro-9H,18H-5,21:12,17-di(metheno)dibenzo[e,k]pyrrolo[3,4-h][1,4,13]oxadiazacyclohexadecine-18,20-dione
- CAS Number: 169939-94-0
- PubChem CID: 153999
- IUPHAR/BPS: 5263
- ChemSpider: 135727
- UNII: 721809WQCP
- ChEMBL: ChEMBL91829
- CompTox Dashboard (EPA): DTXSID00168775

Chemical and physical data
- Formula: C_{28}H_{28}N_{4}O_{3}
- Molar mass: 468.557 g·mol^{−1}
- 3D model (JSmol): Interactive image
- SMILES: CN(C[C@]1([H])CCN2C=C(C(C(O)=NC3=O)=C3C(C4=CC=CC=C45)=CN5CCO1)C6=CC=CC=C62)C
- InChI: InChI=1S/C28H28N4O3/c1-30(2)15-18-11-12-31-16-21(19-7-3-5-9-23(19)31)25-26(28(34)29-27(25)33)22-17-32(13-14-35-18)24-10-6-4-8-20(22)24/h3-10,16-18H,11-15H2,1-2H3,(H,29,33,34)/t18-/m0/s1; Key:ZCBUQCWBWNUWSU-SFHVURJKSA-N

Ruboxistaurin (proposed brand name Arxxant) is an investigational drug for diabetic retinopathy being investigated by Eli Lilly and Company. It is a member of the bisindolylmaleimide family.

In February 2006, Lilly submitted a New Drug Application for ruboxistaurin, and on August 18, 2006, Lilly received an approvable letter from the US FDA for ruboxistaurin, with a request for an additional clinical trial, which would take 5 years to complete. Lilly has not made any further request for approval and ruboxistaurin is not approved by the FDA for any medical use.

== Mechanism of action ==
Ruboxistaurin is an inhibitor of protein kinase C-beta.
