= Protein kinase C =

Family of enzymes

Identifiers
- EC no.: 2.7.11.13
- CAS no.: 141436-78-4

Databases
- BRENDA: enzyme data
- ExPASy: NiceZyme view
- KEGG: enzyme entry
- MetaCyc: metabolic pathway
- Rhea: reactions
- PDB structures: RCSB PDB PDBe PDBsum
- Gene Ontology: AmiGO / QuickGO
Search
- PMC: articles
- PubMed: articles
- NCBI: proteins

Protein kinase C terminal domain

Identifiers
- Symbol: Pkinase_C
- Pfam: PF00433
- InterPro: IPR017892
Available protein structures:
- PDB: IPR017892 PF00433 (ECOD; PDBsum)
- AlphaFold: IPR017892; PF00433

In cell biology, protein kinase C, commonly abbreviated to PKC (EC 2.7.11.13), is a family of protein kinase enzymes that are involved in controlling the function of other proteins through the phosphorylation of hydroxyl groups of serine and threonine amino acid residues on these proteins, or a member of this family. PKC enzymes in turn are activated by signals such as increases in the concentration of diacylglycerol (DAG) or calcium ions (Ca^{2+}). Hence PKC enzymes play important roles in several signal transduction cascades.

In biochemistry, the PKC family consists of fifteen isozymes in humans. They are divided into three subfamilies, based on their second messenger requirements: conventional (or classical), novel, and atypical. Conventional (c)PKCs contain the isoforms α, β_{I}, β_{II}, and γ. These require Ca^{2+}, DAG, and a phospholipid such as phosphatidylserine for activation. Novel (n)PKCs include the δ, ε, η, and θ isoforms, and require DAG, but do not require Ca^{2+} for activation. Thus, conventional and novel PKCs are activated through the same signal transduction pathway as phospholipase C. On the other hand, atypical (a)PKCs (including protein kinase Mζ and ι / λ isoforms) require neither Ca^{2+} nor diacylglycerol for activation. The term "protein kinase C" usually refers to the entire family of isoforms. The different classes of PKCs found in jawed vertebrates originate from 5 ancestral PKC family members (PKN, aPKC, cPKC, nPKCE, nPKCD) that expanded due to genome duplication. The broader PKC family is ancient and can be found back in fungi, which means that the PKC family was present in the last common ancestor of opisthokonts.

== Human isozymes ==
- conventional - require DAG, Ca^{2+}, and phospholipid for activation
  - PKC-α (PRKCA)
  - PKC-β1 (PRKCB)
  - PKC-β2 (PRKCB)
  - PKC-γ (PRKCG)
- novel - require DAG but not Ca^{2+} for activation
  - PKC-δ (PRKCD)
  - PKC-ε (PRKCE)
  - PKC-η (PRKCH)
  - PKC-θ (PRKCQ)
- atypical - require neither Ca^{2+} nor DAG for activation (require phosphatidyl serine)
  - PKC-ι (PRKCI)
  - PKC-ζ (PRKCZ)
- related PKD
  - PKD1 (PRKD1)
  - PKD2 (PRKD2)
  - PKD3 (PRKD3)
- related PKN
  - PK-N1 (PKN1)
  - PK-N2 (PKN2)
  - PK-N3 (PKN3)

== Structure ==
The structure of all PKCs consists of a regulatory domain and a catalytic domain (active site) tethered together by a hinge region. The catalytic region is highly conserved among the different isoforms, as well as, to a lesser degree, among the catalytic region of other serine/threonine kinases. The second messenger requirement differences in the isoforms are a result of the regulatory region, which are similar within the classes, but differ among them. Most of the crystal structure of the catalytic region of PKC has not been determined, except for PKC theta and iota. Due to its similarity to other kinases whose crystal structure have been determined, the structure can be strongly predicted.

=== Regulatory ===
The regulatory domain or the amino-terminus of the PKCs contains several shared subregions. The C1 domain, present in all of the isoforms of PKC has a binding site for DAG as well as non-hydrolysable, non-physiological analogues called phorbol esters. This domain is functional and capable of binding DAG in both conventional and novel isoforms, however, the C1 domain in atypical PKCs is incapable of binding to DAG or phorbol esters. The C2 domain acts as a Ca^{2+} sensor and is present in both conventional and novel isoforms, but functional as a Ca^{2+} sensor only in the conventional. The pseudosubstrate region, which is present in all three classes of PKC, is a small sequence of amino acids that mimic a substrate and bind the substrate-binding cavity in the catalytic domain, lack critical serine, threonine phosphoacceptor residues, keeping the enzyme inactive. When Ca^{2+} and DAG are present in sufficient concentrations, they bind to the C2 and C1 domain, respectively, and recruit PKC to the membrane. This interaction with the membrane results in release of the pseudosubstrate from the catalytic site and activation of the enzyme. In order for these allosteric interactions to occur, however, PKC must first be properly folded and in the correct conformation permissive for catalytic action. This is contingent upon phosphorylation of the catalytic region, discussed below.

=== Catalytic ===
The catalytic region or kinase core of the PKC allows for different functions to be processed; PKB (also known as Akt) and PKC kinases contain approximately 40% amino acid sequence similarity. This similarity increases to ~ 70% across PKCs and even higher when comparing within classes. For example, the two atypical PKC isoforms, ζ and ι/λ, are 84% identical in their catalytic domains. Of the over-30 protein kinase structures whose crystal structure has been revealed, all have the same basic organization. They are a bilobal structure with a β sheet comprising the N-terminal lobe and an α helix constituting the C-terminal lobe. Both the ATP-binding protein (ATP)- and the substrate-binding sites are located in the cleft formed by these two terminal lobes. This is also where the pseudosubstrate domain of the regulatory region binds.

Another feature of the PKC catalytic region that is essential to the viability of the kinase is its phosphorylation. The conventional and novel PKCs have three phosphorylation sites, termed: the activation loop, the turn motif, and the hydrophobic motif. The atypical PKCs are phosphorylated only on the activation loop and the turn motif. Phosphorylation of the hydrophobic motif is rendered unnecessary by the presence of a glutamic acid in place of a serine, which, as a negative charge, acts similar in manner to a phosphorylated residue. These phosphorylation events are essential for the activity of the enzyme, and 3-phosphoinositide-dependent protein kinase-1 (PDPK1) is the upstream kinase responsible for initiating the process by transphosphorylation of the activation loop.

The consensus sequence of protein kinase C enzymes is similar to that of protein kinase A, since it contains basic amino acids close to the Ser/Thr to be phosphorylated. Their substrates are, e.g., MARCKS proteins, MAP kinase, transcription factor inhibitor IκB, the vitamin D_{3} receptor VDR, Raf kinase, calpain, and the epidermal growth factor receptor.

== Activation ==
Upon activation, protein kinase C enzymes are translocated to the plasma membrane by RACK proteins (membrane-bound receptor for activated protein kinase C proteins). This localization also gives the enzyme access to substrate, an activation mechanism termed substrate presentation. The protein kinase C enzymes are known for their long-term activation: They remain activated after the original activation signal or the Ca^{2+}-wave is gone. It is presumed that this is achieved by the production of diacylglycerol from phosphatidylinositol by a phospholipase; fatty acids may also play a role in long-term activation. A critical part of PKC activation is translocation to the cell membrane. Interestingly, this process is disrupted in microgravity, which causes immunodeficiency of astronauts.

== Function ==
A multiplicity of functions have been ascribed to PKC. Recurring themes are that PKC is involved in receptor desensitization, in modulating membrane structure events, in regulating transcription, in mediating immune responses, in regulating cell growth, and in learning and memory. PKC isoforms have been designated "memory kinases," and deficits in PKC signaling in neurons is an early abnormality in the brains of patients with Alzheimer's disease. These functions are achieved by PKC-mediated phosphorylation of other proteins. PKC plays an important role in the immune system through phosphorylation of CARD-CC family proteins and subsequent NF-κB activation. However, the substrate proteins present for phosphorylation vary, since protein expression is different between different kinds of cells. Thus, effects of PKC are cell-type-specific:

Cell type	Organ/system	Activators ligands → G_{q}-GPCRs	Effects
smooth muscle cell (gastrointestinal tract sphincters)	digestive system	prostaglandin F_{2α} →; thromboxanes	contraction
smooth muscle cells in: iris dilator muscle (sensory system); urethral sphincter (urinary system); uterus (reproductive system); arrector pili muscles (integumentary system); ureter (urinary system); urinary bladder (urinary system)	Various	adrenergic agonists → α1 receptor	contraction
smooth muscle cells in: iris constrictor muscle; ciliary muscle	sensory system	acetylcholine → M3 receptor	contraction
smooth muscle cell (vascular)	circulatory system	5-HT → 5-HT2A receptor; adrenergic agonists → α1 receptor	vasoconstriction
smooth muscle cell (seminal tract)	reproductive system	adrenergic agonists → α1 receptor	ejaculation
smooth muscle cell (GI tract)	digestive system	5-HT → 5-HT2A or 5-HT2B receptor; acetylcholine (ACh) → M3 receptor	contraction
smooth muscle cell (bronchi)	respiratory system	5-HT → 5-HT2A receptor; adrenergic agonists → β₂ receptor; acetylcholine → M3 and M1 receptor	bronchoconstriction
proximal convoluted tubule cell	kidney	angiotensin II → AT1 receptor; adrenergic agonists → α1 receptor	stimulate NHE3 → H^{+} secretion & Na^{+} reabsorption; stimulate basolateral Na-K ATPase → Na^{+} reabsorption
neurons in autonomic ganglia	nervous system	acetylcholine → M1 receptor	EPSP
neurons in CNS	nervous system	5-HT → 5-HT2A receptor; glutamate → NMDA receptor	neuronal excitation (5-HT); memory (glutamate)
platelets	circulatory system	5-HT → 5-HT2A receptor	aggregation
ependymal cells (choroid plexus)	ventricular system	5-HT → 5-HT2C receptor	↑ cerebrospinal fluid secretion
heart muscle	circulatory system	adrenergic agonists → β1 receptor	positive ionotropic effect
serous cells (salivary gland)	digestive system	acetylcholine → M1 and M3 receptors; adrenergic agonists → β1 receptor	↑ secretion; ↑ salivary potassium levels.
serous cells (lacrimal gland)	digestive system	acetylcholine → M3 receptor	↑ secretion
adipocyte	digestive system/endocrine system	adrenergic agonists → β_{3} receptor	glycogenolysis and gluconeogenesis
hepatocyte	digestive system	adrenergic agonists → α1 receptor	
sweat gland cells	integumentary system	adrenergic agonists → β2 receptor	↑ secretion
parietal cells	digestive system	acetylcholine → M3 receptors	↑ gastric acid secretion
lymphocyte	immune system	T-cell receptor; B-cell receptor; Killer-cell immunoglobulin-like receptor	CARD11/BCL10/MALT1 complex → NF-κB; adaptive immune system
myelocyte	immune system	C-type lectin receptors (CLR) (Dectin 1, Mincle)	CARD9/BCL10/MALT1 complex → NF-κB; innate immune system

== Pathology ==
Protein kinase C, activated by tumor promoter phorbol ester, may phosphorylate potent activators of transcription, and thus lead to increased expression of oncogenes, promoting cancer progression, or interfere with other phenomena. Prolonged exposure to phorbol ester, however, promotes the down-regulation of Protein kinase C. Loss-of-function mutations and low PKC protein levels are prevalent in cancer, supporting a general tumor-suppressive role for Protein kinase C.

Protein kinase C enzymes are important mediators of vascular permeability and have been implicated in various vascular diseases including disorders associated with hyperglycemia in diabetes mellitus, as well as endothelial injury and tissue damage related to cigarette smoke. Low-level PKC activation is sufficient to reverse cell chirality through phosphatidylinositol 3-kinase/AKT signaling and alters junctional protein organization between cells with opposite chirality, leading to an unexpected substantial change in endothelial permeability, which often leads to inflammation and disease.

== Inhibitors ==
Protein kinase C inhibitors, such as ruboxistaurin, may potentially be beneficial in peripheral diabetic nephropathy.

Chelerythrine is a natural selective PKC inhibitor. Other naturally occurring PKCIs are miyabenol C, myricitrin, gossypol.

Bryostatin 1 can act as a PKC inhibitor; It was investigated for cancer.

Darovasertib is an investigational new drug in efficacy trials in treatment of metastatic uveal melanoma.

Other PKCIs include Verbascoside, BIM-1, Ro31-8220, and Tamoxifen.

== Activators ==
The Protein kinase C activator ingenol mebutate, derived from the plant Euphorbia peplus, is FDA-approved for the treatment of actinic keratosis.

Bryostatin 1 can act as a PKCe activator and as of 2016 is being investigated for Alzheimer's disease.

12-O-Tetradecanoylphorbol-13-acetate (PMA or TPA) is a diacylglycerol mimic that can activate the classical PKCs. It is often used together with ionomycin which provides the calcium-dependent signals needed for activation of some PKCs.

== See also ==
- Serine/threonine-specific protein kinase
- Signal transduction
- Yasutomi Nishizuka, discovered protein kinase C
- CCDC60
