= ARHGAP26 =

Protein-coding gene in the species Homo sapiens

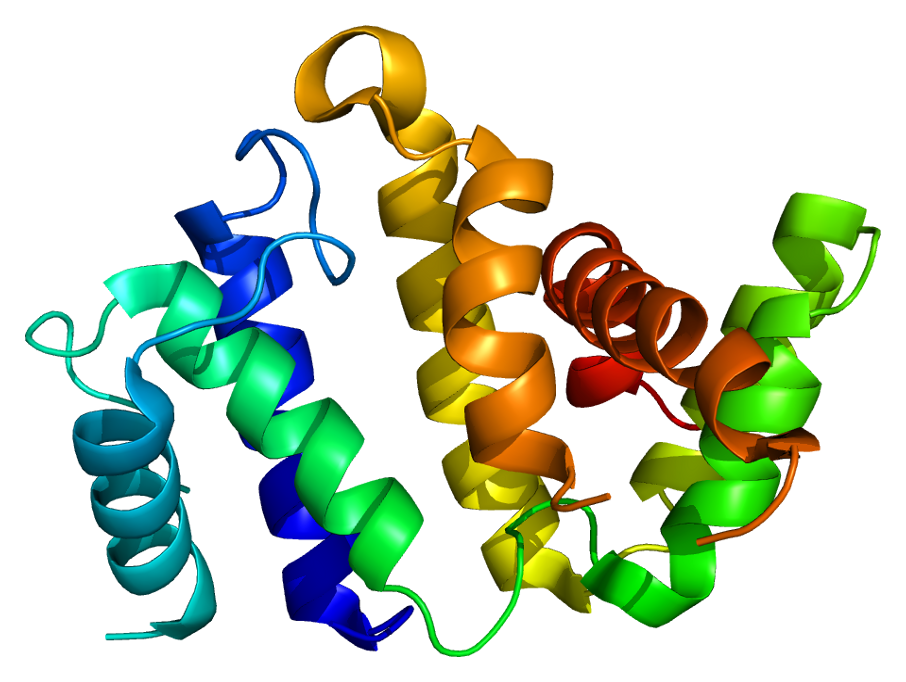

Identifiers
- Aliases: ARHGAP26, GRAF, GRAF1, OPHN1L, OPHN1L1, Rho GTPase activating protein 26
- External IDs: OMIM: 605370; MGI: 1918552; GeneCards: ARHGAP26
Available structures
PDB	Ortholog search: PDBe RCSB
PDB	List of PDB id codes 1UGV

Gene location (Human)
Chr.	Chromosome 5 (human)
Band	5q31.3	Start	142,770,377 bp
Band	5q31.3	End	143,229,011 bp

Gene location (Mouse)
Chr.	Chromosome 18 (mouse)
Band	18|18 B3	Start	39,126,198 bp
Band	18|18 B3	End	39,509,337 bp
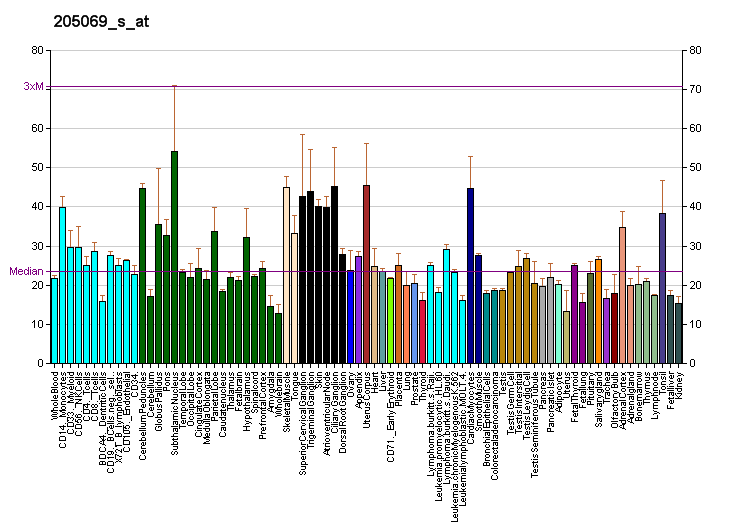

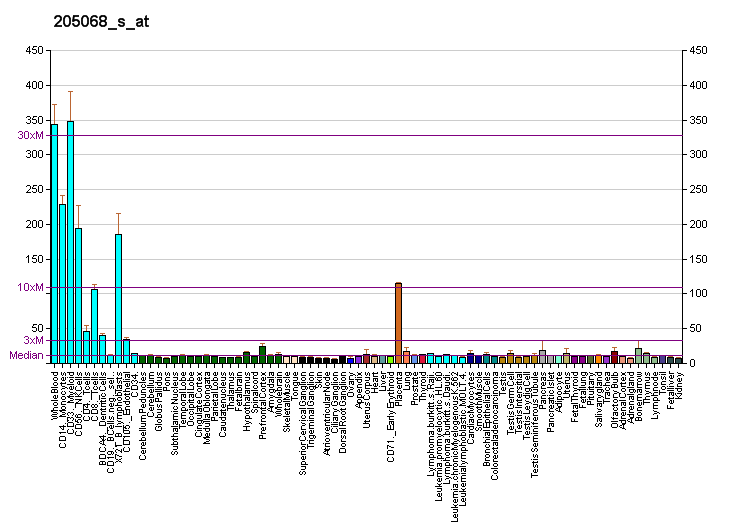

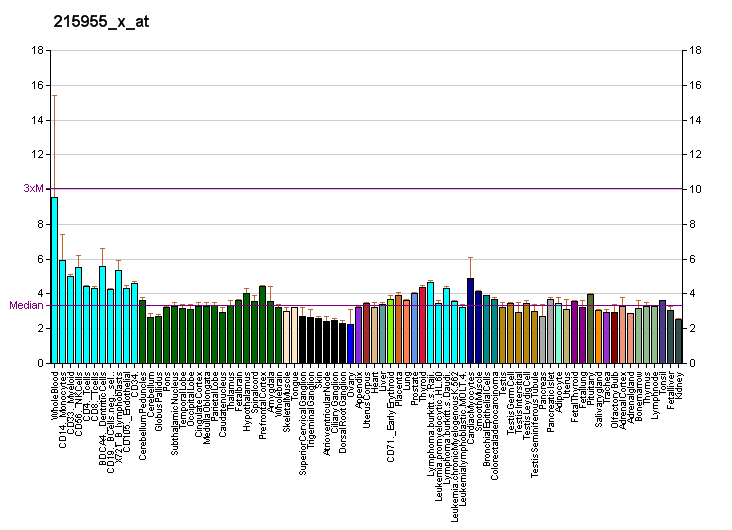
RNA expression pattern
Bgee	Human / Mouse (ortholog); Top expressed in: sural nerve; blood; epithelium of colon; monocyte; right uterine tube; testicle; granulocyte; bone marrow cell; Achilles tendon; postcentral gyrus / Top expressed in: interventricular septum; lobe of cerebellum; cerebellar vermis; zygote; otolith organ; utricle; prefrontal cortex; subiculum; anterior amygdaloid area; visual cortex; More reference expression data
BioGPS	More reference expression data
Gene ontology
Molecular function	protein binding; phospholipid binding; GTPase activator activity
Cellular component	cytoplasm; cytosol; cell junction; cytoskeleton; focal adhesion; cellular component
Biological process	regulation of small GTPase mediated signal transduction; actin cytoskeleton organization; nervous system development; signal transduction; positive regulation of GTPase activity
Sources:Amigo / QuickGO
Orthologs
Databases	NCBI: entry; OMA: entry
Species	Human	Mouse
Entrez	23092	71302
Ensembl	ENSG00000145819	ENSMUSG00000036452
UniProt	Q9UNA1	Q6ZQ82
RefSeq (mRNA)	NM_001135608; NM_015071; NM_001349547	NM_175164; NM_001361073; NM_001374831
RefSeq (protein)	NP_001129080; NP_055886; NP_001336476	NP_780373; NP_001348002; NP_001361760
Location (UCSC)	Chr 5: 142.77 – 143.23 Mb	Chr 18: 39.13 – 39.51 Mb
PubMed search
- Wikidata
View/Edit Human	View/Edit Mouse

Rho GTPase activating protein 26 (ARHGAP26) also known as GTPase Regulator Associated with Focal Adhesion Kinase (GRAF) is a protein that in humans is encoded by the ARHGAP26 gene.

== Function ==
GRAF1 is a multidomain protein that is necessary for the CLIC/GEEC endocytic pathway. By virtue of an N-terminal BAR domain, GRAF1 sculpts the endocytic membranes of this pathway into 40 nm diameter tubules and vesicles that allow uptake of extracellular fluid, GPI-linked proteins and certain bacterial exotoxins into cells. The role of dynamin in the CLIC/GEEC pathway is controversial, but GRAF1 interacts strongly with this protein and acute inhibition of dynamin action abrogates CLIC/GEEC endocytosis. There are several members of the GRAF family of proteins, including GRAF2, GRAF3, and oligophrenin, all of which likely playing similar roles during clathrin-independent endocytic events. Mutations of both GRAF1 and oligophrenin are strongly implicated in causing human disease (leukaemia and mental retardation, respectively). Recently, autoantibodies to ARHGAP26 have been implicated in autoimmune cerebellar ataxia.

== Interactions ==
ARHGAP26 has been shown to interact with PKN3.
