= ZNF593 =

Protein-coding gene in humans

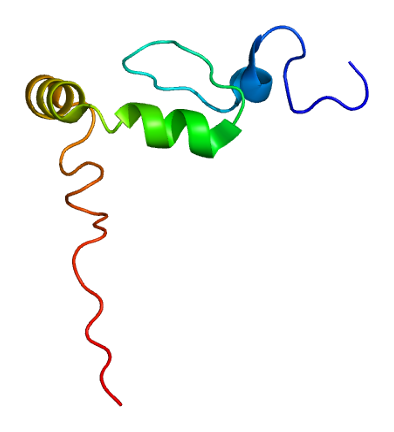

Identifiers
- Aliases: ZNF593, ZT86, zinc finger protein 593
- External IDs: OMIM: 616698; MGI: 1915290; GeneCards: ZNF593
Available structures
PDB	Ortholog search: PDBe RCSB
PDB	List of PDB id codes 1ZR9

Gene location (Human)
Chr.	Chromosome 1 (human)
Band	1p36.11	Start	26,169,908 bp
Band	1p36.11	End	26,170,873 bp

Gene location (Mouse)
Chr.	Chromosome 4 (mouse)
Band	4|4 D2.3	Start	133,970,600 bp
Band	4|4 D2.3	End	133,972,903 bp
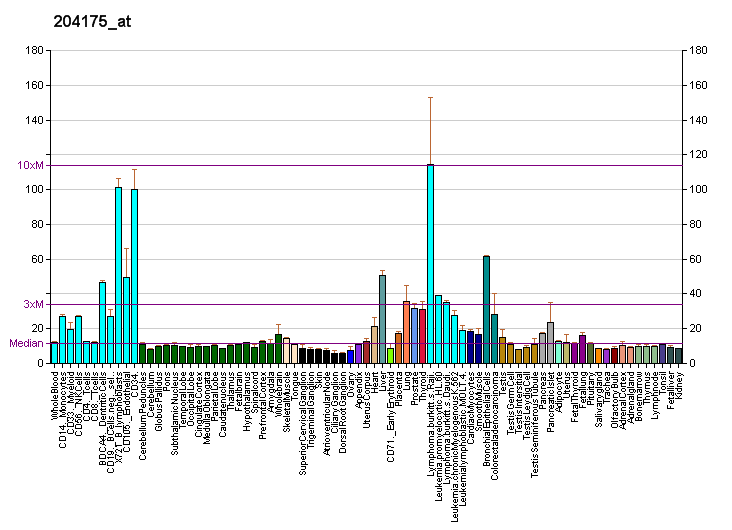
RNA expression pattern
Bgee	Human / Mouse (ortholog); Top expressed in: gastrocnemius muscle; muscle of thigh; body of pancreas; right lobe of liver; mucosa of transverse colon; body of stomach; glutes; apex of heart; gonad; Skeletal muscle tissue of rectus abdominis / Top expressed in: Paneth cell; endothelial cell of lymphatic vessel; lumbar spinal ganglion; hair follicle; epithelium of lens; primitive streak; condyle; seminal vesicula; mesenteric lymph nodes; fossa; More reference expression data
BioGPS	More reference expression data
Gene ontology
Molecular function	DNA binding; protein binding; metal ion binding; nucleic acid binding; acyl binding; acyl carrier activity; phosphopantetheine binding; ribosomal large subunit binding; zinc ion binding; DNA-binding transcription factor activity, RNA polymerase II-specific
Cellular component	nucleolus; nucleus; cytosol; preribosome, large subunit precursor
Biological process	regulation of transcription, DNA-templated; transcription, DNA-templated; ribosomal large subunit export from nucleus; lipid A biosynthetic process; positive regulation of transcription by RNA polymerase II; negative regulation of RNA polymerase II regulatory region sequence-specific DNA binding; fatty acid biosynthetic process
Sources:Amigo / QuickGO
Orthologs
Databases	NCBI: entry; OMA: entry
Species	Human	Mouse
Entrez	51042	68040
Ensembl	ENSG00000142684	ENSMUSG00000028840
UniProt	O00488	Q9DB42
RefSeq (mRNA)	NM_015871	NM_024215
RefSeq (protein)	NP_056955	NP_077177
Location (UCSC)	Chr 1: 26.17 – 26.17 Mb	Chr 4: 133.97 – 133.97 Mb
PubMed search
- Wikidata
View/Edit Human	View/Edit Mouse

Zinc finger protein 593 is a protein that in humans is encoded by the ZNF593 gene.
