= Potocytosis =

Potocytosis is a type of receptor-mediated endocytosis in which small molecules are transported across the plasma membrane of a cell. The molecules are transported by caveolae (rather than clathrin-coated vesicles) and are deposited directly into the cytosol.

Like other types of receptor-mediated endocytosis, potocytosis typically begins when an extracellular ligand binds to a receptor protein on the surface of a cell, thus beginning the formation of an endocytotic vesicle. The ligand is usually of low molecular mass (e.g. vitamins), but some larger molecules (such as lipids) can also act as ligands.

== Mechanism ==
Lipid rafts in the plasma membrane act as membrane microdomains. They are enriched in cholesterol and sphingolipids and are involved potocytosis as the lateral compartmentalization of molecules. Caveolae are caveolin-1-enriched smooth invaginations found on these lipid rafts that contribute to transportation of molecules. Potocytosis works by taking up material into caveolae at the surface of the cell. Glycosylphosphatidylinositol-anchored class of membrane proteins generate high concentrations of molecules. This may either be by releasing a receptor bound molecule, by converting molecules enzymatically or by releasing them from a carrier protein.
