= DCP1B =

Protein found in humans

Identifiers
- Aliases: DCP1B, DCP1, hDcp1b, decapping mRNA 1B
- External IDs: OMIM: 609843; MGI: 2442404; HomoloGene: 51881; GeneCards: DCP1B; OMA:DCP1B - orthologs

Gene location (Human)
Chr.	Chromosome 12 (human)
Band	12p13.33	Start	1,946,053 bp
Band	12p13.33	End	2,004,535 bp

Gene location (Mouse)
Chr.	Chromosome 6 (mouse)
Band	6|6 F1	Start	119,175,253 bp
Band	6|6 F1	End	119,221,616 bp
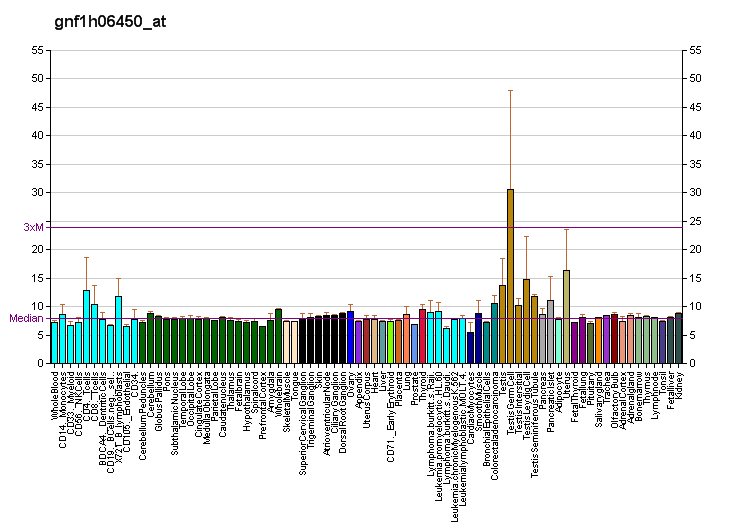
RNA expression pattern
Bgee	Human / Mouse (ortholog); Top expressed in: muscle layer of sigmoid colon; smooth muscle tissue; body of uterus; gonad; myometrium; right adrenal gland; right adrenal cortex; popliteal artery; tibial arteries; left adrenal gland / Top expressed in: seminiferous tubule; superior cervical ganglion; spermatocyte; spermatid; otolith organ; utricle; Rostral migratory stream; genital tubercle; spinal ganglia; tail of embryo; More reference expression data
BioGPS	More reference expression data
Gene ontology
Molecular function	enzyme regulator activity; enzyme activator activity; protein binding; mRNA binding; hydrolase activity
Cellular component	P-body; membrane; intracellular membrane-bounded organelle; nucleus; cytoplasm; cytosol
Biological process	nuclear-transcribed mRNA catabolic process, nonsense-mediated decay; positive regulation of catalytic activity; deadenylation-independent decapping of nuclear-transcribed mRNA; deadenylation-dependent decapping of nuclear-transcribed mRNA; exonucleolytic catabolism of deadenylated mRNA
Sources:Amigo / QuickGO
Orthologs
Species	Human	Mouse
Entrez	196513	319618
Ensembl	ENSG00000151065; ENSG00000284850	ENSMUSG00000041477
UniProt	Q8IZD4	B9EIX0
RefSeq (mRNA)	NM_152640; NM_001319292	NM_001033379
RefSeq (protein)	NP_001306221; NP_689853	NP_001028551
Location (UCSC)	Chr 12: 1.95 – 2 Mb	Chr 6: 119.18 – 119.22 Mb
PubMed search
- Wikidata
View/Edit Human	View/Edit Mouse

mRNA-decapping enzyme 1B is a protein that in humans is encoded by the DCP1B gene.

DCP1B is a core component of the mRNA decapping complex, a key factor in the regulation of mRNA decay (Lykke-Andersen, 2002).[supplied by OMIM]
