= Edwin Mansfield =

American economist (1930–1997)

- Born: June 8, 1930
- Died: November 17, 1997 (aged 67)
- Occupation: Professor of economics

Edwin Mansfield (June 8, 1930 – November 17, 1997) was a professor of economics at University of Pennsylvania from 1964 and until his death. From 1985 he was also a director of the Center for Economics and Technology.

Edwin Mansfield is best known for his scientific results concerning technological change / diffusion of innovations, and also for his textbooks on microeconomics, managerial economics, and econometrics that were published in millions copies and translated into foreign languages.
