= Bisindolylmaleimide =

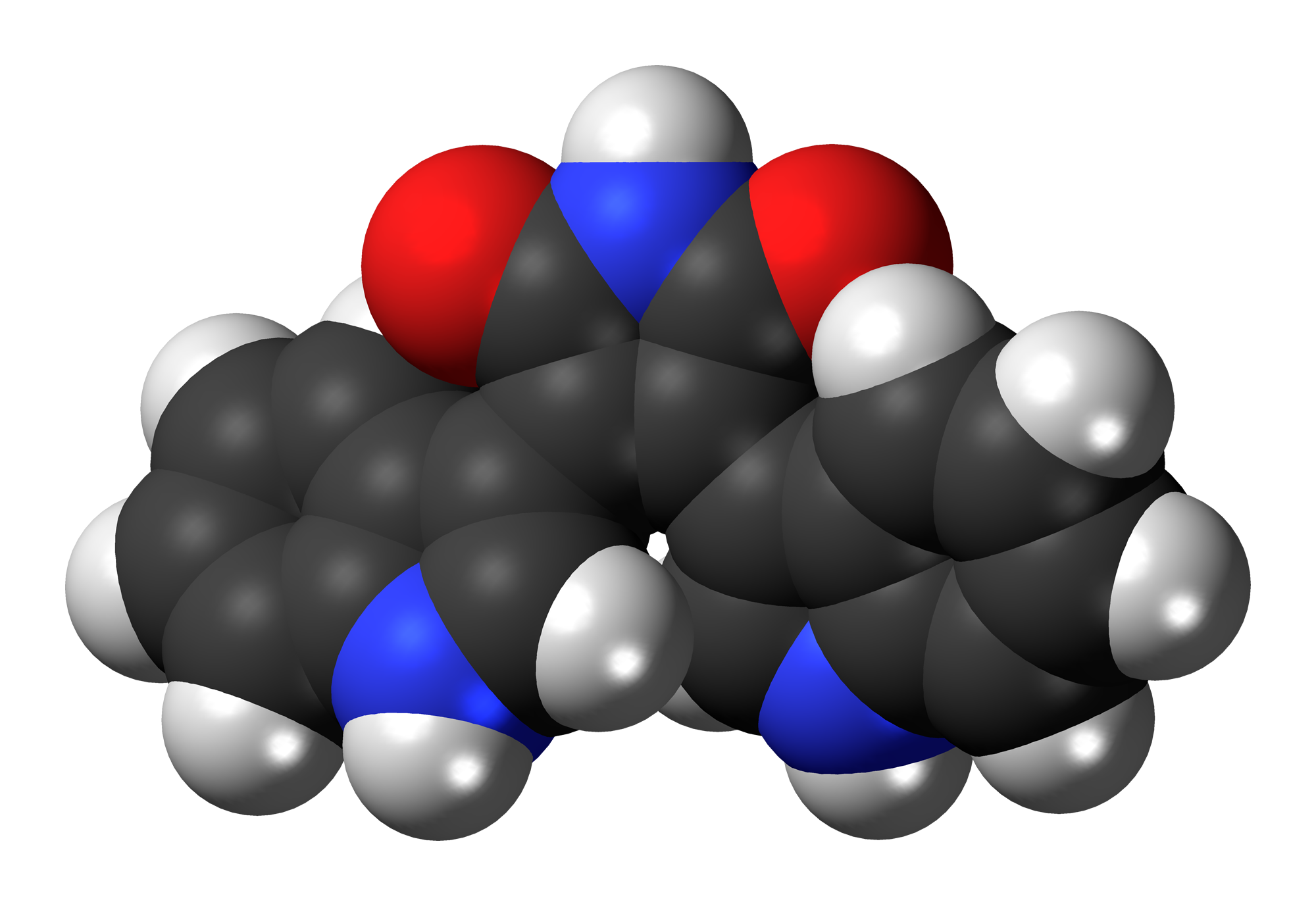

Names
- Preferred IUPAC name 3,4-Di(1H-indol-2-yl)-1H-pyrrole-2,5-dione

Identifiers
CAS Number	119139-23-0
3D model (JSmol)	Interactive image
ChemSpider	8862983
PubChem CID	10687637
UNII	MBK3OO5K8T
CompTox Dashboard (EPA)	DTXSID30152324
- InChI: InChI=1S/C20H13N3O2/c24-19-17(15-9-11-5-1-3-7-13(11)21-15)18(20(25)23-19)16-10-12-6-2-4-8-14(12)22-16/h1-10,21-22H,(H,23,24,25) Key: LRBHDUWDZCAYDA-UHFFFAOYSA-N; InChI=1/C20H13N3O2/c24-19-17(15-9-11-5-1-3-7-13(11)21-15)18(20(25)23-19)16-10-12-6-2-4-8-14(12)22-16/h1-10,21-22H,(H,23,24,25) Key: LRBHDUWDZCAYDA-UHFFFAOYAH
- SMILES: O=C5C(\c2cc1ccccc1[nH]2)=C(\c4cc3ccccc3[nH]4)C(=O)N5

Properties
Chemical formula	C_{20}H_{13}N_{3}O_{2}
Molar mass	327.343 g·mol^{−1}
- Except where otherwise noted, data are given for materials in their standard state (at 25 °C [77 °F], 100 kPa). Infobox references

Bisindolylmaleimide is an organic compound that forms the core chemical structure of a variety of biologically active compounds. This core structure includes a central maleimide group with two indole groups attached.

Examples of bisindolylmaleimide derivatives include:

- Bisindolylmaleimide I
- Enzastaurin
- Ruboxistaurin
- Tivantinib
