= Endocytosis =

Cellular process

The different types of endocytosis

Endocytosis is a cellular process in which substances are brought into the cell. The material to be internalized is surrounded by an area of cell membrane, which then buds off inside the cell to form a vesicle containing the ingested materials. Endocytosis includes pinocytosis (cell drinking) and phagocytosis (cell eating). It is a form of active transport.

== History ==
The term was proposed by De Duve in 1963. Phagocytosis was discovered by Élie Metchnikoff in 1882.

== Pathways ==
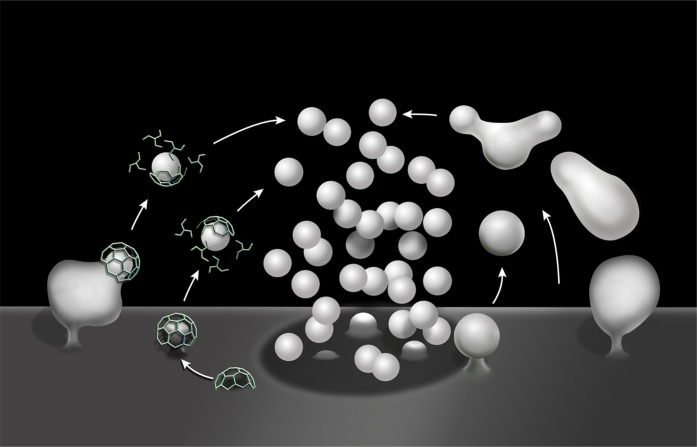
Schematic drawing illustrating clathrin-mediated (left) and clathrin-independent endocytosis (right) of synaptic vesicle membranes

Endocytosis pathways can be subdivided into four categories: namely, receptor-mediated endocytosis (also known as clathrin-mediated endocytosis), caveolae, pinocytosis, and phagocytosis.

- Clathrin-mediated endocytosis is mediated by the production of small (approx. 100 nm in diameter) vesicles that have a morphologically characteristic coat made up of the cytosolic protein clathrin. Clathrin-coated vesicles (CCVs) are found in virtually all cells and form domains of the plasma membrane termed clathrin-coated pits. Coated pits can concentrate large extracellular molecules that have different receptors responsible for the receptor-mediated endocytosis of ligands, e.g. low density lipoprotein, transferrin, growth factors, antibodies and many others.

Study in mammalian cells confirm a reduction in clathrin coat size in an increased tension environment. In addition, it suggests that the two apparently distinct clathrin assembly modes, namely coated pits and coated plaques, observed in experimental investigations might be a consequence of varied tensions in the plasma membrane.

- Caveolae are the most commonly reported non-clathrin-coated plasma membrane buds, which exist on the surface of many, but not all cell types. They consist of the cholesterol-binding protein caveolin (Vip21) with a bilayer enriched in cholesterol and glycolipids. Caveolae are small (approx. 50 nm in diameter) flask-shape pits in the membrane that resemble the shape of a cave (hence the name caveolae). They can constitute up to a third of the plasma membrane area of the cells of some tissues, being especially abundant in smooth muscle, type I pneumocytes, fibroblasts, adipocytes, and endothelial cells. Uptake of extracellular molecules is also believed to be specifically mediated via receptors in caveolae.
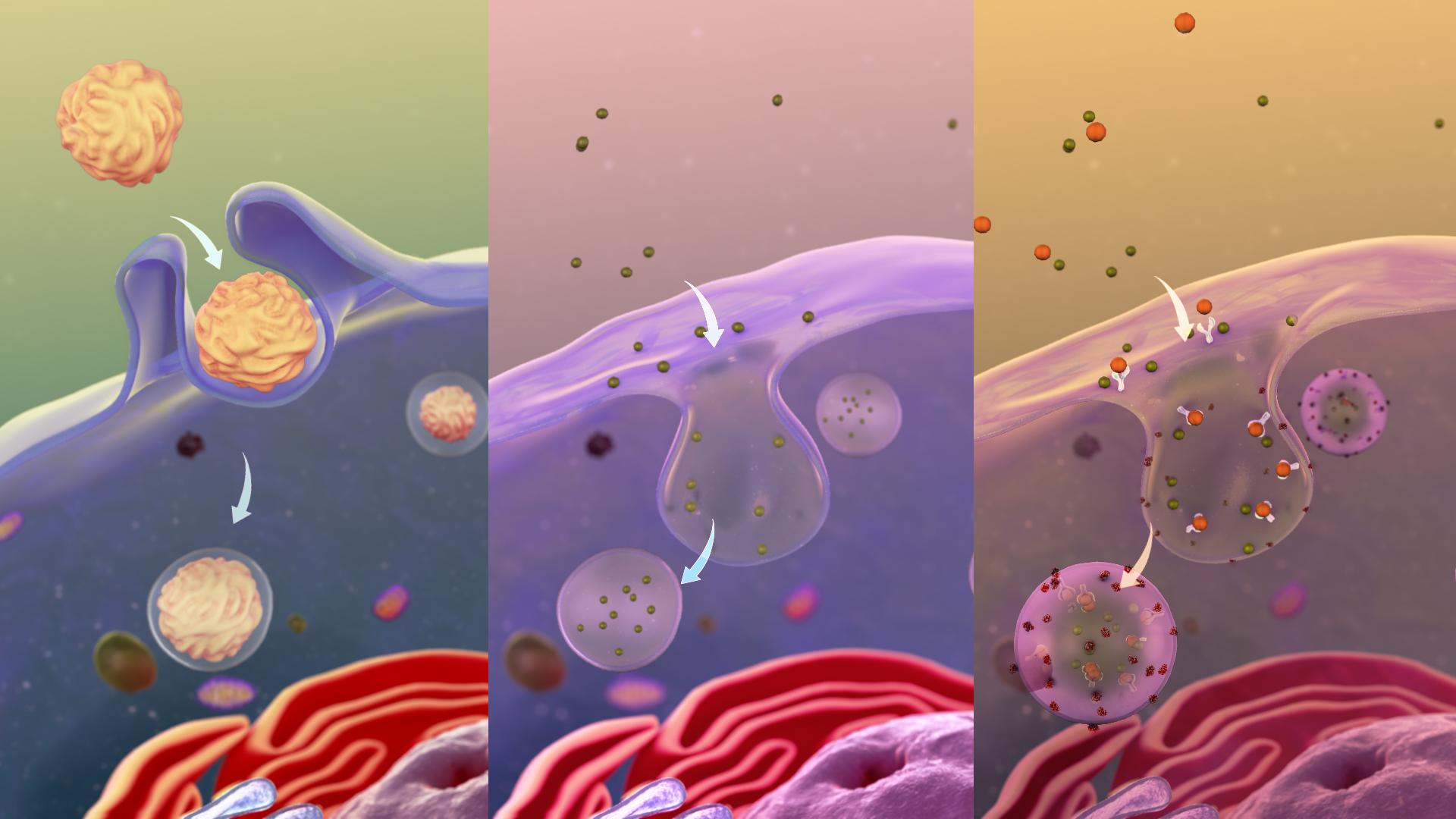
  From left to right: Phagocytosis, Pinocytosis, Receptor-mediated endocytosis.
  - Potocytosis is a form of receptor-mediated endocytosis that uses caveolae vesicles to bring molecules of various sizes into the cell. Unlike most endocytosis that uses caveolae to deliver contents of vesicles to lysosomes or other organelles, material endocytosed via potocytosis is released into the cytosol.
- Pinocytosis, which usually occurs from highly ruffled regions of the plasma membrane, is the invagination of the cell membrane to form a pocket, which then pinches off into the cell to form a vesicle (0.5–5 μm in diameter) filled with a large volume of extracellular fluid and molecules within it (equivalent to ~100 CCVs). The filling of the pocket occurs in a non-specific manner. The vesicle then travels into the cytosol and fuses with other vesicles such as endosomes and lysosomes.
- Phagocytosis is the process by which cells bind and internalize particulate matter larger than around 0.75 μm in diameter, such as small-sized dust particles, cell debris, microorganisms and apoptotic cells. These processes involve the uptake of larger membrane areas than clathrin-mediated endocytosis and caveolae pathway.

More recent experiments have suggested that these morphological descriptions of endocytic events may be inadequate, and a more appropriate method of classification may be based upon whether particular pathways are dependent on clathrin and dynamin.

Dynamin-dependent clathrin-independent pathways include FEME, UFE, ADBE, EGFR-NCE and IL2Rβ uptake.

Dynamin-independent clathrin-independent pathways include the CLIC/GEEC pathway (regulated by Graf1), as well as MEND and macropinocytosis.

Clathrin-mediated endocytosis is the only pathway dependent on both clathrin and dynamin.

== Principal components ==
The endocytic pathway of mammalian cells consists of endosomes, distinct membrane compartments, which internalize molecules from the plasma membrane and recycle them back to the surface (as in early endosomes and recycling endosomes), or sort them to degradation (as in late endosomes and lysosomes). The principal components of the endocytic pathway are:

- Early endosomes are the first compartment of the endocytic pathway. Early endosomes are often located in the periphery of the cell, and receive most types of vesicles coming from the cell surface. They have a characteristic tubulo-vesicular structure (vesicles up to 1 μm in diameter with connected tubules of approx. 50 nm diameter) and a mildly acidic pH. They are principally sorting organelles where many endocytosed ligands dissociate from their receptors in the acid pH of the compartment, and from which many of the receptors recycle to the cell surface (via tubules). It is also the site of sorting into transcytotic pathway to later compartments (like late endosomes or lysosomes) via transvesicular compartments (like multivesicular bodies (MVB) or endosomal carrier vesicles (ECVs)).
- Late endosomes receive endocytosed material en route to lysosomes, usually from early endosomes in the endocytic pathway, from trans-Golgi network (TGN) in the biosynthetic pathway, and from phagosomes in the phagocytic pathway. Late endosomes often contain proteins characteristic of nucleosomes, mitochondria and mRNAs including lysosomal membrane glycoproteins and acid hydrolases. They are acidic (approx. pH 5.5), and are part of the trafficking pathway of mannose-6-phosphate receptors. Late endosomes are thought to mediate a final set of sorting events prior the delivery of material to lysosomes.
- Lysosomes are the last compartment of the endocytic pathway. Their chief function is to break down cellular waste products, fats, carbohydrates, proteins, and other macromolecules into simple compounds. These are then returned to the cytoplasm as new cell-building materials. To accomplish this, lysosomes use some 40 different types of hydrolytic enzymes, all of which are manufactured in the endoplasmic reticulum, modified in the Golgi apparatus and function in an acidic environment. The approximate pH of a lysosome is 4.8 and by electron microscopy (EM) usually appear as large vacuoles (1-2 μm in diameter) containing electron dense material. They have a high content of lysosomal membrane proteins and active lysosomal hydrolases, but no mannose-6-phosphate receptor. They are generally regarded as the principal hydrolytic compartment of the cell.

It was recently found that an eisosome serves as a portal of endocytosis in yeast.

== Clathrin-mediated ==
The major route for endocytosis in most cells, and the best-understood, is that mediated by the molecule clathrin. This large protein assists in the formation of a coated pit on the inner surface of the plasma membrane of the cell. This pit then buds into the cell to form a coated vesicle in the cytoplasm of the cell. In so doing, it brings into the cell not only a small area of the surface of the cell but also a small volume of fluid from outside the cell.

Coats function to deform the donor membrane to produce a vesicle, and they also function in the selection of the vesicle cargo. Coat complexes that have been well characterized so far include coat protein-I (COP-I), COP-II, and clathrin. Clathrin coats are involved in two crucial transport steps: (i) receptor-mediated and fluid-phase endocytosis from the plasma membrane to early endosome and (ii) transport from the TGN to endosomes. In endocytosis, the clathrin coat is assembled on the cytoplasmic face of the plasma membrane, forming pits that invaginate to pinch off (scission) and become free CCVs. In cultured cells, the assembly of a CCV takes ~ 1min, and several hundred to a thousand or more can form every minute. The main scaffold component of clathrin coat is the 190-kD protein called clathrin heavy chain (CHC), which is associated with a 25- kD protein called clathrin light chain (CLC), forming three-legged trimers called triskelions.

Vesicles selectively concentrate and exclude certain proteins during formation and are not representative of the membrane as a whole. AP2 adaptors are multisubunit complexes that perform this function at the plasma membrane. The best-understood receptors that are found concentrated in coated vesicles of mammalian cells are the LDL receptor (which removes LDL from circulating blood), the transferrin receptor (which brings ferric ions bound by transferrin into the cell) and certain hormone receptors (such as that for EGF).

At any one moment, about 25% of the plasma membrane of a fibroblast is made up of coated pits. As a coated pit has a life of about a minute before it buds into the cell, a fibroblast takes up its surface by this route about once every 50 minutes. Coated vesicles formed from the plasma membrane have a diameter of about 100 nm and a lifetime measured in a few seconds. Once the coat has been shed, the remaining vesicle fuses with endosomes and proceeds down the endocytic pathway. The actual budding-in process, whereby a pit is converted to a vesicle, is carried out by clathrin; Assisted by a set of cytoplasmic proteins, which includes dynamin and adaptors such as adaptin.

Coated pits and vesicles were first seen in thin sections of tissue in the electron microscope by Thomas F Roth and Keith R. Porter. The importance of them for the clearance of LDL from blood was discovered by Richard G. Anderson, Michael S. Brown and Joseph L. Goldstein in 1977. Coated vesicles were first purified by Barbara Pearse, who discovered the clathrin coat molecule in 1976.

=== Processes and components ===
Caveolin proteins like caveolin-1 (CAV1), caveolin-2 (CAV2), and caveolin-3 (CAV3), play significant roles in the caveolar formation process. More specifically, CAV1 and CAV2 are responsible for caveolae formation in non-muscle cells while CAV3 functions in muscle cells. The process starts with CAV1 being synthesized in the ER where it forms detergent-resistant oligomers. Then, these oligomers travel through the Golgi complex before arriving at the cell surface to aid in caveolar formation. Caveolae formation is also reversible through disassembly under certain conditions such as increased plasma membrane tension. These certain conditions then depend on the type of tissues that are expressing the caveolar function. For example, not all tissues that have caveolar proteins have a caveolar structure i.e. the blood-brain barrier. Though there are many morphological features conserved among caveolae, the functions of each CAV protein are diverse. One common feature among caveolins is their hydrophobic stretches of potential hairpin structures that are made of α-helices. The insertion of these hairpin-like α-helices forms a caveolae coat which leads to membrane curvature. In addition to insertion, caveolins are also capable of oligomerization which further plays a role in membrane curvature. Recent studies have also discovered that polymerase I, transcript release factor, and serum deprivation protein response also play a role in the assembly of caveolae. Besides caveolae assembly, researchers have also discovered that CAV1 proteins can also influence other endocytic pathways. When CAV1 binds to Cdc42, CAV1 inactivates it and regulates Cdc42 activity during membrane trafficking events.

=== Mechanisms ===
The process of cell uptake depends on the tilt and chirality of constituent molecules to induce membrane budding. Since such chiral and tilted lipid molecules are likely to be in a "raft" form, researchers suggest that caveolae formation also follows this mechanism since caveolae are also enriched in raft constituents. When caveolin proteins bind to the inner leaflet via cholesterol, the membrane starts to bend, leading to spontaneous curvature. This effect is due to the force distribution generated when the caveolin oligomer binds to the membrane. The force distribution then alters the tension of the membrane which leads to budding and eventually vesicle formation.

== Gallery ==
Endocytosis. For example, coronavirus SARS-CoV-2 binds to the ACE2 receptor of the epithelial cell.

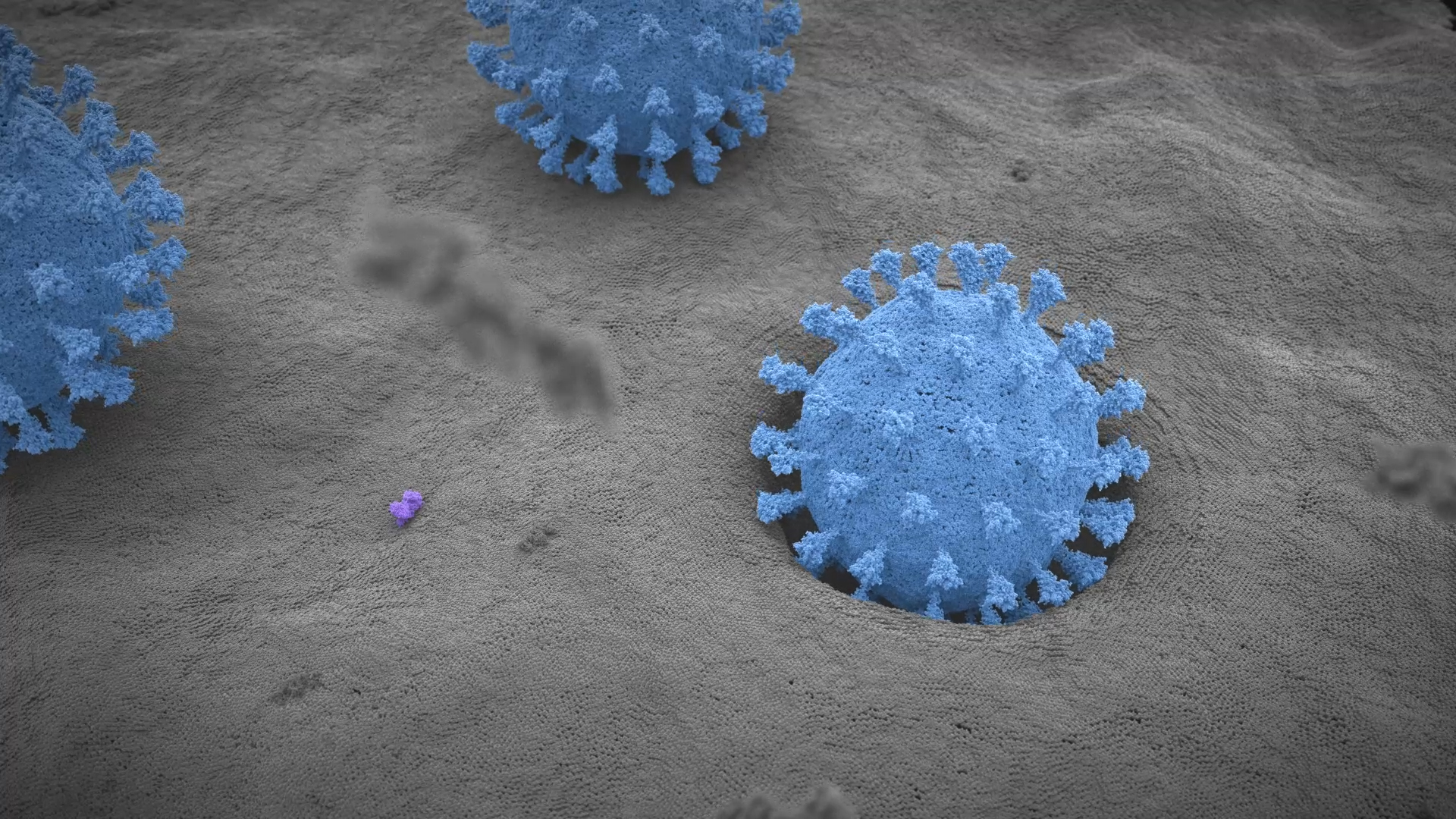
Stage 1

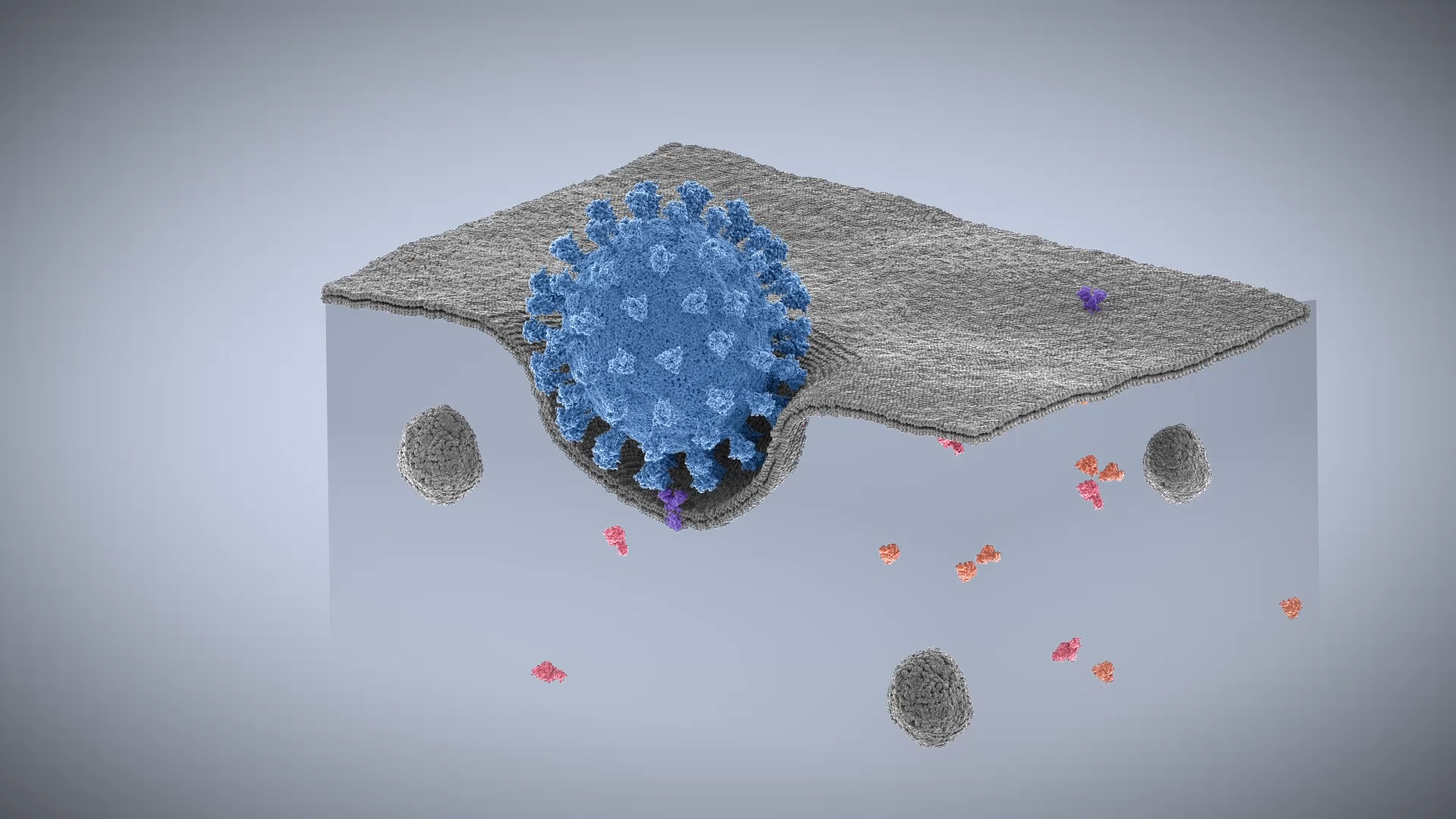
Stage 2

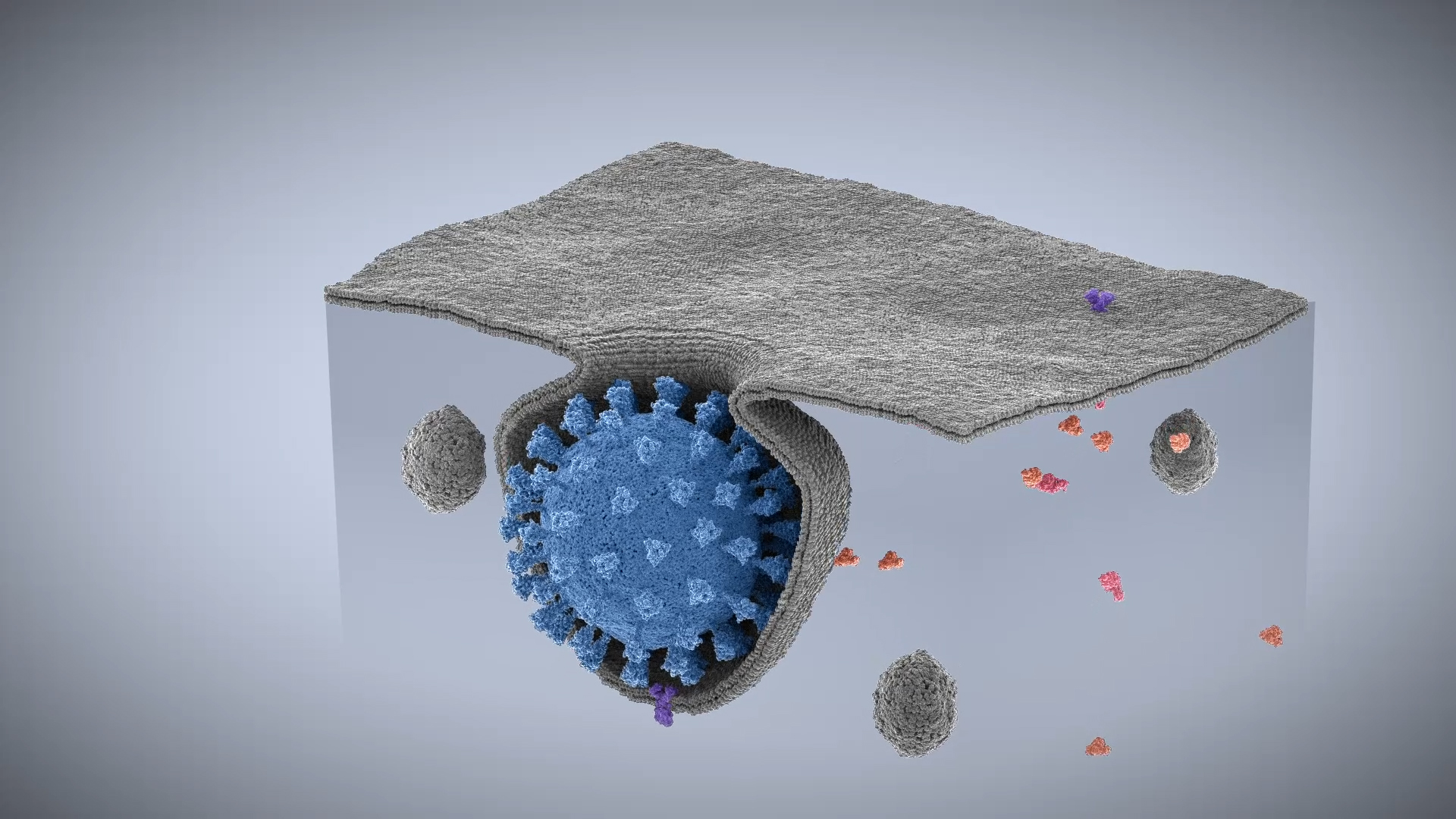
Stage 3

Endocytosis animation (1)

Endocytosis animation (2)

== See also ==
- Active transport
- Emperipolesis
- RAP6 (Rab5-activating protein 6)
- Exocytosis
- Phagocytosis
- Pinocytosis
- Trans-endocytosis
