= FAM32A =

Protein-coding gene in the species Homo sapiens

Identifiers
- Aliases: FAM32A, OTAG-12, OTAG12, family with sequence similarity 32 member A
- External IDs: OMIM: 614554; MGI: 1915172; GeneCards: FAM32A

Gene location (Human)
Chr.	Chromosome 19 (human)
Band	19p13.11	Start	16,185,380 bp
Band	19p13.11	End	16,192,046 bp

Gene location (Mouse)
Chr.	Chromosome 8 (mouse)
Band	8|8 B3.3	Start	72,973,574 bp
Band	8|8 B3.3	End	72,978,262 bp
RNA expression pattern
Bgee	Human / Mouse (ortholog); Top expressed in: granulocyte; monocyte; ganglionic eminence; mucosa of transverse colon; gallbladder; left coronary artery; popliteal artery; tibial arteries; Descending thoracic aorta; right coronary artery / Top expressed in: Ileal epithelium; substantia nigra; granulocyte; ascending aorta; fossa; aortic valve; facial motor nucleus; condyle; superior cervical ganglion; trigeminal ganglion; More reference expression data
BioGPS	n/a
Gene ontology
Molecular function	protein binding; RNA binding
Cellular component	nucleus; nucleolus
Biological process	cell cycle; apoptotic process; biological process
Sources:Amigo / QuickGO
Orthologs
Databases	NCBI: entry; OMA: entry
Species	Human	Mouse
Entrez	26017	67922
Ensembl	ENSG00000105058	ENSMUSG00000003039
UniProt	Q9Y421	Q9CR80
RefSeq (mRNA)	NM_014077	NM_026455
RefSeq (protein)	NP_054796	NP_080731
Location (UCSC)	Chr 19: 16.19 – 16.19 Mb	Chr 8: 72.97 – 72.98 Mb
PubMed search
- Wikidata
View/Edit Human	View/Edit Mouse

Protein FAM32A is a protein that in humans is encoded by the FAM32A gene.
