= Antagonistic assets =

Resources that produce the opposite of a synergistic effect

Antagonistic Assets are the opposite of complementary assets. These are defined as a combination of resources that jointly reduce value from the implementation of other resources. In other words, combining antagonistic assets produces an effect smaller than the sum of the individual effects of each resource.

== Use in chemistry ==
In chemistry antagonistic assets refer to two substances that when combined weaken or eliminate each other's effectiveness. For example, the effects of alcohol can be blocked by caffeine, which mediates alcohol's somnogenic and ataxic effects. Antagonistic assets are the basis of many antidotes for example in the case of poisonings.

== Use in management ==
The notion of antagonistic assets has been proposed as a metaphor to describe resources available to businesses which have an effect opposite to complementary assets. This idea has been mainly used in literature referring to social entrepreneurship which is proposed to turn antagonistic assets into complementarities.
