= First pandemic =

The First pandemic may refer to:

- First plague pandemic (541), also known as the Plague of Justinian
- First cholera pandemic (1817–1824)

== See also ==
- "Pandemic" (South Park), 2008 season 12 episode 10, part 1 of 2, preceding the next episode "Pandemic 2"
- Pandemic (disambiguation)
- Second pandemic (disambiguation)
- Third pandemic (disambiguation)
- Fourth pandemic
- Fifth pandemic
- Sixth pandemic
- Seventh pandemic
