= Third pandemic =

The Third pandemic may refer to:

- Third plague pandemic 1855–1960
- Third cholera pandemic 1846–1860
- The Third Pandemic, a 1996 science fiction novel by Pierre Ouellette

== See also ==
- Pandemic (disambiguation)
- First pandemic (disambiguation)
- Second pandemic (disambiguation)
- Fourth pandemic
- Fifth pandemic
- Sixth pandemic
- Seventh pandemic
