= Second pandemic =

The Second pandemic may refer to:

- Second plague pandemic (1350), also known as the Black Death
- Second cholera pandemic (1829–1849)

== See also ==
- "Pandemic 2: The Startling" (South Park) 2008 season 12 episode 11, part 2 of 2
- Pandemic (disambiguation)
- First pandemic (disambiguation)
- Third pandemic (disambiguation)
- Fourth pandemic
- Fifth pandemic
- Sixth pandemic
- Seventh pandemic
