= Pandemic (disambiguation) =

A pandemic is a global epidemic or disease outbreak.

Pandemic may also refer to:

== Disease outbreaks ==
- List of epidemics and pandemics, for a particular one
  - COVID-19 pandemic, the global outbreak of coronavirus disease 2019

== Literature ==
- Pandemic (Cook novel), a 2018 medical thriller
- Pandemic (Sigler novel), the 2014 finale of the Infected sci-fi trilogy
- Pandemic!, a 2020 political philosophy book by Slavoj Žižek

== Television ==
- Pandemic (miniseries), a 2007 Hallmark Channel miniseries
- "Pandemic", a two-episode South Park story arc first broadcast in 2008 during the twelfth season
  - "Pandemic" (South Park), part one
  - "Pandemic 2: The Startling", part two
- Pandemic: How to Prevent an Outbreak, a 2020 Netflix documentary series

== Other media ==
- Pandemic (album), a 2020 rap release by Comethazine
- Pandemic (board game), a 2008 co-op strategy game
- Pandemic (comics), a character in Marvel's X-Men: Endangered Species
- Pandemic (film), a 2016 American zombie film
- Pandemic Studios, a defunct video games developer

== See also ==
- First pandemic (disambiguation)
- Second pandemic (disambiguation)
- Third pandemic (disambiguation)
- Fourth pandemic of cholera
- Fifth pandemic of cholera
- Sixth pandemic of cholera
- Seventh pandemic of cholera
- Pandemia, a 2006 novel
- Plandemic, a pair of 2020 conspiracy videos
- Endemic (epidemiology)
- Epidemic (disambiguation)
