= History of cholera =

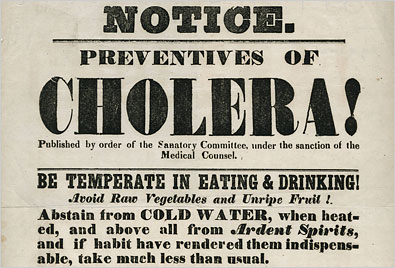
Hand bill from the New York City Board of Health, 1832. The outdated public health advice demonstrates the lack of understanding of the disease and its actual causative factors.

Seven cholera pandemics have occurred in the past 200 years, with the first pandemic originating in India in 1817. The seventh cholera pandemic is officially a current pandemic and has been ongoing since 1961, according to a World Health Organization factsheet in March 2022. Additionally, there have been many documented major local cholera outbreaks, such as a 1991–1994 outbreak in South America and, more recently, the 2016–2021 Yemen cholera outbreak.

Although much is known about the mechanisms behind the spread of cholera, this has not led to a full understanding of what makes cholera outbreaks happen in some places and not others. Lack of treatment of human feces and lack of treatment of drinking water greatly facilitate its spread. Bodies of water have been found to serve as a reservoir, and seafood shipped long distances can spread the disease.

Between 1816 and 1923, the first six cholera pandemics occurred consecutively and continuously over time. Increased commerce, migration, and pilgrimage are credited for its transmission. Late in this period (particularly 1879–1883), major scientific breakthroughs toward the treatment of cholera develop: the first immunization by Louis Pasteur, the development of the first cholera vaccine, and identification of the bacterium Vibrio cholerae by Filippo Pacini and Robert Koch. After a long hiatus, a seventh pandemic spread in 1961. It subsided in the 1970s, but has continued on a smaller scale. Outbreaks occur across the developing world to the current day. Epidemics occurred after wars, civil unrest, or natural disasters, when water and food supplies had become contaminated with Vibrio cholerae, and also due to crowded living conditions and poor sanitation.

Deaths across the Indian subcontinent between 1817 and 1860, in the first three pandemics of the 19th century, are estimated to have exceeded 15 million people. Another 23 million died between 1865 and 1917, during the next three pandemics. Cholera deaths in the Russian Empire during a similar time period exceeded 2 million.

== Pandemics ==
The first cholera pandemic occurred in the Bengal region of India, near Calcutta (now Kolkata), starting in 1817 through 1824. The disease dispersed from India to Southeast Asia, the Middle East, Europe, and Eastern Africa through trade routes. The second pandemic lasted from 1826 to 1837 and particularly affected North America and Europe, due to the result of advancements in transportation and global trade, and increased human migration, including soldiers. The third pandemic erupted in 1846, persisted until 1860, extended to North Africa, and reached South America, for the first time specifically affecting Brazil. The fourth pandemic lasted from 1863 to 1875, and spread from India to Naples and Spain, and to the United States in 1873. The fifth pandemic was from 1881 to 1896 and started in India and spread to Europe, Asia, and South America. The sixth pandemic started in India and lasted from 1899 to 1923. These epidemics were less fatal due to a greater understanding of the cholera bacteria. Egypt, the Arabian peninsula, Persia, India, and the Philippines were hit hardest during these epidemics, while other areas, such as Germany in 1892 and Naples from 1910 to 1911, also suffered severe outbreaks. The seventh pandemic originated in 1961 in Indonesia and is marked by the emergence of a new strain, nicknamed El Tor, which still persists (as of 2019) in developing countries.

Cholera did not occur in the Americas for most of the 20th century after the early 1900s in New York City. It reappeared in the Caribbean toward the end of that century and seems likely to persist.

=== First, 1817–1824 ===
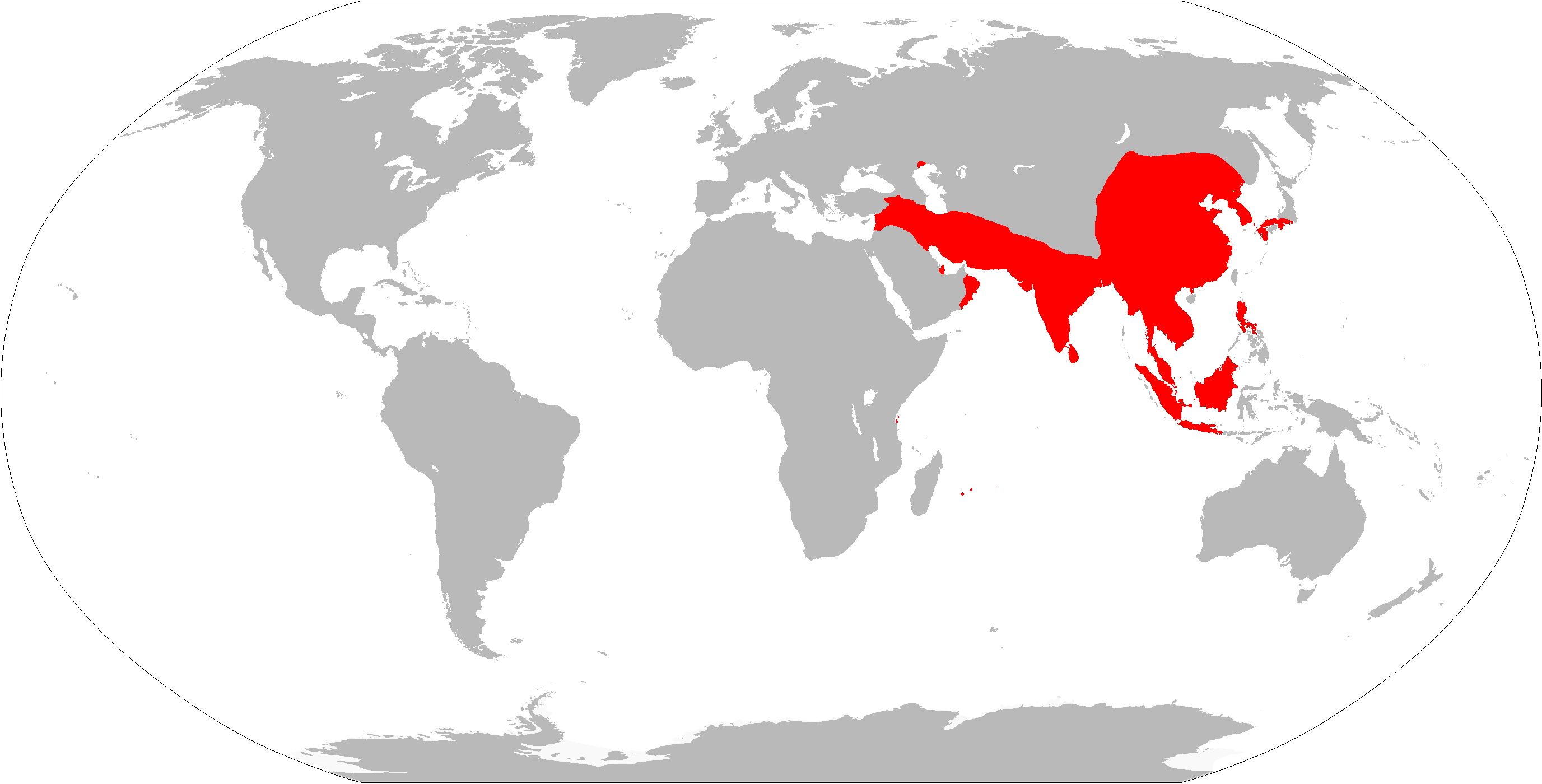
First cholera pandemic

The first cholera pandemic, though previously restricted, began in Bengal, and then spread across India by 1820. Hundreds of thousands of Indians and ten thousand British troops died during this pandemic. The cholera outbreak extended as far as China, Indonesia (where more than 100,000 people succumbed on the island of Java alone) and the Caspian Sea in Europe, before receding. In 1821, it is estimated that up to 100,000 deaths occurred in Korea.

=== Second, 1826–1837 ===
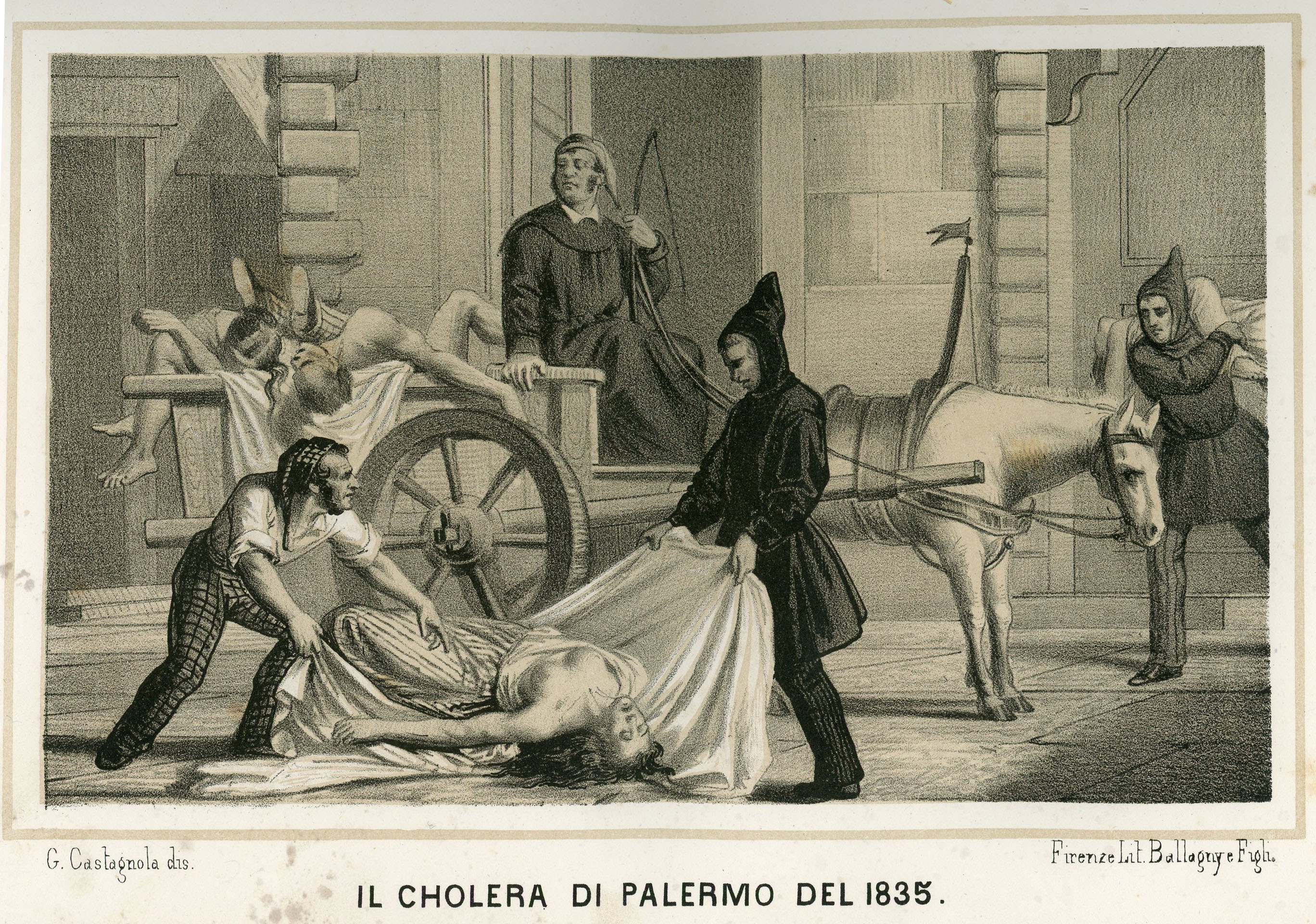
Disposal of dead bodies during the cholera epidemic in Palermo in 1835

A second cholera pandemic reached Russia (see Cholera Riots), Hungary (about 100,000 deaths) and Germany in 1831; it killed 130,000 people in Egypt that year. In 1832 it reached London and the United Kingdom (where more than 55,000 people died) and Paris. In London, the disease claimed 6,536 victims and came to be known as "King Cholera"; in Paris, 20,000 died (of a population of 650,000), and total deaths in France amounted to 100,000. In 1833, a cholera epidemic killed many Pomo, who are a Californian Native American tribe. The epidemic reached Quebec, Ontario, Nova Scotia, and New York in the same year, and the Pacific coast of North America by 1834. In the center of the United States territory, it spread through the cities linked by the rivers and steamboat traffic.

In Washington D.C. Michael Shiner, an enslaved laborer at the Washington Navy Yard recorded, "The time the colery [cholera] broke out in about June and July August and September 1832 it Raged in the City of Washington and every day they wher [were] twelve or 13 carried out to they [their] graves a day." By late July 1832, cholera had spread to Virginia and on 7 August 1832, Commodore Lewis Warrington confirmed to the Secretary of the Navy Levi Woodbury cholera was at the Gosport Navy Yard, "Between noon of that day, [1 August] and the morning of Friday [3 August], when all work on board her USS Fairchild stopped, several deaths by cholera occurred and fifteen or sixteen cases (of less violence) were reported."

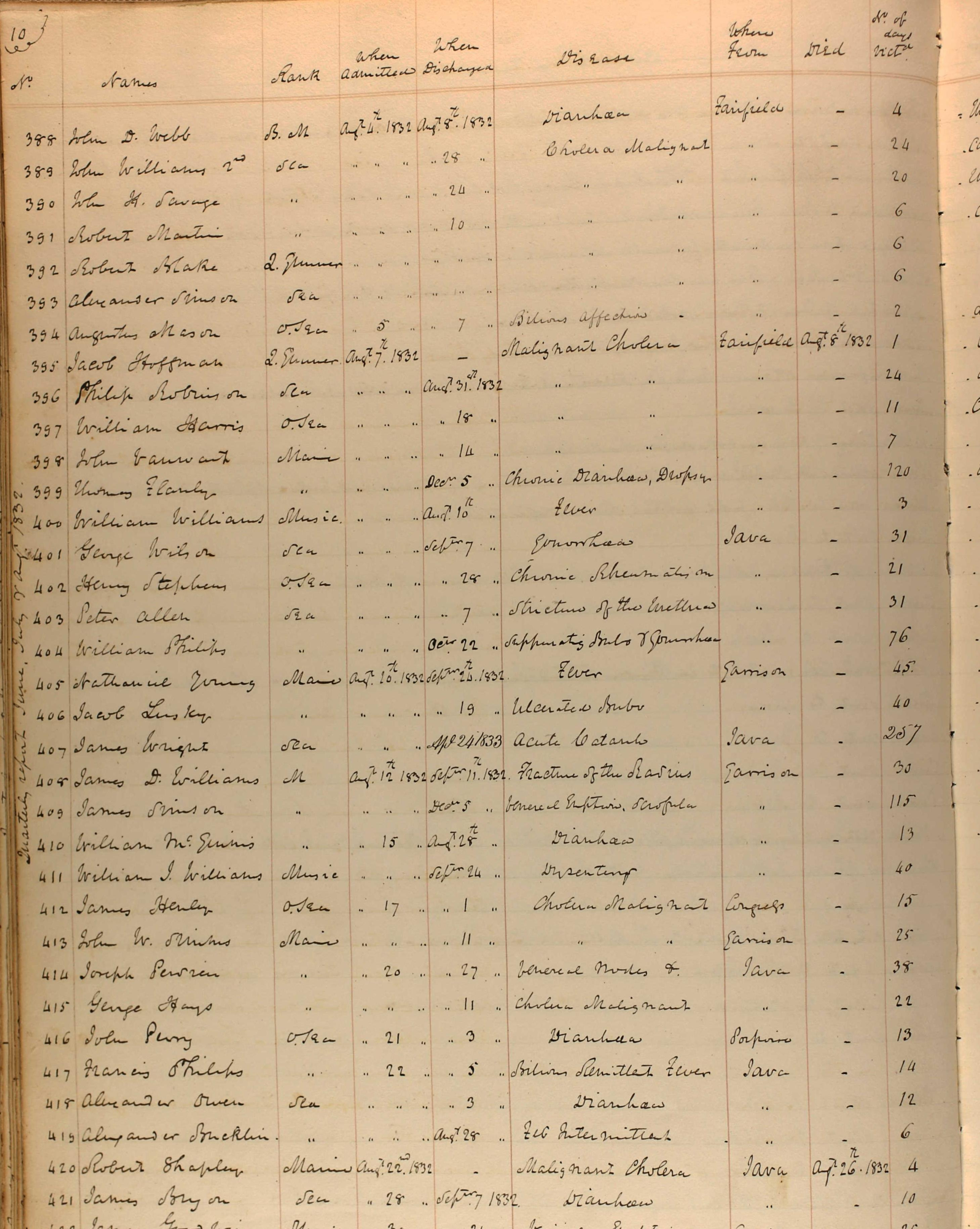
Register of Patients Gosport Naval Hospital August 1832 cholera cases

The epidemic of cholera, cause unknown and prognosis dire, had reached its peak. Cholera afflicted Mexico's populations in 1833 and 1850, prompting officials to quarantine some populations and fumigate buildings, particularly in major urban centers, but nonetheless the epidemics were disastrous.

In response to the second cholera pandemic, the Ottoman Empire and Egypt reformed their quarantine systems, following the western Mediterranean model. In 1831, the Egyptian Quarantine Board was established. It constructed Egypt's first modern lazaretto in Alexandria in 1833. In 1831, the Ottoman government set up the first permanent quarantine complex in Istanbul. In 1838, the Ottoman government established the Supreme Council of Health, which oversaw 59 quarantines. While largely useless against cholera, these quarantines shored up the two countries' epidemiological defenses against bubonic plague.

During this pandemic, the scientific community varied in its beliefs about the causes of cholera. In France, doctors believed cholera was associated with the poverty of certain communities or poor environment. Russians believed the disease was contagious, although doctors did not understand how it spread. The United States believed that cholera was brought by recent immigrants, specifically the Irish, and epidemiologists understand they were carrying disease from British ports. Lastly, some British thought the disease might rise from divine intervention.

=== Third, 1846–1860 ===
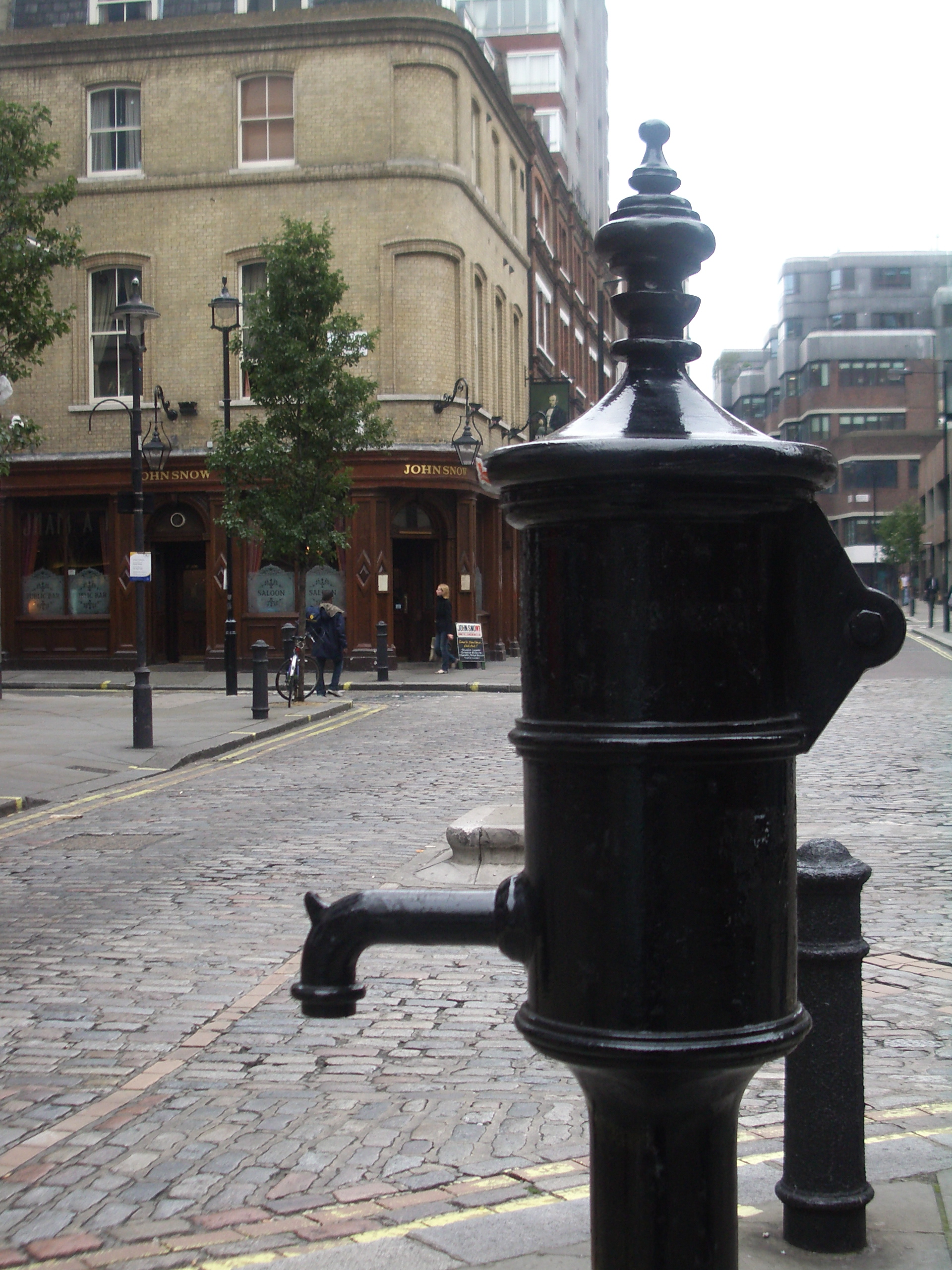
A pump memorializing John Snow for his study of contaminated water as a likely source of cholera during the 1854 Broad Street Cholera outbreak

The third cholera pandemic deeply affected Russia, with over one million deaths. Over 15,000 people died of cholera in Mecca in 1846. A two-year outbreak began in England and Wales in 1848, and claimed 52,000 lives.

In 1849, a second major outbreak occurred in France. In London, it was the worst outbreak in the city's history, claiming 14,137 lives, over twice as many as the 1832 outbreak. Cholera hit Ireland in 1849 and killed many of the Irish Famine survivors, already weakened by starvation and fever. In 1849, cholera claimed 5,308 lives in the major port city of Liverpool, England, an embarkation point for immigrants to North America, and 1,834 in Hull, England. In Vietnam and Cambodia, cholera hit in summer 1849, killing approximately 589,000 to 800,000 people within one year, along with its consequential famine.

An outbreak in North America took the life of former U.S. President James K. Polk. Cholera, believed spread from Irish immigrant ships from England, spread throughout the Mississippi river system, killing over 4,500 in St. Louis and over 3,000 in New Orleans. Thousands died in New York, a major destination for Irish immigrants. Cholera claimed 200,000 victims in Mexico.

That year, cholera was transmitted along the California, Mormon, and Oregon Trails as 6,000 to 12,000 are believed to have died on their way to the California Gold Rush, Utah and Oregon in the cholera years of 1849–1855. It is believed more than 150,000 Americans died during the two pandemics between 1832 and 1849.

In 1851, a ship coming from Cuba carried the disease to Gran Canaria. It is considered that more than 6,000 people died in the island during summer, out of a population of 58,000.

In 1852, cholera spread east to the Dutch East Indies and later was carried to Japan in 1854. The Philippines were infected in 1858 and Korea in 1859. In 1859, an outbreak in Bengal contributed to transmission of the disease by travelers and troops to Iran, Iraq, Arabia, and Russia. Japan suffered at least seven major outbreaks of cholera between 1858 and 1902. Between 100,000 and 200,000 people died of cholera in Tokyo in an outbreak in 1858–1860.

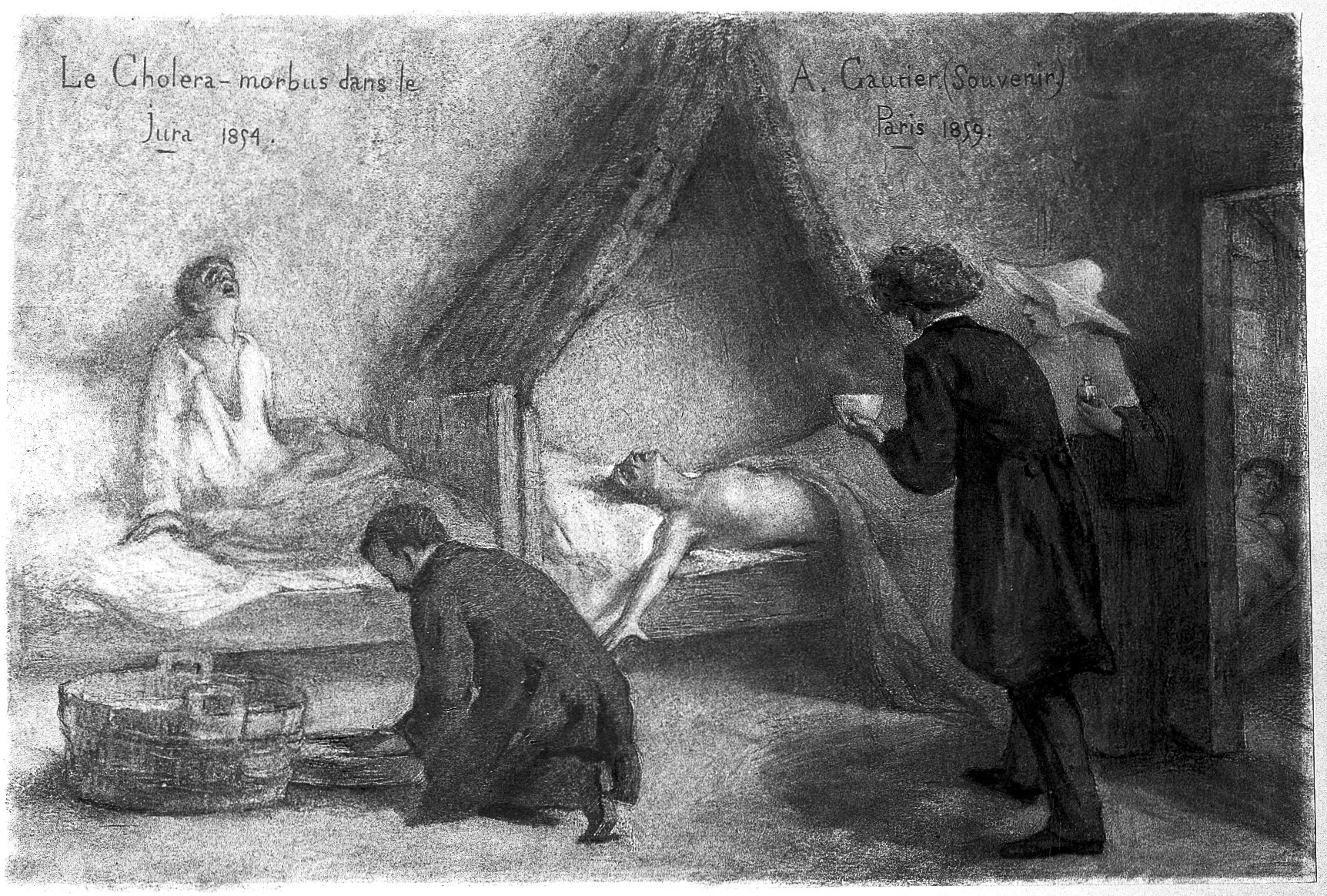
Patients suffering from cholera in 1854

In 1854, an outbreak of cholera in Chicago took the lives of 5.5 percent of the population (about 3,500 people). Providence, Rhode Island, suffered an outbreak so widespread that for the next thirty years, 1854 was known there as "The Year of Cholera." In 1853–1854, London's epidemic claimed 10,739 lives. The 1854 Broad Street Cholera outbreak in London ended after the physician John Snow identified a neighborhood Broad Street pump as contaminated and convinced officials to remove its handle to prevent people from drawing water there. His study proved contaminated water was the main agent spreading cholera, although he did not identify the contaminant. It would take many years for this message to be believed and fully acted upon. In Spain, over 236,000 died of cholera in the epidemic of 1854–1855. The disease reached South America in 1854 and 1855, with victims in Venezuela and Brazil. During the third pandemic, residents of Tunisia, which had not been affected by the two previous pandemics, thought Europeans had brought the disease. They blamed their sanitation practices. Some United States scientists began to believe that cholera was somehow associated with African Americans, as the disease was prevalent in the South in areas of black populations. Current researchers note their populations were underserved in terms of sanitation infrastructure and health care, and they lived near the waterways by which travelers and ships carried the disease.

From November 10, 1855, to December 1856, the disease spread through Puerto Rico, claiming 25,820 victims. Cemeteries were expanded to allow for the burial of victims of cholera. In Arecibo, a large municipality of Puerto Rico, the number of people dying in the streets was so great that the city could not keep up. A man named Ulanga made it his responsibility to collect and carry the dead to the provisional Cementerio de los Coléricos.

=== Fourth, 1863–1875 ===
The fourth cholera pandemic of the century began in the Ganges Delta of the Bengal region and traveled with Muslim pilgrims to Mecca. In its first year, the epidemic claimed 30,000 of 90,000 Mecca pilgrims. Cholera spread throughout the Middle East and was carried to Russia, Europe, Africa and North America, in each case spreading from port cities and along inland waterways.

In late June 1865, the epidemic reached Constantinople (modern-day Istanbul) via the Ottoman frigate Moukbiri-surur, which arrived from Alexandria at the port of Kasımpaşa. Known locally as the "Great Cholera" (Büyük Kolera), the outbreak spread across every district of the city by mid-August and killed more than 30,000 people within 40 days. While official Ottoman bulletins initially reported fewer than 300 deaths per day, contemporary diplomatic and press dispatches noted that internal government tallies reached 1,600 to 2,000 fatalities daily at the epidemic's peak.

The pandemic reached Northern Africa in 1865 and spread to sub-Saharan Africa, killing 70,000 in Zanzibar in 1869–1870. Cholera claimed 90,000 lives in Russia in 1866. The epidemic of cholera that spread with the Austro-Prussian War (1866) is estimated to have taken 165,000 lives in the Austrian Empire, including 30,000 each in Hungary and Belgium and 20,000 in the Netherlands. Other deaths from cholera at the time included 115,000 in Germany, 90,000 in Russia, and 30,000 in Belgium.

In London in June 1866, a localized epidemic in the East End claimed 5,596 lives, just as the city was completing construction of its major sewage and water treatment systems (see London sewerage system); the East End section was not quite complete. Epidemiologist William Farr identified the East London Water Company as the source of the contamination. Farr made use of prior work by John Snow and others pointing to contaminated drinking water as the likely cause of cholera in an 1854 outbreak. Quick action prevented further deaths. In the same year, the use of contaminated canal water in local water works caused a minor outbreak at Ystalyfera in South Wales. Workers associated with the company and their families were most affected, and 119 died.

In 1867, Italy lost 113,000 lives; and 80,000 died of the disease in Algeria. Outbreaks in North America in the 1870s killed some 50,000 Americans as cholera spread from New Orleans to other ports along the Mississippi River and its tributaries. None of the cities had adequate sanitation systems, and cholera spread through the water supply and contact.

=== Fifth, 1881–1896 ===
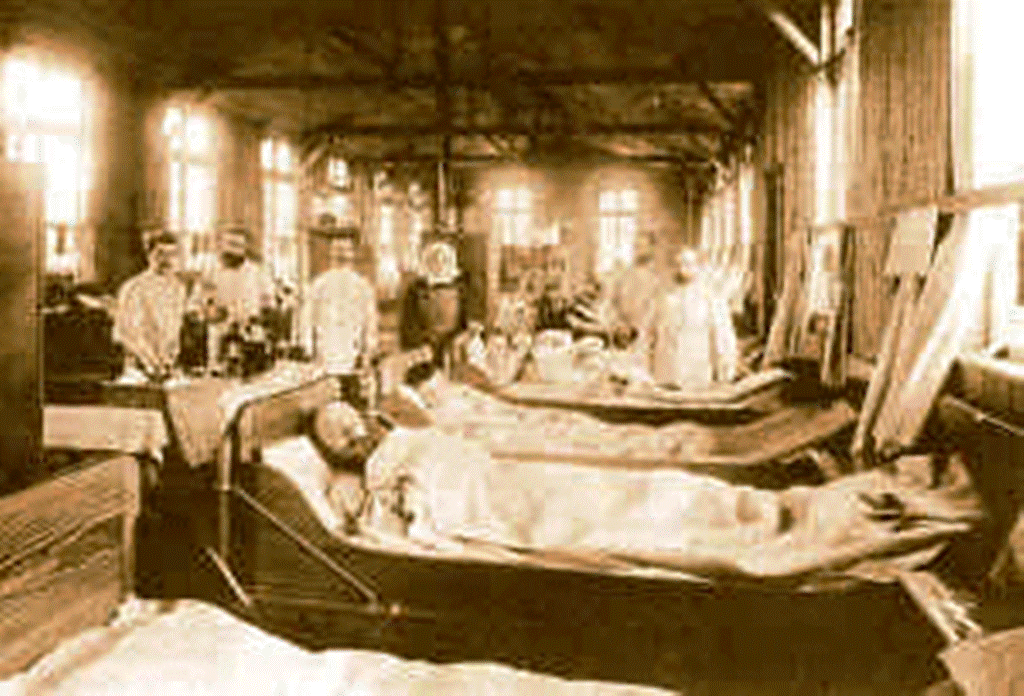
1892 cholera outbreak in Hamburg, hospital ward

According to A. J. Wall, the 1883–1887 part of the epidemic cost 250,000 lives in Europe and at least 50,000 in the Americas. Cholera claimed 267,890 lives in Russia (1892); 120,000 in Spain; 90,000 in Japan, and over 60,000 in Persia. In Egypt, cholera claimed more than 58,000 lives. The 1892 outbreak in Hamburg killed 8,600 people. Although the city government was generally held responsible for the virulence of the epidemic, it was not changed. This was the last serious European cholera outbreak, as cities improved their sanitation and water systems.

From the Russian Empire, cholera most likely spread to European countries. In Russia, cholera vibrio was found in Baku in 1892. The authorities of the city, despite the mortality of the population from cholera for a long time did not recognize the outbreak of the epidemic. The residents of Baku left the city, including traveling to Astrakhan, a city located in the delta of the Volga River. After quarantine measures were introduced in Astrakhan, rumors spread among the population that living people were being put in coffins, sprinkled with lime, and buried in cholera hospitals. These rumors provoked riots. During the riots, medical workers were killed, the cholera hospital was burned down, and the infected were sent home. The incidence of the disease increased dramatically after the riots. From June 14 to September 20, 1892, more than 3% of Astrakhan's population died of cholera, with 480 cases and 316 deaths per 10,000 inhabitants. This was the demographic maximum of the 1892 cholera epidemic. An estimate of excess mortality showed an increase of 278% in June and 555% in July over the same months in 1888–1894. Of all those admitted to Astrakhan hospitals, about 73% were workers living in hostels (shelters), about 5% were workers on ships, steamships, and barges, and 12% were artisans. The social composition by estates was as follows: 1983 peasants, 316 soldiers, 262 bourgeois, 12 Cossacks, 8 nobles and 5 clergymen. Natives of Astrakhan and the province accounted for about 11% of the cases, 89% were seasonal migrants. Many children were orphaned due to the high mortality rate. Because cholera is characterized by waterborne transmission, cholera epidemics were observed in large cities along the Volga River. Much of the empire was infested with cholera vibrio.

=== Sixth, 1899–1923 ===
The sixth cholera pandemic, which was due to the classical strain of O1, had little effect in western Europe because of advances in sanitation and public health, but major Russian cities and the Ottoman Empire particularly suffered a high rate of cholera deaths. More than 500,000 people died of cholera in Russia from 1900 to 1925, which was a time of extreme social disruption because of revolution and warfare.

Cholera broke out 27 times during the hajj at Mecca from the 19th century to 1930. The sixth pandemic killed more than 800,000 in India. The 1902–1904 cholera epidemic claimed 200,000 lives in the Philippines, including their revolutionary hero and first prime minister Apolinario Mabini. A 1905 governmental report mentioned the reappearance of Asiatic cholera, characterized it as noteworthy, and described a "very strict marine quarantine" and other measures being imposed in the archipelago to control it.

The last outbreak of cholera in the United States was in 1910–1911, when the steamship Moltke brought infected people from Naples to New York City. Vigilant health authorities isolated the infected in quarantine on Swinburne Island. Eleven people died, including a health care worker at the hospital on the island.

In 1913, the Romanian Army, while invading Bulgaria during the Second Balkan War, suffered a cholera outbreak that resulted in 1,600 deaths.

During the outbreak, due to cholera frequently being spread by immigrants and tourists, the disease became associated with either outsiders or marginalized groups in societies. In Italy, some blamed Jews and Romani, while in British India numerous Anglo-Indians ascribed the spread of cholera to Hindu pilgrims, and in the United States many accused Filipino immigrants of introducing the disease.

=== Seventh, 1961–present ===
As of March 2022, the World Health Organization (WHO) continues to define this outbreak as a current pandemic, noting that cholera has become endemic in many countries. In 2017, WHO announced a global strategy aimed at this pandemic with the goal of reducing cholera deaths by 90% by 2030.

The seventh cholera pandemic began in Indonesia, called El Tor after the strain, and reached East Pakistan (now Bangladesh) in 1963, India in 1964, and the Soviet Union in 1966. From South America, it spread into Italy by 1973. In the late 1970s, there were small outbreaks in Japan and in the South Pacific. There was an outbreak in Odessa in July 1970, and there were also many reports of a cholera outbreak near Baku in 1972, but information about it was suppressed in the Soviet Union. In 1970, a cholera outbreak struck the Sağmalcılar district of Istanbul, then an impoverished slum, claiming more than 50 lives. Because this incident was notorious, the district was renamed as Bayrampaşa. Also in August 1970, a few cases were reported in Jerusalem.

Damage of sanitation and water treatment facilities during the Gulf War, 2003 invasion of Iraq, and Iraqi insurgency (2003–2011) have also contributed to the spread of cholera, leading to outbreaks in 2005, 2007, and 2022.

== Other outbreaks ==
Vibrio cholerae has shown to be a very potent pathogenic bacterium causing many pandemics and epidemics over the past three centuries. However, most outbreaks are known to be self-limiting, meaning they come to an end after peaking, without human intervention. One of the mechanisms significantly determining the course of epidemics is phage predation. This process is strongly dependent on successful recognition of the bacteria by lytic phages, in which cell surface receptors play a crucial role. Bacteria can reduce their susceptibility by changing their surface receptors and preventing phage adsorption. In the case of V. cholerae, the changed receptor gene expression is due to an alteration in cell-density during its infection cycle, a process called quorum sensing (QS). The stool samples collected from patients contain clumps of bacterial cells, demonstrating the occurrence of cell-cell interaction in the latter stage of the infection cycle. QS is strongly regulated by two auto-inducer molecules, AI-2 and CAI-1. Evidently, these molecules will have a significant effect on the success of phage predation in V. cholerae infections.

A previous study has unravelled the mode of action of auto-inducers on preventing predation on the level of phage entry. The study has shown that the aforementioned auto-inducers downregulate the ten biosynthetic genes of the surface O-antigen, which is primarily used as a phage receptor for Vibriophages. This mechanism results in an increased phage resistance. It can be stated that the loss of the ability to produce the receptor, reduces the possibility of a phage-dependent limitation or even elimination of V. cholerae. This should be kept in mind when developing a treatment for enteric bacterial infections with phages as an intervention tool. Future approaches may include additional quorum regulators that operate as "quorum quenchers" to reduce quorum-mediated phage resistance.

=== 1990s ===
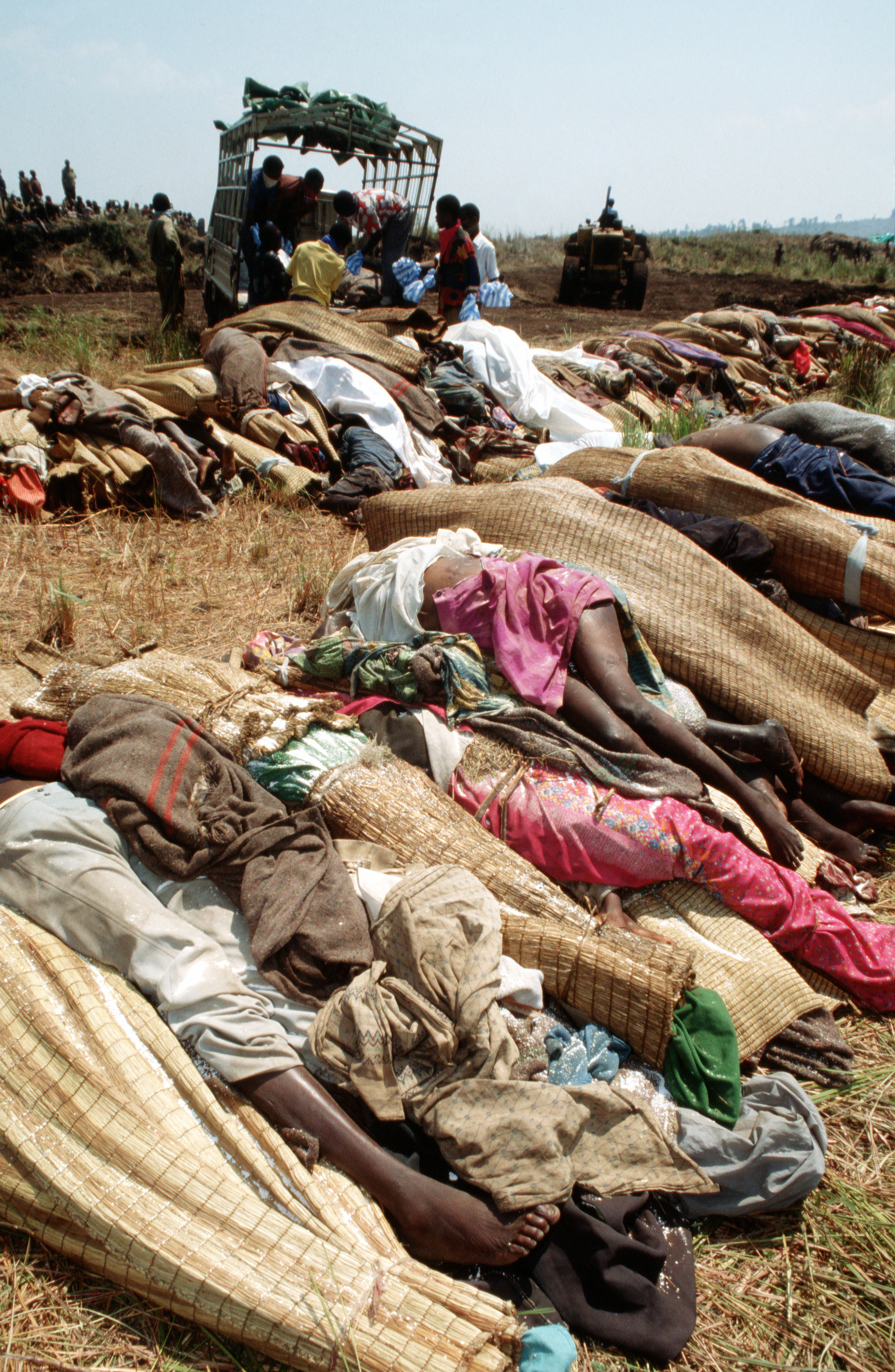
Bodies of Rwandan refugees who died during the cholera epidemic, October 1994

- January 1991 – September 1994: Outbreak in South America, apparently initiated when a Chinese ship discharged ballast water. Beginning in Peru, there were 1.04 million identified cases and almost 10,000 deaths. The causative agent was an O1, El Tor strain, with small differences from the seventh pandemic strain.

In 1992 a new strain appeared in Asia, a non-O1, nonagglutinable vibrio (NAG), which was named O139 Bengal. It was first identified in Tamil Nadu, India, and for a while displaced El Tor in southern Asia. It decreased in prevalence from 1995 to around 10 percent of all cases. It is considered to be an intermediate between El Tor and the classic strain, and occurs in a new serogroup. Scientists warn of evidence of wide-spectrum resistance by cholera bacteria to drugs such as trimethoprim, sulfamethoxazole and streptomycin.

- An outbreak in Goma, Democratic Republic of Congo in July 1994 claimed 12,000 lives by mid-August. During the worst period, it is estimated that as many as 3,000 people were dying per day from cholera.
- A persistent strain of Gulf Coast cholera, 01, has been found in the brackish waters of marshes in Louisiana and Texas in the United States. It could possibly be transmitted by shipments of seafood from those areas to other parts of the country. Medical personnel were advised to think of cholera when assessing symptoms for people who had not been traveling. There have been occurrences of this cholera in the South but no major outbreaks because of good sanitation and warning systems. There were more cases in two years from the Latin American epidemic, the El Tor strain, than in 20 years from the Gulf Coast strain.

=== 2000s ===
- In 2000, some 140,000 cholera cases were officially reported to WHO. Countries in Africa accounted for 87 percent of these cases.
- July–December 2007: A lack of clean drinking water in Iraq led to an outbreak of cholera. As of 2 December 2007, the UN had reported 22 deaths and 4,569 laboratory-confirmed cases.
- August 2007: The cholera epidemic started in Orissa, India. The outbreak affected Rayagada, Koraput and Kalahandi districts, where more than 2,000 people were admitted to hospitals.
- March–April 2008: 2,490 people from 20 provinces throughout Vietnam were hospitalized with acute diarrhea. Of those hospitalized, 377 patients tested positive for cholera.
- August–October 2008: As of 29 October 2008, a total of 644 laboratory-confirmed cholera cases, including eight deaths, had been verified in Iraq.
- November 2008: Médecins Sans Frontières reported an outbreak of cholera in a refugee camp in the Democratic Republic of the Congo's eastern provincial capital of Goma. Some 45 cases were reportedly treated between November 7 and 9.

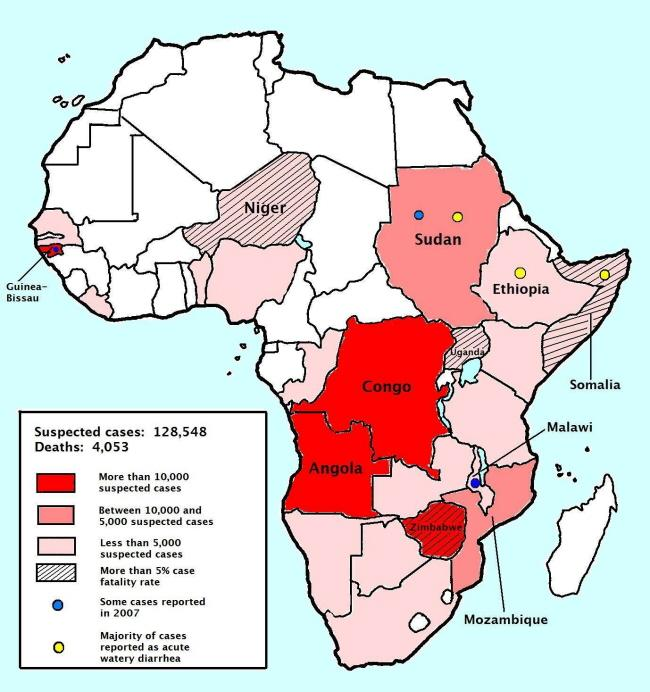
By 12 February 2009, the number of cases of infection by cholera in sub-Saharan Africa had reached 128,548 and the number of fatalities, 4,053.

- January 2009: The Mpumalanga province of South Africa confirmed over 381 new cases of cholera, bringing the total number of cases treated since November 2008 to 2276. Nineteen people died in the province since the outbreak.
- August 2008 – April 2009: In the 2008 Zimbabwean cholera outbreak, which continued into 2009, an estimated 96,591 people in the country were infected with cholera and, by 16 April 2009, 4,201 deaths had been reported. According to the World Health Organization, during the week of 22–28 March 2009, the "Crude Case Fatality Ratio (CFR)" had dropped from 4.2% to 3.7%. The daily updates for the period 29 March 2009 to 7 April 2009, list 1748 cases and 64 fatalities, giving a weekly CFR of 3.66% (see table above). Those for the period 8 April to 16 April list 1375 new cases and 62 deaths (and a resulting CFR of 4.5%). The CFR had remained above 4.7% for most of January and early February 2009.

=== 2010s ===
- August 2010: Cholera in Nigeria was reaching epidemic proportions after widespread confirmation of the disease outbreaks in 12 of its 36 states. 6400 cases were reported with 352 reported deaths. The health ministry blamed the outbreak on heavy seasonal rainfall and poor sanitation.
- October 2010 – present, Haiti and Dominican Republic: Late in October 2010, an outbreak was reported in Haiti. As of November 16, the Haitian Health Ministry reported the number of dead to be 1,034, with hospitalizations for cholera symptoms totaling over 16,700. The outbreak was blamed on a camp of Nepalese United Nations peacekeepers; this was disputed, but since acknowledged by the United Nations. The outbreak started on the upper Artibonite River; people first contracted the disease by taking water from this river. In addition, some scientists think the hurricane and weather conditions in Haiti worsened the consequences of the outbreak, and damaged sanitation systems, allowing it to spread. By November 2010, the disease had spread into the neighboring Dominican Republic. As of August 2016, the epidemic has officially sickened at least 790,000 people and killed more than 9,000 in Haiti. The real burden is probably much higher. In the neighboring Dominican Republic, there have been at least 32,000 suspected cases and 500 related deaths. In Haiti, the outbreak was worsened by Hurricane Matthew, which hit the southern portion of Haiti in fall 2016. The UN has acknowledged its role in the epidemic. In August 2016, the UN pledged to fight the disease and provide assistance for victims through a $400 million fund; But, as of April 2017, member states had contributed a meagre $10 million of the $400 million pledged.
- In January 2011, about 411 Venezuelan citizens attended a wedding in the Dominican Republic, where they ate ceviche (raw fish cured in lemon juice) at the celebration. By the time they returned to Caracas and other Venezuelan cities, some of these travelers were suffering from symptoms of cholera. By January 28, almost 111 cases had been confirmed by the Venezuelan Health Authorities, who quickly set up an 800 number for people to call who wondered whether they were infected. Internationally, Colombia secured its eastern border against immigrants and probable transmission of the disease. Dominican officials started a nationwide study to determine the cause of the outbreak, and warned residents of the imminent danger associated with the consumption of raw fish and shellfish. As of January 29, 2011, none of the cases in Venezuela proved fatal, but two patients were hospitalized. Since the victims had quickly sought help, the outbreak was detected and contained.
- 2011: Nigeria and Democratic Republic of Congo have had outbreaks; the latter has suffered years of disruption from warfare. Somalia has suffered a double hit of cholera and famine, associated with the refugee camps, limited sanitation, and severe drought, causing famine and lowered resistance.
- Cholera outbreak in 2011 and 2012 in multiple African nations, in all regions except North Africa; among the affected nations, Ghana has led an intense campaign for handwashing. In Sierra Leone, some 21,500 cases, with 290 deaths reported in 2012.
- On August 21, 2013, the United States State Department issued a security message warning U.S. citizens in or traveling to Cuba about an outbreak of cholera in Havana. It may be linked to a reported outbreak of cholera in eastern Cuba.
- An ongoing cholera outbreak in Ghana in 2014, hitting hard the capital Accra, has claimed some 100 lives and over 11,000 cases by September. It did not gain much notice because of being overshadowed by Ebola news in nearby countries. In 2011 and 2012 Ghana had cholera epidemics combined that totaled 16,000 cases and 130 deaths.
- September 2015: Ongoing cholera epidemic in Tanzania resulting in 13 deaths and almost 1000 cases so far—mainly in Dar es Salaam, but also in Morogoro and Iringa, caused by the O1 Ogawa strain. There had been an earlier outbreak in the lake Tanganyika area, starting in the refugee population who had fled from Burundi. 30 deaths and 4400 cases were reported in May 2015.
- Somalia, 2017: An ongoing outbreak started in January 2017 in Somalia. By the end of May, there were more than 50,000 cases, associated with 880 deaths; the case fatality rate is 1.7% (2.1% in children). Sixteen of the country's eighteen regions are involved, with the worst affected being Bay and Togdheer.
- In April 2017, an outbreak resurged in Yemen (it had started in October 2016). UNICEF and the World Health Organization (WHO) estimated that, by 24 June 2017, the total cases in the country exceeded 200,000, with 1,300 deaths. UNICEF and WHO attributed the outbreak to malnutrition, disrupted sanitation, and interrupted access to clean water due to the country's ongoing civil war. The effects of the outbreak were exacerbated by the collapse of Yemeni health services; many health workers have remained unpaid for months. The outbreak occurred ten days after the sewerage systems in the Yemeni capital of Sana'a stopped working on 17 April. Approximately half of the cases, and a quarter of the deaths, were among children. On 14 August, WHO stated that about 500,000 people in Yemen were affected by cholera. WHO called it "the worst cholera outbreak in the world".
- In August 2018, the Algerian Ministry of Health announced that 56 cases of cholera were confirmed in the regions of the capital Algiers and surrounding provinces of Tipaza, Blida, Bouira, Medea and Ain Defla, with reports of 2 deaths as a result of this epidemic. A water source in the town of Hamr El-Ain, Tipaza was found to have been the origin of cholera contamination. The access to the water source was restricted.
- On September 6, 2018, a cholera outbreak was declared in Zimbabwe. The Government declared a state of emergency on September 11, 2018. The outbreak has so far killed 48 people, and there are at least 98 confirmed cases as of September 27, 2018.

=== 2020s ===
Number reported cases of cholera

- An ongoing cholera outbreak was reported in several regions of Niger in August 2021. As of August 23, there were 1,770 cases of cholera reported with 68 deaths.
- Between October 2021 and 30 January 2023, there were 15,220 reported cases of cholera in Cameroon, with 306 deaths.
- Between January 2022 and 5 February 2022, there were 24,263 cases and 612 cholera deaths reported in Nigeria.
- Between January 2022 and 8 February 2023, there were 21,885 cases and 301 cholera deaths reported in the Democratic Republic of the Congo.
- Between March 2022 and 13 February 2023, there were 42,957 cases and 1,399 cholera deaths reported in Malawi.
- In June 2022 an outbreak in Mariupol, Ukraine during the Russian invasion of Ukraine, was announced by Mayor Boychenko.
- Following the June 2022 Afghanistan earthquake, the United Nations warned of a possible outbreak in the affected areas. In August 2022, over 400 cases were reported, and eight people died.
- Between August 2022 and 10 February 2023 there were 1,131 cases of cholera reported in Ethiopia, with 28 deaths.
- In September 2022, a cholera outbreak believed to be linked to irrigation of crops using contaminated water broke out in several regions in Syria. The United Nations said it presented a "serious threat to people in Syria and the region". Twenty-nine people died and a total of 338 cases were recorded. In October, 2022 Lebanon recorded two cholera cases in Akkar province, bordering Syria.
- Between 14 September 2022 and 19 February 2023, there were 5,237 cases and 37 cholera deaths reported in Mozambique.
- In October 2022, Haiti experienced a cholera outbreak.
  - 2022-2024 Southern Africa cholera outbreak
- Between October 2022 and 14 February 2023, there were 4,821 reported cases of cholera in Kenya, with 85 deaths.
- Between January 2023 and 13 February 2023, there were 122 reported cases of cholera in Zambia, with two deaths. During the same time period there were 122 cases reported in Burundi, with one death.
- In the first quarter of 2023, South Africa announced 21 cholera deaths, with 170 people admitted to a Hammanskraal hospital.
- On 28 February 2023, the Syrian opposition said that two people had died from a cholera outbreak in the northwestern region of the country, following the 2023 Turkey–Syria earthquake.
- The Sudanese cholera epidemic (2024–present) is an ongoing medical crisis in Sudan, Chad and South Sudan. It is reportedly the worst cholera outbreak in years.
- On 10 July 2026, a cholera outbreak in the Timbuktu Triangle, an Islamic State – West Africa Province (ISWAP) stronghold in Borno State, Nigeria killed nine ISWAP militants. ISWAP also executed two fighters after they became infected with cholera.

== False reports ==
A persistent urban myth states 90,000 people died in Chicago of cholera and typhoid fever in 1885, but this story has no factual basis. In 1885, a torrential rainstorm flushed the Chicago River and its attendant pollutants into Lake Michigan far enough that the city's water supply was contaminated. But, as cholera was not present in the city, there were no cholera-related deaths. As a result of the pollution, the city made changes to improve its treatment of sewage and avoid similar events.

== In popular culture ==
Unlike tuberculosis ("consumption"), which in literature and the arts was often romanticized as a disease of denizens of the demimondaine or those with an artistic temperament, cholera is a disease that today almost entirely affects the lower-classes living in filth and poverty. This, and the unpleasant course of the disease – which includes voluminous "rice-water" diarrhea, the hemorrhaging of liquids from the mouth, and violent muscle contractions which continue even after death – has discouraged the disease being romanticized. It is seldom presented at all in popular culture.

- In 1831 German composer Fanny Hensel wrote a cantata for the cessation of the second cholera pandemic in Berlin. The work was premiered in December at a birthday celebration for her father Abraham Mendelssohn Bartholdy, whose sister passed in the pandemic. The work was published posthumously in 1986 as the Oratorium nach Bildern der Bibel, but was referred to in writings by Hensel as her "Cholerakantate" and "Choleramusik" interchangeably.
- The 1889 novel Mastro-don Gesualdo by Giovanni Verga presents the course of a cholera epidemic across the island of Sicily, but does not show the suffering of the victims.
- In Thomas Mann's novella Death in Venice, first published in 1912 as Der Tod in Venedig, Mann "presented the disease as emblematic of the final 'bestial degradation' of the sexually transgressive author Gustav von Aschenbach." Contrary to the facts of how violently cholera kills, Mann has his protagonist die peacefully on a beach in a deck chair. Luchino Visconti's 1971 film version also hid from the audience the graphic course of the disease. Mann's novella was also adapted as an opera by Benjamin Britten in 1973, his last one; and as a ballet by John Neumeier for his Hamburg Ballet company, in December 2003.*
- W. Somerset Maugham's novel The Painted Veil (1925), explores a British couple's marriage against the work of the husband as a doctor in China during a 20th-century cholera epidemic. It was most recently adapted as a film of the same name (2006), starring Edward Norton and Naomi Watts. It did show people suffering the physical effects of the disease. Earlier adaptations in 1934 and 1957 kept the disease out of sight.
- In Gabriel Garcia Márquez's 1985 novel Love in the Time of Cholera, cholera is "a looming background presence rather than a central figure requiring vile description." The novel was adapted in 2007 for the film of the same name directed by Mike Newell.
- The 1995 film The Horseman on the Roof (Le Hussard sur Le toit) by Jean-Paul Rappeneau is about a cholera epidemic in the south of France.
- The 1997 American television film Contagious is about people dying in Los Angeles from a cholera outbreak.
- In the 2021 American sitcom Ghosts, a group of ghosts who died of cholera reside in the basement of Woodstone Mansion.

== See also ==
- List of epidemics and pandemics
