= Epidemic (disambiguation) =

An epidemic is a disease that spreads rapidly.

Epidemic may also refer to:

- A particular epidemic; see list of epidemics
  - COVID-19 pandemic (2019–present) of COVID-19 caused by SARS-CoV-2
  - Spanish flu (1918–1920) of influenza caused by H1N1 influenzavirus
  - Black Death (14th century) of bubonic plague caused by Yersinia pestis
  - Plague of Justinian (6th century) of plague caused by Yersinia pestis

== Books ==
- Epidemic!, a 1961 novel by Frank G. Slaughter
- Of The Epidemics, a medical book by Hippocrates

== Music ==
- Epidemic (band), a San Francisco Bay Area thrash metal band from the late 1980s and early 1990s
- Epidemic Records, a record label
- Epidemic Sound, a global royalty-free soundtrack provider based in Sweden
- Epidemic, an underground hip-hop group, based in South Florida, composed of rappers Hex One and Tek-nition.

=== Records ===
- Epidemic (album), a 1989 album by Polish heavy metal band Turbo
- Epidemic (EP), a 2014 EP by New Years Day
- E.P.idemic, a 2004 EP by Craig's Brother
- The Epidemics, a 1986 pop album by Indian violinist L. Shankar and British musician Caroline

=== Songs ===
- "Epidemic" (song), by Polo G
- "Epidemic", a song by Slayer on the 1986 album, Reign in Blood
- "Epidemic", a song by New Years Day on the 2014 EP, Epidemic

== Other uses ==
- Epidemic (film), a 1987 film
- Epidemic (video game), a first-person shooter video game
- Epidemic Marketing, a former viral marketing company
- Epidemic, the original Russian title of To the Lake, a 2019 television series

== See also ==
- Epidemic of Violence
- Sexidemic
- Endemic
- Pandemic (disambiguation)
