= 1913 Romanian Army cholera outbreak =

Cholera outbreak during the Second Balkan War

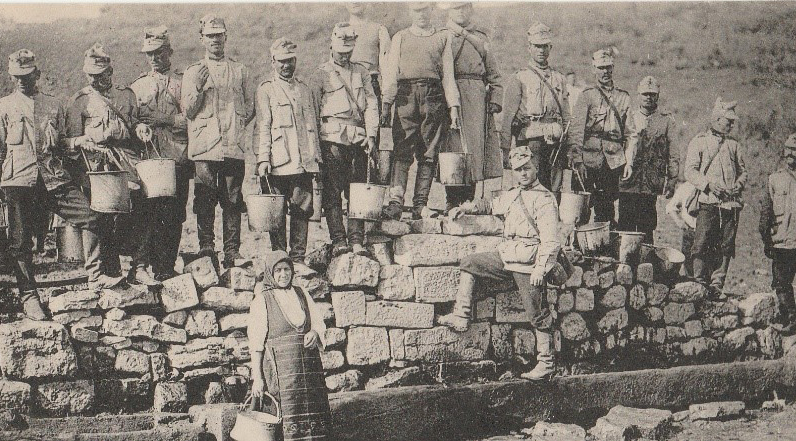
- Unverified water source used for the Romanian Army during the Second Balkan War
- Disease: Cholera
- Location: Kingdom of Bulgaria
- First outbreak: Bulgaria
- Index case: 13 July 1913
- Confirmed cases: 11,500–15,000
- Deaths: Around 1,600

The 1913 Romanian Army cholera outbreak was a cholera outbreak the Romanian Army suffered during the Second Balkan War of 1913 against the Kingdom of Bulgaria. This conflict was part of the Balkan Wars of 1912 and 1913. As Bulgaria was then fighting with Greece and Serbia, the invasion by Romania, which had a geographic and strategic advantage, was met with minimal Bulgarian resistance.

== History ==
The Romanian Army had to operate in a battleground with a low infrastructure and under the weather conditions of the summer. Furthermore, the little organization of the army's services provoked deficiencies in the alimentary and sanitary conditions of the Romanian soldiers. These conditions facilitated the spread of cholera. Thus, the first case of an infected Romanian soldier occurred on 13 July 1913. A week later, on 20 July, the cases were 2,000. This number rose so quickly due to ignorance of Romanian army officers, who ignored and even ridiculed the warnings by the army's physicians on several occasions.

It was quickly determined that vaccination had to begin, this happening on 22 July. Medical measures were quickly taken to curb the epidemic. The Romanian physician Ioan Cantacuzino began several series of inoculations of Romanian soldiers, and after the third one in 3 August, the cases were drastically reduced. Thanks to all this, the last case of cholera occurred in November and the disease could be mostly stopped before the Romanian soldiers returned to Romania. Marie of Romania, Princess and future Queen of Romania, organized a system of treatment and quarantine for the Romanian soldiers when they arrived, avoiding a possible spread of cholera among Romanian civilians.

Although figures might be conflicting, out of the approximately 400,000 Romanian soldiers who entered Bulgaria during the war, it is estimated that there may have been some 11,500–15,000 infected and a total of 1,600 dead. This made all Romanian casualties during the Second Balkan War non-military related, only caused by the cholera outbreak.

Romania accused the local Bulgarian population and Turkish prisoners of war for the cholera outbreak, while Bulgaria blamed the Romanian Army and its "poor hygiene conditions". Once the Second Balkan War ended and after the Treaty of Bucharest was signed, Romania gained Southern Dobruja from Bulgaria. A few years later, Romania itself suffered numerous cases of cholera as a result of its participation in the First World War. To treat them, Queen Marie of Romania applied the same procedures as in the 1913 epidemic.

== See also ==
- 1899–1923 cholera pandemic
