= El Tor =

Vibrio cholerae str. El Tor

Scientific classification
- Domain: Bacteria
- Kingdom: Pseudomonadati
- Phylum: Pseudomonadota
- Class: Gammaproteobacteria
- Order: Vibrionales
- Family: Vibrionaceae
- Genus: Vibrio
- Species: V. cholerae
- Strain: V. c. str. El Tor

Trionomial name
- Vibrio cholerae str. El Tor

Strain of bacterium

El Tor is a particular strain of the bacterium Vibrio cholerae, the causative agent of cholera. Also known as V. cholerae biotype eltor, it has been the dominant strain in the seventh global cholera pandemic. It is distinguished from the classic strain at a genetic level, although both are in the serogroup O1 and both contain Inaba, Ogawa and Hikojima serotypes. It is also distinguished from classic biotypes by the production of hemolysins.

== History ==
At the turn of the 20th century, the Ottoman government established six medical stations along the coast of the Sinai Peninsula to cater to pilgrims returning from Mecca. One of them was in El Tor (A' Tur as it is called today). Sick passengers were dropped off in one of the stations for treatment. In 1905, Felix Gotschlich, a German physician at the El Tor station identified vibrios in stool specimen of two pilgrims returning from Mecca. Though the pilgrims failed to show ante or post mortem evidence of cholera, the vibrios isolated agglutinated with the anti-cholera serum. He did not think it was cholera, since it was hemolytic for human and animal red cells, while the true Vibrio cholerae is not. At that time, there was no cholera epidemic in Mecca or at the El Tor station, and the two pilgrims died from other causes.

Later in 1905, Kraus and Pribram found that the bacteria, which produced soluble hemolysin, were more related to non-cholera vibrios; therefore, referred to all hemolytic vibrios as El Tor vibrios. In the early 1930s, A. Shousha, A. Gardner and K. Venkatraman, all researchers, suggested that only hemolytic vibrios agglutinated with anti-cholera serum should be referred to as El Tor vibrios. In 1959, R. Pollitzer designated El Tor as its own species V. eltor separate from V. cholerae, but six years later, in 1965, R. Hugh discovered that V. cholerae and V. eltor were similar in 30 positive and 20 negative characteristics. Thus, they were classified as a single species V. cholerae: however, Hugh believed the differing features between the two could be of epidemiological importance, so El Tor vibrios were further classified as V. cholerae biotype eltor (serogroup O1).

El Tor was identified again in an outbreak in 1937 but the pandemic did not arise until 1961 in Sulawesi. El Tor spread through Asia (Bangladesh in 1963, India in 1964) and then into the Middle East, Africa and Europe. From North Africa it spread into Italy by 1973. The extent of the pandemic has been due to the relative mildness (lower expression level) of El Tor, the disease has many more asymptomatic carriers than is usual, outnumbering active cases by up to 50:1. The outbreaks during this time frame are believed to be due to the rapid development of transportation and communication on an international level, as well as decreased sanitation levels in areas with increasing populations. In the late 1970s there were small outbreaks in Japan and in the South Pacific.

Molecular evidence, that is, a specific pulsed-field gel electrophoresis profile, suggests that the distinct genotype of El Tor strain which appeared in Calcutta in 1993, may have spread to Africa. In the country of Guinea-Bissau, it was responsible for an epidemic that began in October 1994 and continued into 1996.

== Epidemiology ==
An El Tor infection is relatively mild, or at least rarely fatal, and patients are asymptomatic for about a week. El Tor is able to survive in the body longer than classical cholera vibrios. This characteristic allows carriers to infect a greater population of people. In fact, V. cholerae biotype eltor can be isolated from water sources in the absence of an outbreak of cases. In extreme cases, persons can become long-term carriers; for example, Cholera Dolores, who tested vibrio positive nine years after her primary infection. El Tor is transmitted by the fecal-oral route. This route is the consequence of infected persons defecating near a water source, and uninfected persons consuming contaminated water. In addition, the bacteria can be transmitted by consuming uncooked food fertilized with human feces. Treatment of a cholera infection consists of replenishing lost fluid and electrolytes by intravenous or oral solutions, and by antibiotics. El Tor outbreaks can be prevented by better standards of sanitation, filtering and boiling water, thoroughly cooking seafood, and washing vegetables and fruits before consumption.
