= 1817–1824 cholera pandemic =

Health disaster

First cholera pandemic
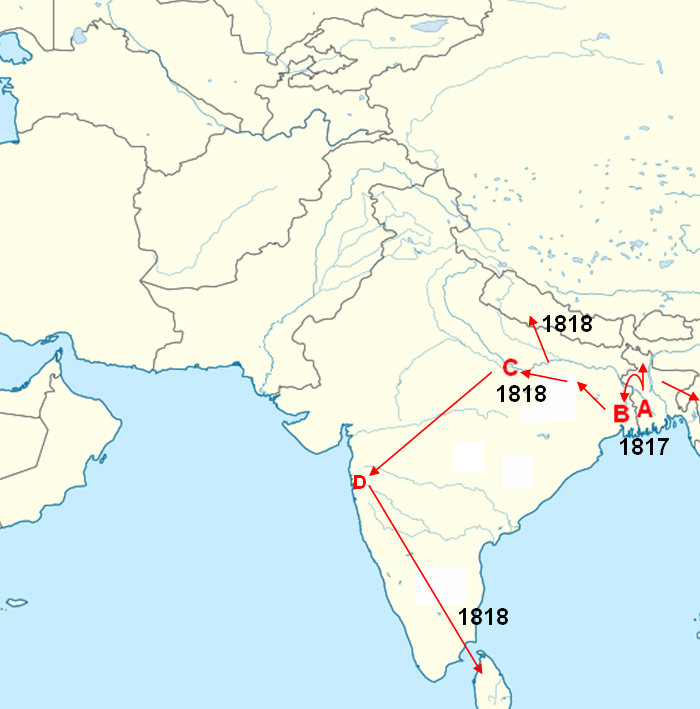
- Spread of the first cholera pandemic in India
- Disease: Cholera
- Pathogen: Vibrio cholerae
- Location: South Asia, South-East Asia, Middle East
- First outbreak: Calcutta, British India
- Dates: 1817–1824
- Deaths: 1–2 million in British India, 200,000 in Vietnam, 100,000 in Java, 100,000 in Korea, 30,000 in Bangkok, 18,000 in Basra, 100,000 in Iran, 750,000-800,000 in China and Japan

The first cholera pandemic (1817–1824), also known as the first Asiatic cholera pandemic or Asiatic cholera, began near the city of Calcutta and spread throughout South Asia and Southeast Asia to the Middle East, Eastern Africa and the Mediterranean coast. While cholera had spread across India many times previously, this outbreak went further; it reached as far as China and the Mediterranean Sea before subsiding. Millions of people died as a result of this pandemic, including approximately 10,000 troops in British service, which attracted European attention. This was the first of several cholera pandemics to sweep through Asia and Europe during the 19th and 20th centuries. This first pandemic spread over an unprecedented range of territory, affecting almost every country in Asia.

== Origin and initial spread ==
The name cholera had been used in previous centuries to describe illnesses involving nausea and vomiting. Today, cholera specifically describes illness caused by the Vibrio cholerae bacteria. There are numerous examples of epidemics prior to 1817 which are suspected as being cholera. In the sixth century BCE cholera-like symptoms were described by an Indian text. Indeed, descriptions of a disease in India from as far back as 2,500 years ago describe an illness reminiscent of cholera. Greek physician Hippocrates wrote about an illness resembling cholera about 2,400 years ago, as did Roman physician Galen roughly 500 years later in the 2nd century. In the 16th century, an outbreak of acute diarrhea was reported to have occurred in the East Indies by the Dutch. A similar outbreak was recorded in 1669 in China.

But, there is no evidence of "true Asiatic Cholera" prior to 1781, in which the first well-documented epidemic occurred. Having begun in southern India, it would later spread to eastern India and eventually Sri Lanka. Cholera was endemic to the lower Ganges River. At festival times, pilgrims frequently contracted the disease there and carried it back to other parts of India on their returns, where it would spread, then subside. The first cholera pandemic started similarly, as an outbreak that was suspected to have begun in 1817 in the town of Jessore. Some epidemiologists and medical historians have suggested that it spread globally through a Hindu pilgrimage, the Kumbh Mela, on the upper Ganges River. Earlier outbreaks of cholera had occurred near Purnia in Bihar, but scholars think these were independent events. In 1817, cholera began spreading outside the Ganges Delta. By September 1817, the disease had reached Calcutta on the Bay of Bengal and quickly spread to the rest of the subcontinent. By 1818 the disease broke out in Bombay, on the west coast.

== Spread beyond India ==
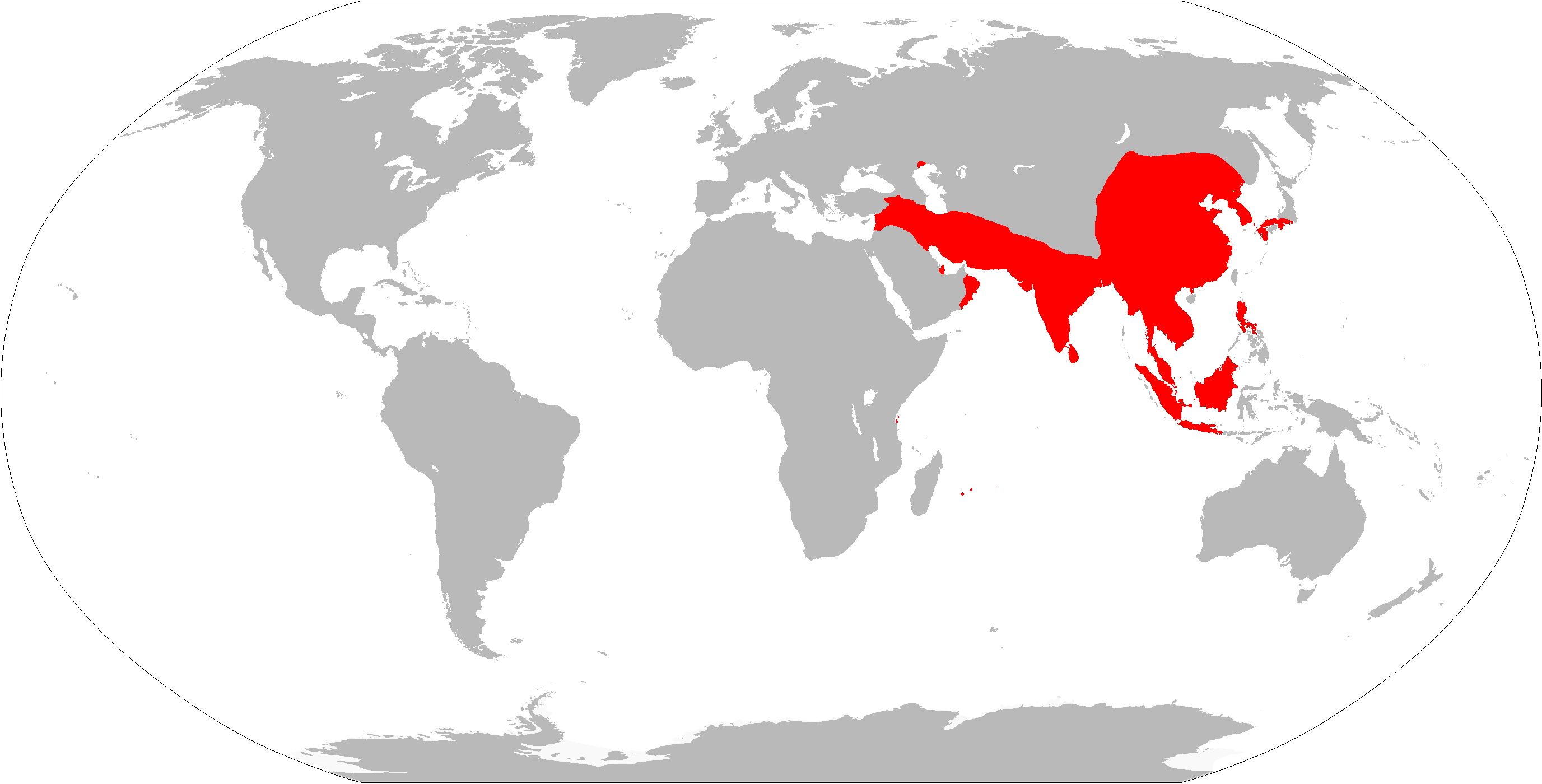
Distribution of cholera during the first cholera pandemic

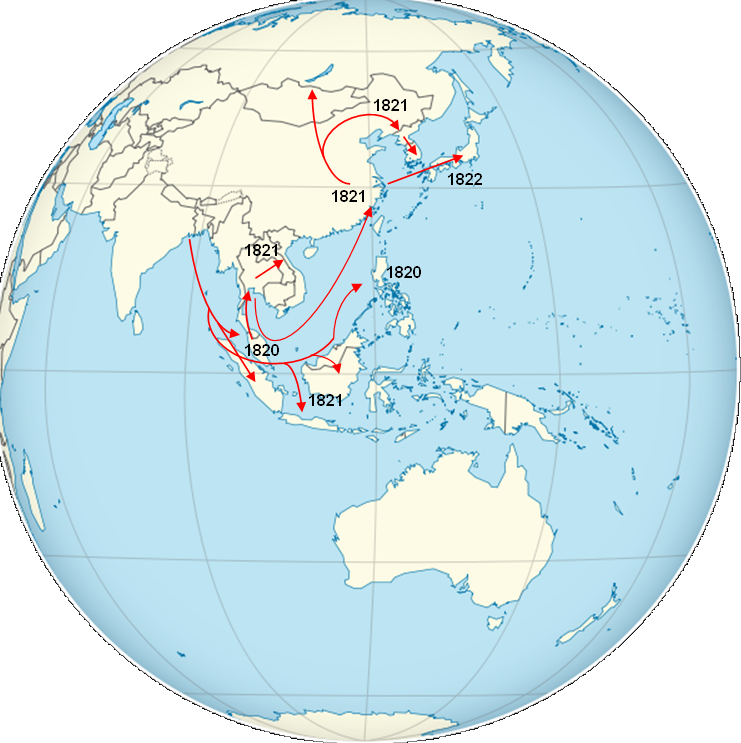
Cholera dissemination across Southeast and eastern Asia 1820–1822

After spreading beyond India, the first cholera pandemic hit other parts of Asia and the African coast the hardest. It would not be until later epidemics of cholera that it would ravage Europe and the Americas. In March 1820, the disease was identified in Siam, in May 1820 it had spread as far as Bangkok and Manila; in July the outbreak ravaged Vietnam; in the spring of 1821 it reached Java, Oman, and Anhai in China; in 1822 it was found in Japan, in the Persian Gulf, in Baghdad, in Syria, and in the Transcaucasus; and in 1823 cholera reached Astrakhan, Zanzibar, and Mauritius.

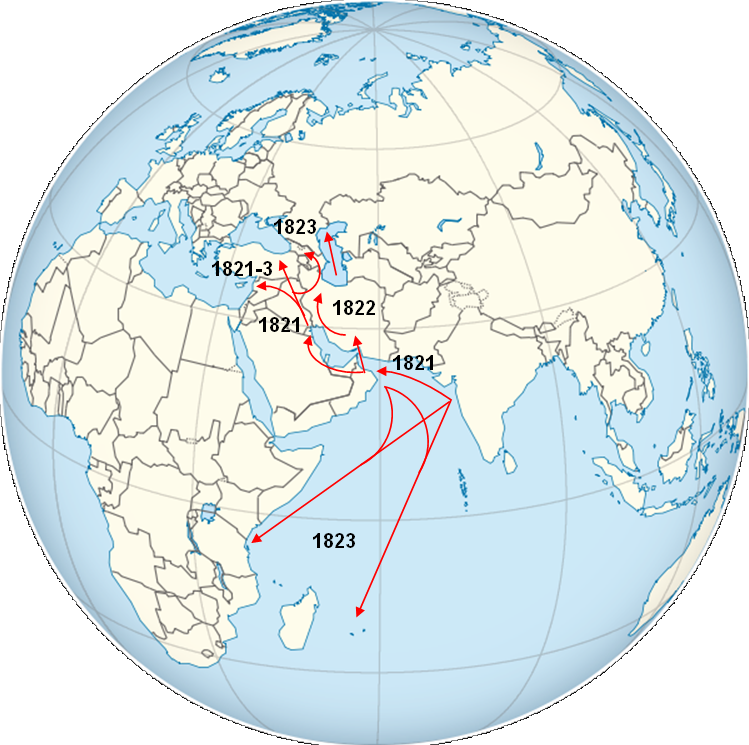
Cholera dissemination across Southwest Asia and Eastern Africa 1821–1823

When the epidemic reached Russia and specifically Astrakhan, their response was to formulate an anti-Cholera program in 1823. This program was headed by a German physician by the name of Dr. Rehmann. The Anti-Cholera program inspired the creation of a medical-administration board by Tsar Alexander I that inspired similar medical administration across Europe.

In 1824, transmission of the disease ended. Some researchers believe that may have been due to the cold winter of 1823–1824, which would have killed the bacteria in the water supplies.

The spread of the first cholera pandemic was closely linked to warfare and trade. According to economic history professor Donato Gómez-Diaz, "[advances] in commercial exchange and navigation contributed to cholera’s dispersion." Navy and merchant ships carried people with the disease to the shores of the Indian Ocean, from Africa to Indonesia, and north to China and Japan. During the Ottoman-Persian War of 1821–1823, cholera would affect both armies in what is modern-day Armenia. Hindu pilgrims spread cholera within the subcontinent, as had happened many times previously, and British forces carried it overland to Nepal and Afghanistan. In 1821, a British military force carried cholera to Oman after becoming infected with it in India.

== Total deaths ==
The total deaths from the epidemic remain unknown. Scholars of particular areas have estimated death tolls. For instance, some estimate that Bangkok might have suffered 30,000 deaths from the disease. In Semarang, Central Java, 1,225 people died in eleven days in April 1821. In total, over 100,000 people died as a result of cholera on Java during the first pandemic. Also in 1821, Basra, Iraq saw 18,000 deaths in less than a month's time. In the same year, it is estimated that up to 100,000 deaths occurred in Korea. Vietnamese royal archives recorded 206,835 people died from the disease. In the southwest of the Mekong Delta, the outbreak swept through the constructing Vĩnh Tế Canal, killing thousand of workers (most of them Cambodians) and triggered a Cambodian uprising in later that year. The well-known novelist Nguyễn Du died contracting the disease.

During the Ottoman–Persian War of 1821–1823, cholera and plague outbreaks also ravaged Qajar Iran. Contemporary Persian sources report that around 100,000 people died due to these diseases in the region. Ottoman historian Cevdet Pasha noted that the cholera epidemic severely impacted the Iranian army, forcing Abbas Mirza’s troops into retreat and leaving many soldiers unburied. According to Cevdet, the epidemic was one of the decisive reasons for Iran's decision to end the war and make peace with the Ottoman Empire.

As for India, the initially reported mortality rate was estimated to be 1.25 million per year, placing the death toll at around 8,750,000. However, this report was certainly an overestimation as David Arnold writes: "The death toll in 1817–21 was undoubtedly great, but there is no evidence to suggest that it was as uniformly high as Moreau de Jonnès presumed. [...] Statistics collected by James Jameson for the Bengal Medical Board showed mortality in excess of 10,000 in several districts. [...] Although reporting was sketchy, for the Madras districts as a whole the mortality during the height of the epidemic appears to have been around 11 to 12 per 1,000. If this figure were applied to the whole of India, with a population of some 120–150 million, the total number of deaths would have been no more than one or two million."

== Racism and xenophobia ==
According to historian Samuel Kohn, in antiquity, epidemics frequently brought members of a society together. However, some diseases such as cholera produced the opposite result, triggering blame and even violence against those people who were perceived as being from regions in which people were believed to be infected with the disease. Oftentimes, fear of cholera outbreaks would lead to increased racial tensions. The cholera pandemic's origin in India led to a rise in anti-Asian sentiment, especially towards Indian people and culture, in the West during the initial outbreak and following more outbreaks decades later. The disease was subsequently associated with Asia and South Asia, in particular, was seen as in some way to blame for cholera. Derision towards Indian cultural practices, especially Hindu pilgrimages, and hygiene following the initial outbreak were reported. Speaking about the anti-Asian sentiment that rose after the outbreak, British historian David Arnold wrote that "the Indian origins of cholera and its almost global dissemination from Bengal made the disease a convenient symbol for much that the west feared or despised about a society so different from its own". Medical professionals of the time were also noted for relying on moral judgments and generalizations of Indian people on pilgrimages. The sanitary commissioner of Bengal, David Smith, wrote that "the human mind can scarcely sink lower than it has done in connection with the appalling degeneration of idol-worship at Pooree". During the outbreak, the colonial authorities launched inquiries into the medical conditions of South Asian people on pilgrimages and eventually classified pilgrims as a "dangerous class" due their belief that many pilgrims were infected with cholera, placing them under surveillance. Historian Christopher Hamlin noted that European physicians attempted to distinguish the "new" strain of Asiatic cholera from the "old" strain, and that evidence for a Bengali origin of the pandemic were often based on 19th-century accounts which were "steeped in biases" against Hindu and Indian culture in general.

== Years after 1824 ==
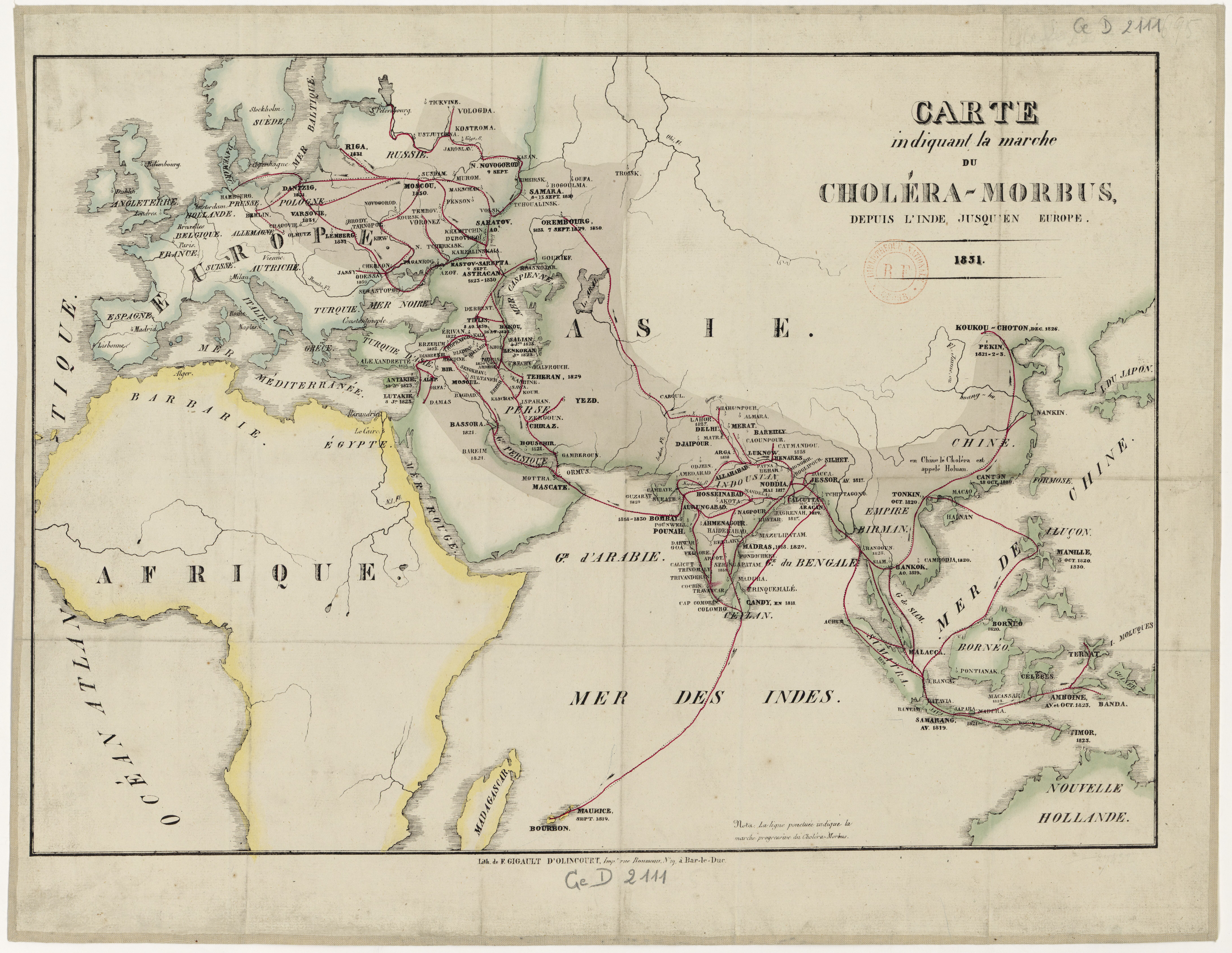
Cholera dissemination across Asia and Europe in 1817–1831

In the years after the pandemic subsided in many areas of the world, there were still small outbreaks, and pockets of cholera remained. In the period from 1823 to 1829, the first cholera outbreak remained outside of much of Europe. Its spread into Europe in the years after the initial outbreak started with the spread of the bacterium to the Russian empire yet again. Historians theorize that the spread back into Europe was largely due to its movement in the Russian river system and with passengers on the river. This movement of the virus in the rivers of Russia allowed cholera to reach England by 1832, and the Americas shortly afterward. The bacterium also was theorized to have spread into England from British soldiers returning home after tours of duty in India, many of them serving in the Bombay Army which was stationed where the pandemic broke out. Special deputations from the west traveled to Russia to observe the Russian response and formulate a plan to deal with these pocketed outbreaks. Reports from this committee of scientists were bleak, with a Dr. Rauch proclaiming that, "the cholera will not be cured by nature's powers alone without the help of art...". The conclusion of Dr. Rauch's findings was that no one standardized method was the key to controlling an outbreak. By 1835, these pockets of the bacterium claimed hundreds of thousands of lives. This timeline from 1826 to 1837 is widely described as the second cholera pandemic. The last of the seven main cholera pandemics in history extends into the modern day.

== See also ==
- Cholera outbreaks and pandemics
- Persecution of Jews during the Black Death
- Xenophobia and anti-Chinese racism related to the COVID-19 pandemic
