= USS Fairfield =

USS Fairfield may refer to the following ships of the United States Navy:

- USS Fairfield (1828), was a sloop-of-war launched 28 June 1828 and decommissioned on 3 February 1845
- USS Fairfield (AK-178), was a cargo ship launched on 6 February 1945 and decommissioned on 11 January 1946
