= 1863–1875 cholera pandemic =

One of several 19th century epidemics

Fourth cholera pandemic
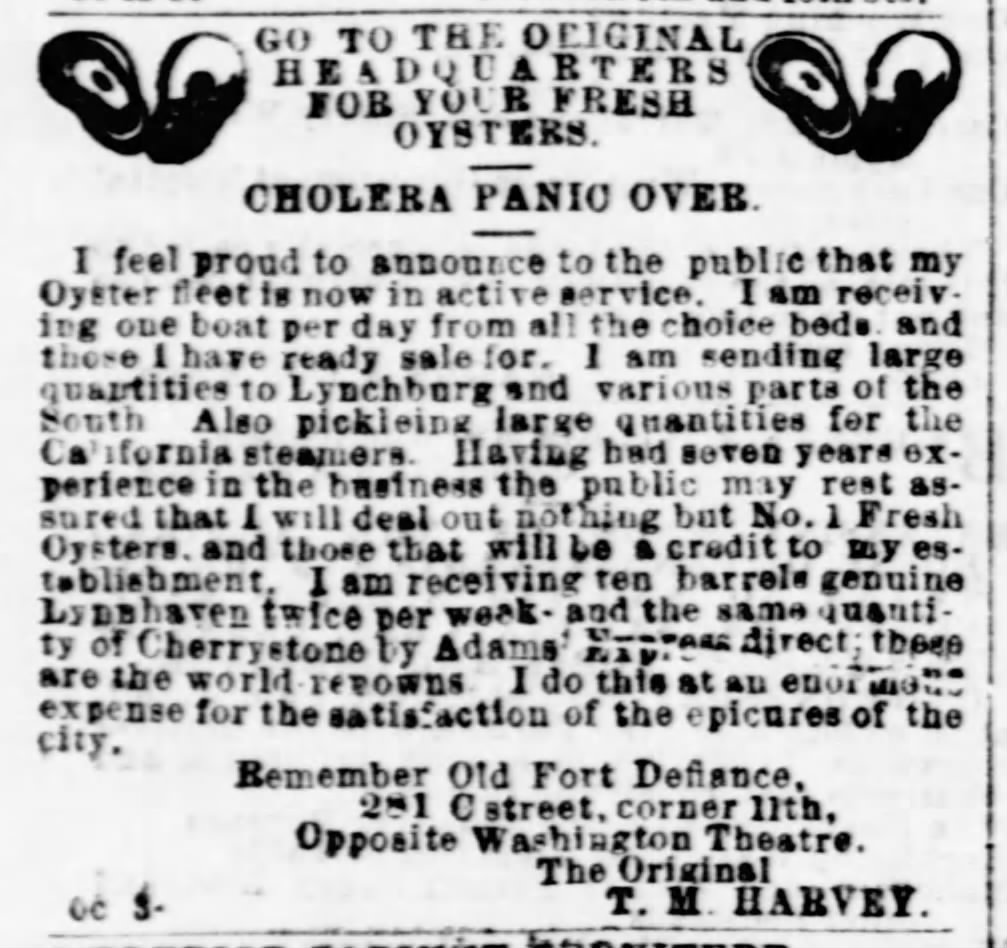
- Oyster seller in Washington D.C. claims "CHOLERA PANIC OVER" in October 1866
- Disease: Cholera
- First outbreak: Ganges Delta of the Bengal region
- Dates: 1863–1875

The fourth cholera pandemic of the 19th century began in the Ganges Delta of the Bengal region and traveled with Muslim pilgrims to Mecca. In its first year, the epidemic claimed 30,000 of 90,000 pilgrims. Cholera spread throughout the Middle East and was carried to the Russian Empire, Europe, Africa, and North America, in each case spreading via travelers from port cities and along inland waterways.

In 1866, there was a localized epidemic in the East End of London, primarily because the local section of the London sewerage system was still under construction and this region of London was experiencing overcrowding. The 1870s North American cholera outbreak spread from New Orleans via passengers along the Mississippi River and to ports on its tributaries.

== Ottoman Empire ==
In late June 1865, the epidemic reached Constantinople (modern-day Istanbul) via the Ottoman frigate Moukbiri-surur, which arrived from Alexandria at the port of Kasımpaşa. Known locally as the "Great Cholera" (Büyük Kolera), the outbreak spread across every district of the city by mid-August and killed more than 30,000 people within 40 days. While official Ottoman bulletins initially reported fewer than 300 deaths per day, contemporary diplomatic and press dispatches noted that internal government tallies reached 1,600 to 2,000 fatalities daily at the epidemic's peak.

== Cholera outbreaks associated with the Austro-Prussian War ==
The pandemic reached Northern Africa in 1865 and spread to sub-Saharan Africa, killing 70,000 in Zanzibar in 1869–70. Cholera claimed 90,000 lives in Russia in 1866. The epidemic of cholera that spread with the Austro-Prussian War (1866) is estimated to have taken 165,000 lives in the Austrian Empire (including 30,000 in Hungary), 30,000 in Belgium, and 20,000 in the Netherlands.

== Localized epidemic in the East End of London ==
In June 1866, a localized epidemic in the East End of London claimed 5,596 lives, just as the city was completing construction of its major sewerage and water-treatment systems; the East End section was not quite complete. It was also caused by the city's overcrowding in the East End, which facilitated the spread of the disease there. Epidemiologist William Farr identified the East London Water Company as the source of the contamination. Farr made use of prior work by John Snow and others, pointing to contaminated drinking water as the likely cause of cholera in an 1854 outbreak. In the same year, the use of contaminated canal water in local water works caused a minor outbreak at Ystalyfera in South Wales. Workers associated with the company, and their families, were most affected, and 119 died.

== New York City outbreak and creation of the New York Metropolitan Board of Health ==
The deaths of more than 1,100 people in New York City in 1866 resulted in the establishment of the New York Metropolitan Board of Health.

== 1870s North American outbreak spreading from New Orleans ==
In 1867, Italy lost 113,000 to cholera, and 80,000 died of the disease in Algeria. Outbreaks in North America in the 1870s killed some 50,000 Americans as cholera spread from New Orleans via passengers along the Mississippi River and to ports on its tributaries.

== See also ==
- Cholera outbreaks and pandemics
