= Seventh cholera pandemic =

Seventh major cholera pandemic

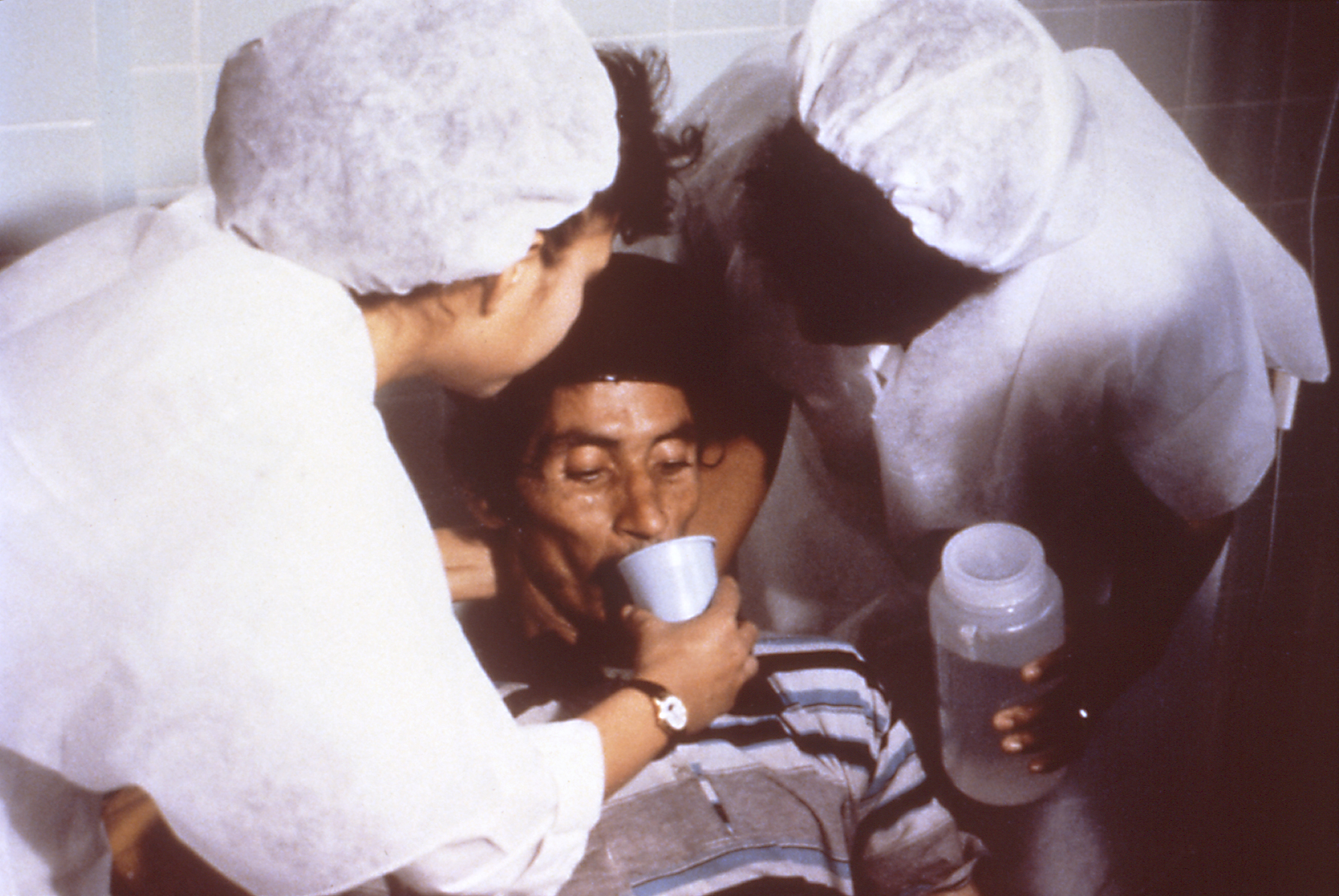
- Cholera rehydration nurses
- Disease: Cholera
- Pathogen: Vibrio cholerae biotype El Tor
- Location: Asia, Africa, Europe, the Americas
- First outbreak: Makassar, South Sulawesi
- Arrival date: 1961
- Confirmed cases: 1,126,229

The seventh major outbreak of cholera began in 1961 and is ongoing. Cholera has become endemic in many countries. In 2017, the World Health Organization announced a global strategy aiming to end the pandemic by 2030.

This pandemic is based on the strain called El Tor; it started in Indonesia in 1961 and spread to East Pakistan (now Bangladesh), by 1963. It went to India in 1964, and into the Soviet Union by 1966. In July 1970, there was an outbreak in Odessa (now Ukraine) and in 1972 there were reports of outbreaks in Baku, but the Soviet Union suppressed this information. Cholera reached Italy in 1973 from North Africa. Japan and the South Pacific saw a few outbreaks by the late 1970s. In 1971, the number of cases reported worldwide was 155,000. But in 1991, it reached 570,000. The spread of the disease was helped by modern transportation and mass migrations. Mortality rates, however, dropped markedly as governments began modern curative and preventive measures. The usual mortality rate of 50% dropped to 10% by the 1980s and less than 3% by the 1990s.

In 1991, the strain made a comeback in Latin America. It began in Peru, where it killed roughly 10,000 people. Research has traced the origin of the strain to the seventh cholera pandemic. Researchers initially suspected the strain came to Latin America through Asia from contaminated water, but samples from Latin America and samples from Africa were found to be identical.

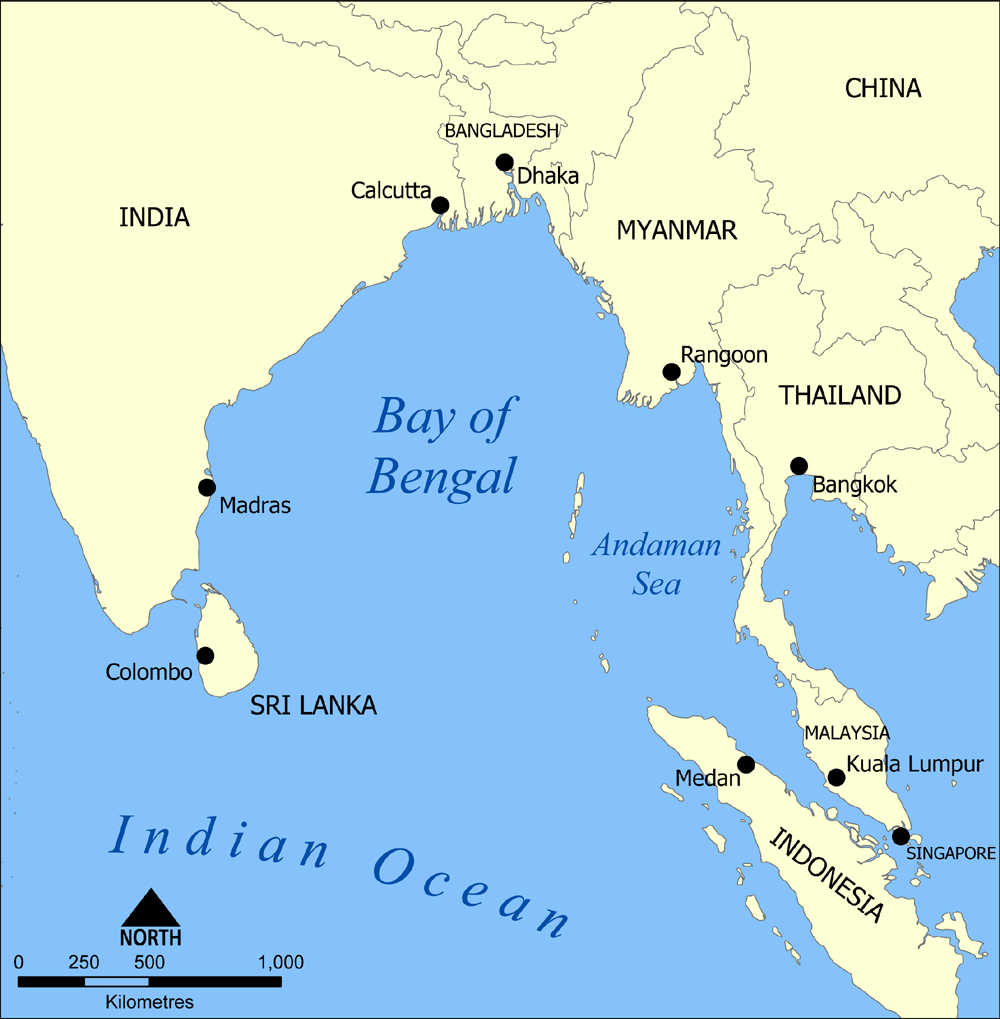
Bay of Bengal

This rapid transmission of the pathogen around the globe in the 20th century can be attributed chiefly to the major hub, the Bay of Bengal, from where the disease spread.

In the 2020s, global cholera cases rose sharply after decades of decline, driven by persistent poverty, conflict, and worsening climate change. By 2024, outbreaks had spread to sixty countries—mostly in Africa, the Middle East, and Asia—straining international response efforts and depleting vaccine supplies. As of 31 August 2025, 462,890 cases and 5,869 deaths had been reported from 32 countries across five WHO regions.

Cholera is caused by eating food or drinking water that is contaminated with the bacteria V. cholerae. It affects both children and adults, causing severe watery diarrhea with dehydration. But, as noted, the El Tor strain has persisted for decades to the present, causing repeated epidemics in varied locations, with 570,000 cases in 1991 alone. WHO and other authorities believe that the seventh pandemic continues.

== Introduction ==
Cholera is an acute diarrhoeal infection caused by the ingestion of food or water contaminated with the bacterium Vibrio cholerae. Most commonly the contamination of food or water occurs via faecal matter, and the infection is spread through the faecal-oral route. Cholera has also been found to be caused by eating raw shellfish. Symptoms of the disease appear between 12 hours and 5 days of infection; however, only 10% of infected people show severe symptoms of watery diarrhoea, vomiting and leg cramps. Cholera is diagnosed through a stool test or rectal swab, and today treatment takes the form of an oral rehydration solution (ORS). The ORS uses equimolar concentrations of sodium and glucose to maximise sodium uptake in the small intestine, and carefully replaces fluid losses. In severe cases, the rapid loss of bodily fluids leads to dehydration and patients are at risk of shock. This requires administration of intravenous fluids and antibiotics.

The transmission of cholera is closely linked to inadequate access to clean water and sanitation facilities and hence, people at risk largely live in slums and poor communities.

== Epidemiology ==
The 7th pandemic is traced to early 1961 and is ongoing. The evolution of the classical cholera strain known from the first six pandemics was revealed through genetic analysis. The first observation of the new lineage came from a laboratory in El Tor, Egypt, in 1897. By this time, the 'El Tor' strain differed from its relatives by 30%. It originated in South-Asia, then transitioned to its non-pathogenic form in the Middle East in 1900. Sometime between 1903 and 1908, the El Tor strain picked up DNA that triggered its ability to cause disease in humans. Hence, it had mutated into the El Tor pandemic strain. Makassar, South Sulawesi was the source of a 1960 outbreak of the El Tor strain, where it gained new genes that likely increased transmissibility. Cholera spread overseas in 1961, indicating a pandemic strain.

Many studies point to Indonesia as the source of the seventh cholera pandemic; however, research has indicated that outbreaks in China between 1960 and 1990 were associated with the same sub-lineages. These strains spread globally from the Bay of Bengal on multiple occasions. China has been classified as both a sink and source during the pandemic spread of cholera throughout the 1960s and 1970s. The suggestion that the pandemic spread of cholera may have been augmented by Chinese cases, in addition to China being identified as an origin for bordering countries, contrasts with the view that the pandemic began in Indonesia.

During the 2020s, after decades of decline, cholera cases began to rise again, including in countries that had not recorded outbreaks for many years. The traditional drivers of cholera, such as poverty, inadequate sanitation, and conflict, persisted, while climate change and ongoing wars further worsened conditions. Extreme weather events such as floods, cyclones, and droughts reduced access to safe water and created favourable conditions for the disease to spread. By 2024, 60 countries had reported cholera cases, up from 45 in 2023. Most infections occurred in Africa, the Middle East, and Asia, which together accounted for 98% of global cases. These trends continued into 2025, placing heavy pressure on international response efforts and causing shortages of essential supplies, including vaccines. As of 31 August 2025, 462,890 cases and 5,869 deaths had been reported from 32 countries across five WHO regions.

== Spread and mortality ==
The El Tor cholera outbreak was first reported in Java, a seaside community near Kendal which was visited by travellers from Makassar in May 1961. Shortly after, Semarang and Djakarta became infected in June.

The disease was carried into Kuching, Sarawak when boats from Celebes participated in a regatta in Kuching; the first cholera cases appeared on 1 July. This outbreak lasted two weeks, infecting 582 persons with 79 deaths (17% mortality). By August, the outbreak had reached Kalimantan and Macau (13 patients and six deaths). The first case in Hong Kong appeared on 15 August in a community near Kwangtung, a fishing area. The second case was from a boat-dwelling population located between Kwangtung and Hong Kong. Hong Kong had 72 cases with 15 deaths (20.8% mortality).

By February 1, 1962, 4,107 people were infected with cholera, with 897 deaths (21.8% mortality). By September, despite a massive vaccination campaign, cholera had rapidly moved through the Philippines, where the number of infected people reached 15,000 by March 1962, with 2,005 deaths. In the Philippines alone, mortality reached 1,682 in 1962. It was reintroduced into British Borneo, supposedly by an asymptomatic traveller from Jolo Island. Outbreaks subsequently occurred in Cambodia, Thailand, Singapore and India.

In 1963, WHO declared that cholera remained the number-one killer in diseases subject to international quarantine, having been reported in Taiwan, Pakistan, Afghanistan, Iran, Southern Russia, Iraq, Korea, Burma, Cambodia, South Vietnam, Malaysia, Singapore, Nepal, Thailand, Uzbekistan and Hong Kong.

The mid-60s saw cholera infiltrate Southeast Asia, with outbreaks in Chittagong, Bangladesh, Cambodia, Thailand and Malaysia, and India in 1964. The El Tor strain moved further westward, invading South Asia in 1965, including Pakistan, Nepal, Afghanistan, Iran and part of Uzbek SSR. Iran, which had been free from cholera since 1939, reported 2,704 cases by mid-October. When these outbreaks occurred in Iran, the Pasteur Institute of Iran produced 9.5 million cholera vaccines to protect the population of the eastern regions of Iran. In 1966 Iraq reported its first case.

The cholera strain reached the Middle East and Africa in 1970 and spread rapidly. It is thought that a traveler returning from Asia or the Middle East introduced the disease into Africa. The Arabian Peninsula, Syria and Jordan became infected, followed by Guinea in August 1970. Cholera was first thought to have spread along waterways along the coast and into the interior along the rivers.

Coinciding with the commencement of Ramadan in November 1970, infected individuals seemed to travel by modernised rapid transport. This allowed cholera to extend 1,000 km, when it appeared in Mopti, Mali. Subsequently, customary large gatherings of people facilitated the outward radiation of cholera. From 1970 to 1971, Sierra Leone, Liberia, Côte d'Ivoire, Ghana, Togo, Benin, Nigeria and southern Cameroon, experienced outbreaks. The west-African outbreak of cholera during 1970–1971 infected more than 400,000 persons. Africa had a high cholera fatality rate of 16% by 1962. 25 countries were infected by the end of 1971 and, between 1972 and 1991, cholera spread throughout much of the remainder of Africa.

== Research ==
An international campaign began in 1970, including the research laboratory in Dhaka, Bangladesh; the Southeast Asia Treaty Organisation (SEATO), the United Kingdom, Australia, and various American agencies. Human volunteers took part in an NIH-sponsored series of tests to develop an effective cholera vaccine. At this time, new outbreaks of cholera were occurring in Egypt, South Korea, and the Soviet Union.

The use of oral rehydration solution to treat cholera was endorsed by WHO in the 1980s. This practice of replacing fluids and electrolytes is estimated to have saved the lives of 40 million individuals infected with cholera. As a result of the success of ORS treatment, the past 30 years have seen changes to cholera response that centred on treating affected individuals in the short term, and attempting to provide safe water and improved hygiene in the long term.

The cholera pandemic beginning in 1962 is identified through the 'El Tor' biotype, and considerable research has been undertaken into this specific strain of cholera. The El Tor biotype has been demonstrated to have increased resistance to the environment. This has heightened the risk of unknowing transmission from asymptomatic carriage in humans, as opposed to the classical biotype that caused the first six cholera pandemics.

Previously, health workers who were against the administration of the cholera vaccine based their opinion on the view that always limited resources should be directed at immediate rehydration and improved practices, and longer-term investment to provide safe water and improved sanitation. Such practices as appropriately cooking food before consumption, using sterilised water, following general personal hygiene, and sanitising environments, decrease the spread of cholera. In the 21st century, cholera control activities have typically still been focused on emergency responses to outbreaks, with limited attention to the underlying causes that can prevent recurrence.

But, the development of new and improved cholera vaccines has allowed this practice of emergency responses to be revised. In addition, recent research has advanced understanding of cholera, its transmission and the immune response. Subsequently, these advances have resulted in the development of experimental cholera vaccines derived from non-living and attenuated live strains. By 2017 the FDA had approved a single-dose, live, oral cholera vaccine called Vaxchora for adults aged 18–64 who are travelling to an area of active cholera transmission. A study in Haiti has shown lasting protection from a two-dose cholera vaccine. During the 2010–2017 cholera outbreak in Haiti, those who received the two doses of the vaccine were 76% less likely to become sick. This protection lasted 4 years.

The clinical severity of the El Tor biotype causing pandemic cholera in 1962 also resulted in modern research assessing administration of antimicrobials in the initial phase of an outbreak. This was tested in the 1970s with tetracycline but was found not to be useful due to resistance against this antibiotic. Questions have been raised alluding to newer drugs, and whether the administration of these will be more useful than such previous attempts.

The ongoing seventh pandemic has affirmed that cholera is still prevalent in society and can cause high mortality. In 1992 the Global Task Force on Cholera Control (GTFCC) was organized to coordinate activities and support countries after a severe cholera outbreak in Peru. Today it consists of more than 30 collaborating institutions, including NGOs, academic institutions, and UN agencies supporting affected countries. In 2017 they convened a high-level meeting with officials from cholera-affected countries, donors, and technical partners to announce their strategy "The Global Roadmap to 2030", an initiative to end cholera as a threat to public health by 2030. The three components of the strategy are: "early detection and quick response to contain the outbreaks; a multi-sectorial {sic} approach to prevent cholera recurrence, and, coordination of technical support and advocacy, resource mobilisation and partnership at the global level.
