= 1899–1923 cholera pandemic =

Global pandemic

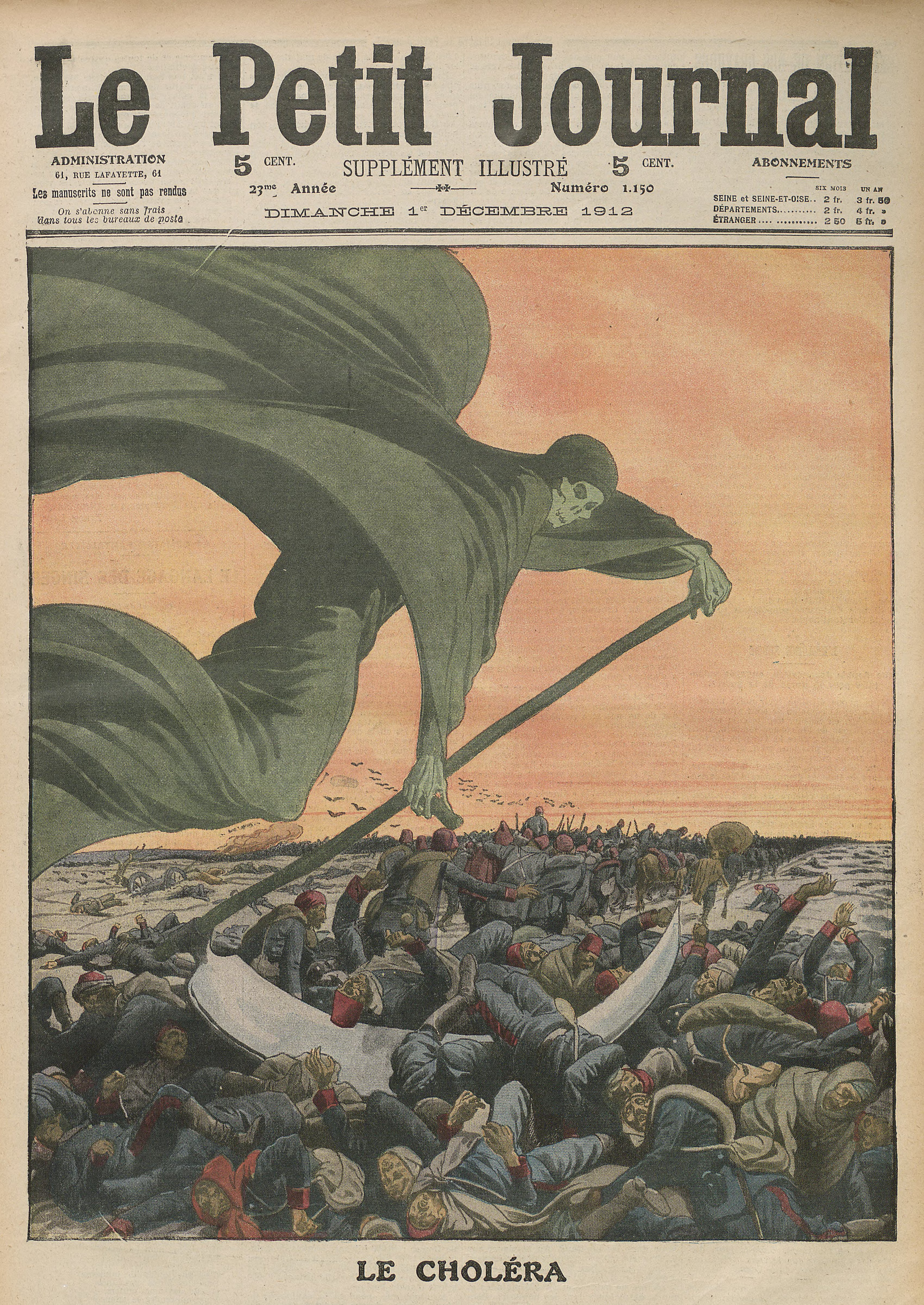
Drawing of Death bringing the cholera, in Le Petit Journal (1912).

The sixth cholera pandemic (1899–1923) was a major outbreak of cholera beginning in India, where it killed more than 800,000 people, and spreading to West Asia, North Africa, Eastern Europe, and Russia.

The outbreak of the pandemic is thought to have started at the Haridwar Kumbh Mela. The epidemic spread to Europe via Punjab, Afghanistan, Persia, and southern Russia. An outbreak of cholera in New York City from 1910 to 1911 is thought to be part of the pandemic, having spread through infected people aboard the steamship Moltke which was transporting passengers from Naples. In 1913, there was a cholera outbreak in forces of the Romanian Army which were taking part in military operations of the Second Balkan War in Bulgarian areas.

== History ==
According to Leonard Rogers, following an outbreak of cholera at the Haridwar Kumbh Mela, the epidemic spread to Europe via Punjab, Afghanistan, Persia, and southern Russia.

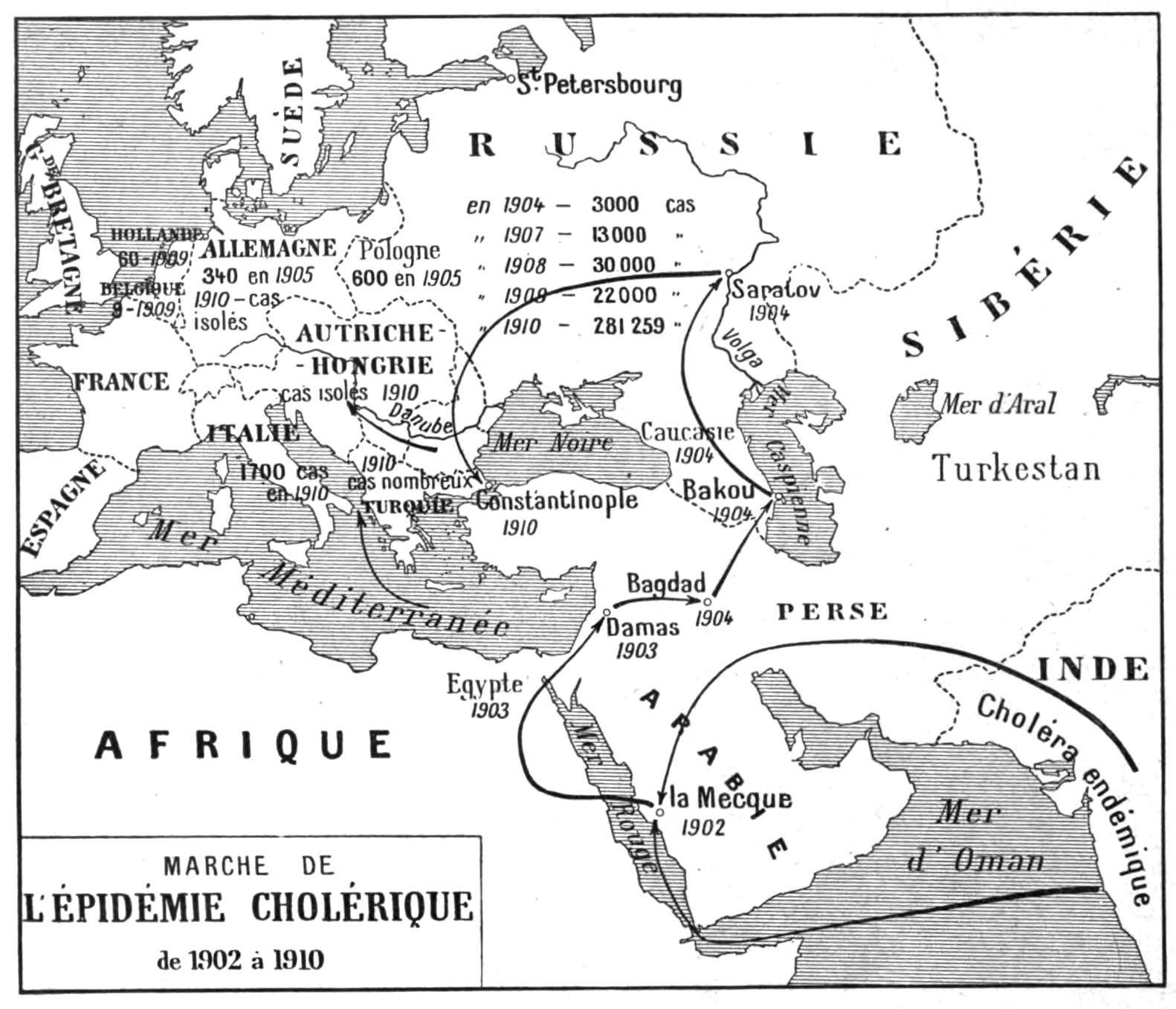
French map (published in 1911) showing the progress of the cholera epidemic from 1902 to 1910.

The last cholera outbreak in the United States was in 1910–1911 when the steamship Moltke brought infected people to New York City from Naples. Vigilant health authorities isolated the infected on Swinburne Island, built in the nineteenth century as a quarantine facility. Eleven people died, including a health care worker at the island hospital.

In 1913, the Romanian Army, while invading Bulgaria during the Second Balkan War, suffered a cholera outbreak that provoked 1,600 deaths.

== See also ==
- Cholera outbreaks and pandemics
