= Cholera =

Bacterial infection of the small intestine

- Other names: Asiatic cholera, epidemic cholera
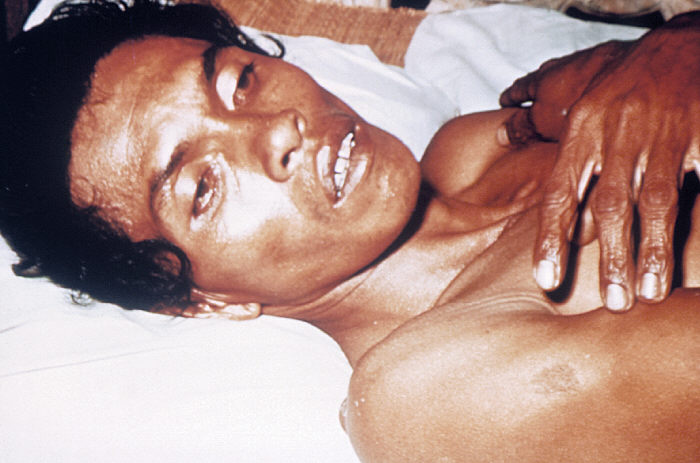
- A person with severe dehydration due to cholera, causing sunken eyes and wrinkled hands and skin
- Specialty: Infectious disease
- Symptoms: Large amounts of watery diarrhea, vomiting, muscle cramps
- Complications: Dehydration, electrolyte imbalance
- Usual onset: 2 hours to 5 days after exposure
- Duration: A few days
- Causes: Vibrio cholerae spread by fecal–oral route
- Risk factors: Poor sanitation, lack of clean water, poverty
- Diagnostic method: Stool test
- Prevention: Improved sanitation, clean water, hand washing, cholera vaccines
- Treatment: Oral rehydration therapy, zinc supplementation, intravenous fluids, antibiotics
- Prognosis: Less than 1% mortality rate with proper treatment, untreated mortality rate 50–60%
- Frequency: 3–5 million people a year
- Deaths: 7074 (2025)

Cholera (/ˈkɒlərə/) is an infection of the small intestine by some strains of the bacterium Vibrio cholerae. Symptoms may range from none, to mild, to severe. The classic symptom is large amounts of watery diarrhea lasting a few days. Vomiting and muscle cramps may also occur. Diarrhea can be so severe that it leads within hours to severe dehydration and electrolyte imbalance. This can in turn result in sunken eyes, cold or cyanotic skin, decreased skin elasticity, wrinkling of the hands and feet, and, in severe cases, death. Symptoms start two hours to five days after exposure.

Cholera is caused by a number of types of Vibrio cholerae, with some types producing more severe disease than others. It is spread mostly by unsafe water and unsafe food that has been contaminated with human feces containing the bacteria. Undercooked shellfish is a common source. Humans are the only known host for the bacteria. Risk factors for the disease include poor sanitation, insufficient clean drinking water, and poverty. Cholera can be diagnosed by a stool test, or a rapid dipstick test, although the dipstick test is less accurate.

Prevention methods against cholera include improved sanitation and access to clean water. Cholera vaccines that are given by mouth provide reasonable protection for about six months, and confer the added benefit of protecting against another type of diarrhea caused by E. coli. In 2017, the US Food and Drug Administration (FDA) approved a single-dose, live, oral cholera vaccine called Vaxchora for adults aged 18–64 who are travelling to an area of active cholera transmission. It offers limited protection to young children. People who survive an episode of cholera have long-lasting immunity for at least three years (the period tested).

The primary treatment for affected individuals is oral rehydration salts (ORS), the replacement of fluids and electrolytes by using slightly sweet and salty solutions. Rice-based solutions are preferred. In children, zinc supplementation has also been found to improve outcomes. In severe cases, intravenous fluids, such as Ringer's lactate, may be required, and antibiotics may be beneficial. The choice of antibiotic is aided by antibiotic sensitivity testing.

Cholera continues to affect an estimated 3–5 million people worldwide and causes 28,800–130,000 deaths a year. To date, seven cholera pandemics have occurred, with the most recent beginning in 1961, and continuing today. The illness is rare in high-income countries, and affects children most severely. Cholera occurs as both outbreaks and chronically in certain areas. Areas with an ongoing risk of disease include Africa and Southeast Asia. The risk of death among those affected is usually less than 5%, given improved treatment, but may be as high as 50% without such access to treatment. Descriptions of cholera are found as early as the 5th century BCE in Sanskrit literature. In Europe, cholera was a term initially used to describe any kind of gastroenteritis, and was not used for this disease until the early 19th century. The study of cholera in England by John Snow between 1849 and 1854 led to significant advances in the field of epidemiology because of his insights about transmission via contaminated water, and a map of the same was the first recorded incidence of epidemiological tracking.

Video summary with VideoWiki (script)

== Signs and symptoms ==
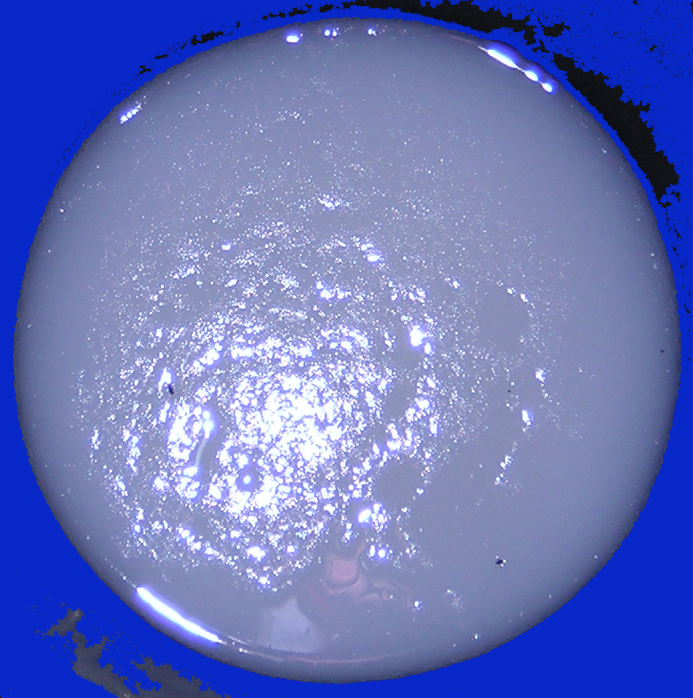
Typical cholera diarrhea that looks like "rice water"

The primary symptoms of cholera are profuse diarrhea and vomiting of clear fluid. These symptoms usually start suddenly, half a day to five days after ingestion of the bacteria. The diarrhea is frequently described as "rice water" in nature and may have a fishy odor. An untreated person with cholera may produce 10 to 20 litres (3 to 5 US gal) of diarrhea a day. Severe cholera, without treatment, kills about half of affected individuals. If the severe diarrhea is not treated, it can result in life-threatening dehydration and electrolyte imbalances. Estimates of the ratio of asymptomatic to symptomatic infections have ranged from 3 to 100. Cholera has been nicknamed the "blue death" because a person's skin may turn bluish-gray from extreme loss of fluids.

Fever is rare and should raise suspicion for secondary infection. Patients can be lethargic and might have sunken eyes, dry mouth, cold clammy skin, or wrinkled hands and feet. Kussmaul breathing, a deep and labored breathing pattern, can occur because of acidosis from stool bicarbonate losses and lactic acidosis associated with poor perfusion. Blood pressure drops due to dehydration, peripheral pulse is rapid and thready, and urine output decreases with time. Muscle cramping and weakness, altered consciousness, seizures, or even coma due to electrolyte imbalances are common, especially in children.

== Cause ==
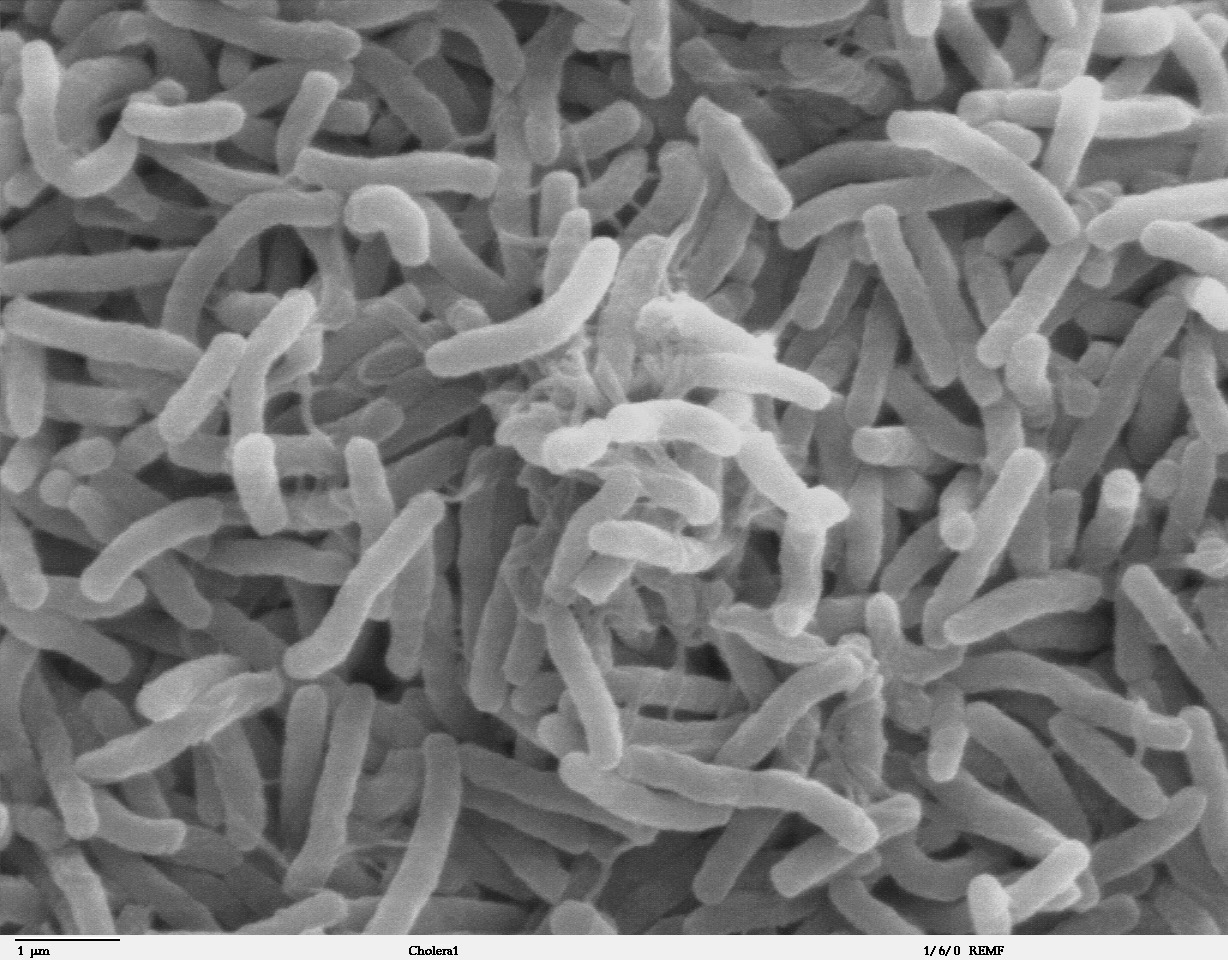
Scanning electron microscope image of Vibrio cholerae

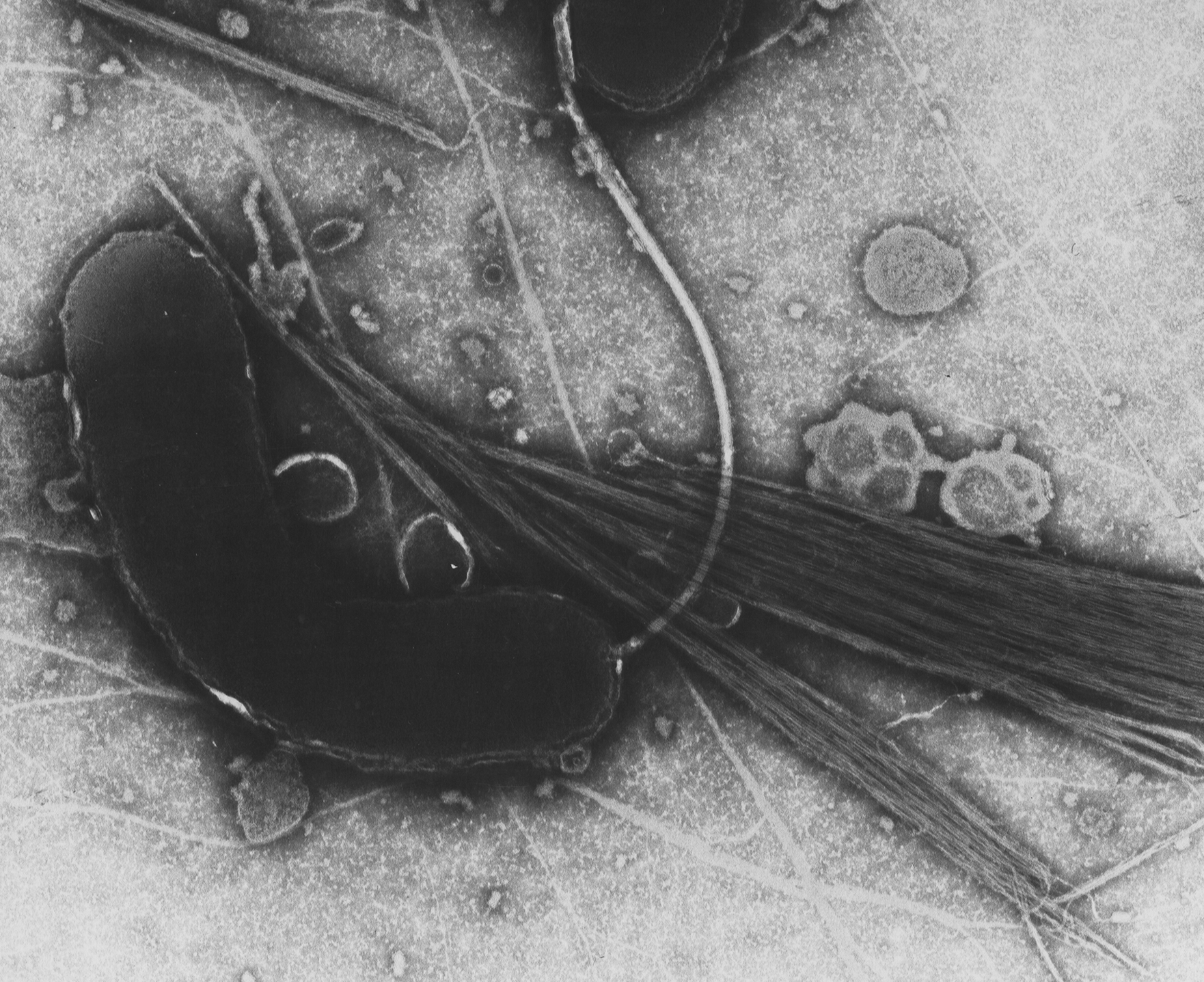
Vibrio cholerae, the bacterium that causes cholera

=== Transmission ===
Transmission is usually through the fecal-oral route of contaminated food or water caused by poor sanitation. Most cholera cases in developed countries are a result of transmission by food, while in developing countries it is more often water. Cholera bacteria have been found in shellfish and plankton. Food transmission can occur when people harvest seafood such as oysters in waters infected with sewage, as Vibrio cholerae accumulates in planktonic crustaceans and the oysters eat the zooplankton. Cholera outbreaks are increasing in occurrence, distribution and intensity due to climate change.

People infected with cholera often have diarrhea, and disease transmission may occur if this highly liquid stool, colloquially referred to as "rice-water", contaminates water used by others. A single diarrheal event can cause a millionfold increase in numbers of V. cholerae in the environment. The source of the contamination is typically other people with cholera when their untreated diarrheal discharge is allowed to get into waterways, groundwater, or drinking water supplies. Drinking any contaminated water and eating any foods washed in the water, as well as shellfish living in the affected waterway, can cause a person to contract an infection. Cholera is rarely spread directly from person to person. (Note: According to CDC,"The infection [cholera] is not likely to spread directly from one person to another; therefore, casual contact with an infected person is not a risk factor for becoming ill.")

V. cholerae also exists outside the human body in natural water sources, either by itself or through interacting with phytoplankton, zooplankton, or biotic and abiotic detritus. Drinking such water can also result in the disease, even without prior contamination through fecal matter. However, selective pressures exist in the aquatic environment that may reduce the virulence of V. cholerae. Specifically, animal models indicate that the transcriptional profile of the pathogen changes as it prepares to enter an aquatic environment. This transcriptional change results in a loss of ability of V. cholerae to be cultured on standard media, a phenotype referred to as 'viable but non-culturable' (VBNC) or more conservatively 'active but non-culturable' (ABNC). One study indicates that the culturability of V. cholerae drops 90% within 24 hours of entering the water, and furthermore that this loss in culturability is associated with a loss in virulence.

Both toxic and non-toxic strains exist. Non-toxic strains can acquire toxicity through a temperate bacteriophage.

=== Susceptibility ===
About 100 million bacteria must typically be ingested to cause cholera in a normal healthy adult. This dose, however, is less in those with lowered gastric acidity (for instance those using proton pump inhibitors). Children are also more susceptible, with two- to four-year-olds having the highest rates of infection. Individuals' susceptibility to cholera is also affected by their blood type, with those with type O blood being the most susceptible. Persons with lowered immunity, such as persons with AIDS or malnourished children, are more likely to develop a severe case if they become infected. Any individual, even a healthy adult in middle age, can undergo a severe case, and each person's case should be measured by the loss of fluids, preferably in consultation with a professional health care provider.

The cystic fibrosis genetic mutation known as delta-F508 in humans has been said to maintain a selective heterozygous advantage: heterozygous carriers of the mutation (who are not affected by cystic fibrosis) are more resistant to V. cholerae infections. In this model, the genetic deficiency in the cystic fibrosis transmembrane conductance regulator channel proteins interferes with bacteria binding to the intestinal epithelium, thus reducing the effects of an infection.

== Mechanism ==
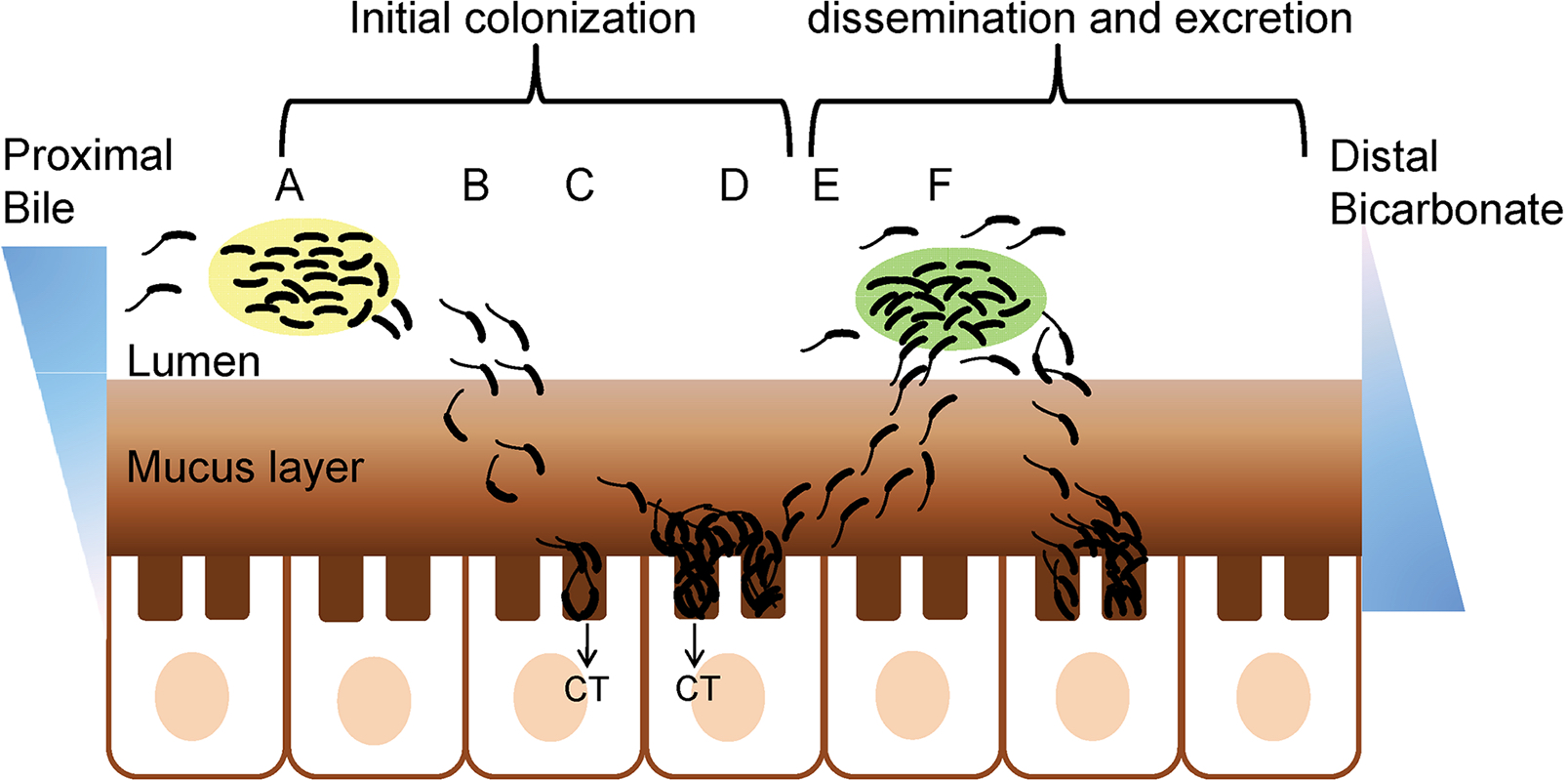
The role of biofilm in the intestinal colonization of Vibrio cholerae

When consumed, most bacteria do not survive the acidic conditions of the human stomach. The few surviving bacteria conserve their energy and stored nutrients during the passage through the stomach by shutting down protein production. When the surviving bacteria exit the stomach and reach the small intestine, they must propel themselves through the thick mucus that lines the small intestine to reach the intestinal walls where they can attach and thrive.

Once the cholera bacteria reach the intestinal wall, they no longer need the flagella to move. The bacteria stop producing the protein flagellin to conserve energy and nutrients by changing the mix of proteins that they express in response to the changed chemical surroundings. On reaching the intestinal wall, V. cholerae start producing the toxic proteins that give the infected person a watery diarrhea. This carries the multiplying new generations of V. cholerae bacteria out into the drinking water of the next host if proper sanitation measures are not in place.

The cholera toxin (CTX or CT) is an oligomeric complex made up of six protein subunits: a single copy of the A subunit (part A), and five copies of the B subunit (part B), connected by a disulfide bond. The five B subunits form a five-membered ring that binds to GM1 gangliosides on the surface of the intestinal epithelium cells. The A1 portion of the A subunit is an enzyme that ADP-ribosylates G proteins, while the A2 chain fits into the central pore of the B subunit ring. Upon binding, the complex is taken into the cell via receptor-mediated endocytosis. Once inside the cell, the disulfide bond is reduced, and the A1 subunit is freed to bind with a human partner protein called ADP-ribosylation factor 6 (Arf6). Binding exposes its active site, allowing it to permanently ribosylate the Gs alpha subunit of the heterotrimeric G protein. This results in constitutive cAMP production, which in turn leads to the secretion of water, sodium, potassium, and bicarbonate into the lumen of the small intestine and rapid dehydration. The gene encoding the cholera toxin was introduced into V. cholerae by horizontal gene transfer. Virulent strains of V. cholerae carry a variant of a temperate bacteriophage called CTXφ.

Microbiologists have studied the genetic mechanisms by which the V. cholerae bacteria turn off the production of some proteins and turn on the production of other proteins as they respond to the series of chemical environments they encounter, passing through the stomach, through the mucous layer of the small intestine, and on to the intestinal wall. Of particular interest have been the genetic mechanisms by which cholera bacteria turn on the protein production of the toxins that interact with host cell mechanisms to pump chloride ions into the small intestine, creating an ionic pressure which prevents sodium ions from entering the cell. The chloride and sodium ions create a salt-water environment in the small intestines, which through osmosis can pull up to six liters of water per day through the intestinal cells, creating the massive amounts of diarrhea. The host can become rapidly dehydrated unless treated properly.

By inserting separate, successive sections of V. cholerae DNA into the DNA of other bacteria, such as E. coli that would not naturally produce the protein toxins, researchers have investigated the mechanisms by which V. cholerae responds to the changing chemical environments of the stomach, mucous layers, and intestinal wall. Researchers have discovered a complex cascade of regulatory proteins controls expression of V. cholerae virulence determinants. In responding to the chemical environment at the intestinal wall, the V. cholerae bacteria produce the TcpP/TcpH proteins, which, together with the ToxR/ToxS proteins, activate the expression of the ToxT regulatory protein. ToxT then directly activates expression of virulence genes that produce the toxins, causing diarrhea in the infected person and allowing the bacteria to colonize the intestine. Current research aims at discovering "the signal that makes the cholera bacteria stop swimming and start to colonize (that is, adhere to the cells of) the small intestine."

=== Genetic structure ===
Amplified fragment length polymorphism fingerprinting of the pandemic isolates of V. cholerae has revealed variation in the genetic structure. Two clusters have been identified: Cluster I and Cluster II. For the most part, Cluster I consists of strains from the 1960s and 1970s, while Cluster II largely contains strains from the 1980s and 1990s, based on the change in the clone structure. This grouping of strains is best seen in the strains from the African continent.

=== Antibiotic resistance ===
In many areas of the world, antibiotic resistance is increasing within cholera bacteria. In Bangladesh, for example, most cases are resistant to tetracycline, trimethoprim-sulfamethoxazole, and erythromycin. Rapid diagnostic assay methods are available for the identification of multi-drug resistant cases. New generation antimicrobials have been discovered which are effective against cholera bacteria in in vitro studies.

== Diagnosis ==
A rapid dipstick test is available to determine the presence of V. cholerae. In those samples that test positive, further testing should be done to determine antibiotic resistance. In epidemic situations, a clinical diagnosis may be made by taking a patient history and doing a brief examination. Treatment via hydration and over-the-counter hydration solutions can be started without or before confirmation by laboratory analysis, especially where cholera is a common problem.

Stool and swab samples collected in the acute stage of the disease, before antibiotics have been administered, are the most useful specimens for laboratory diagnosis. If an epidemic of cholera is suspected, the most common causative agent is V. cholerae O1. If V. cholerae serogroup O1 is not isolated, the laboratory should test for V. cholerae O139. However, if neither of these organisms is isolated, it is necessary to send stool specimens to a reference laboratory.

Infection with V. cholerae O139 should be reported and handled in the same manner as that caused by V. cholerae O1. The associated diarrheal illness should be referred to as cholera and must be reported in the United States.

== Prevention ==
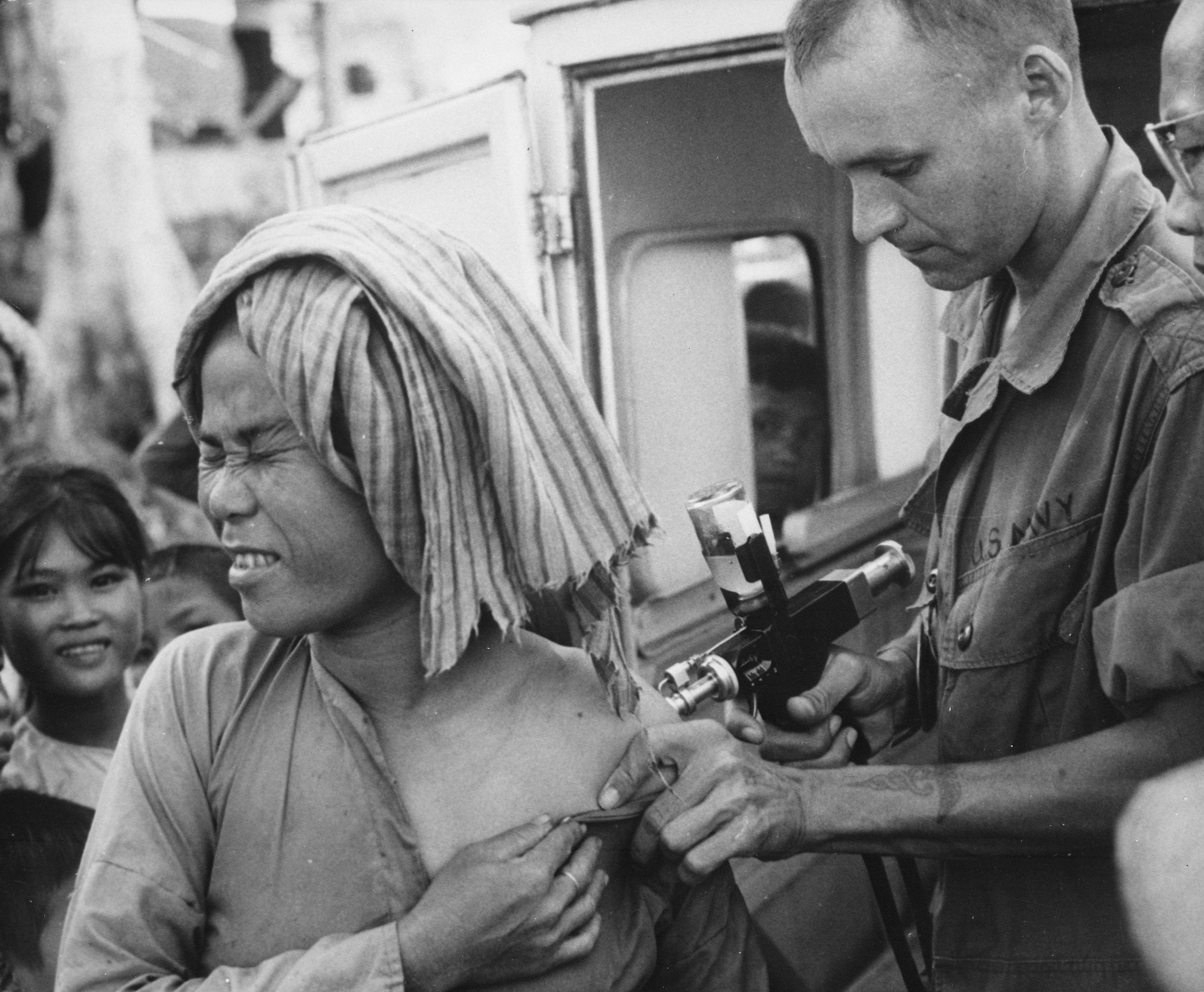
Preventive inoculation against cholera in 1966

The World Health Organization (WHO) recommends focusing on prevention, preparedness, and response to combat the spread of cholera. They also stress the importance of an effective surveillance system. Governments can play a role in all of these areas.

=== Water, sanitation and hygiene ===
Although cholera may be life-threatening, prevention of the disease is normally straightforward if proper sanitation practices are followed. In developed countries, due to their nearly universal advanced water treatment and sanitation practices, cholera is rare. For example, the last major outbreak of cholera in the United States occurred in 1910–1911. Cholera is mainly a risk in developing countries in those areas where access to WASH (water, sanitation and hygiene) infrastructure is still inadequate.

Effective sanitation practices, if instituted and adhered to in time, are usually sufficient to stop an epidemic. There are several points along the cholera transmission path at which its spread may be halted:

- Sterilization: Proper disposal and treatment of all materials that may have come into contact with the feces of other people with cholera (e.g., clothing, bedding, etc.) are essential. These should be sanitized by washing in hot water, using chlorine bleach if possible. Hands that touch cholera patients or their clothing, bedding, etc., should be thoroughly cleaned and disinfected with chlorinated water or other effective antimicrobial agents.
- Sewage and fecal sludge management: In cholera-affected areas, sewage and fecal sludge need to be treated and managed carefully in order to stop the spread of this disease via human excreta. Provision of sanitation and hygiene is an important preventative measure. Open defecation, release of untreated sewage, or dumping of fecal sludge from pit latrines or septic tanks into the environment need to be prevented. In many cholera affected zones, there is a low degree of sewage treatment. Therefore, the implementation of dry toilets that do not contribute to water pollution, as they do not flush with water, may be an interesting alternative to flush toilets.
- Sources: Warnings about possible cholera contamination should be posted around contaminated water sources with directions on how to decontaminate the water (boiling, chlorination etc.) for possible use.
- Water purification: All water used for drinking, washing, or cooking should be sterilized by either boiling, chlorination, ozone water treatment, ultraviolet light sterilization (e.g., by solar water disinfection), or antimicrobial filtration in any area where cholera may be present. Chlorination and boiling are often the least expensive and most effective means of halting transmission. Cloth filters or sari filtration, though very basic, have significantly reduced the occurrence of cholera when used in poor villages in Bangladesh that rely on untreated surface water. Better antimicrobial filters, like those present in advanced individual water treatment hiking kits, are most effective. Public health education and adherence to appropriate sanitation practices are of primary importance to help prevent and control transmission of cholera and other diseases.

Handwashing with soap or ash after using a toilet and before handling food or eating is also recommended for cholera prevention by WHO Africa.

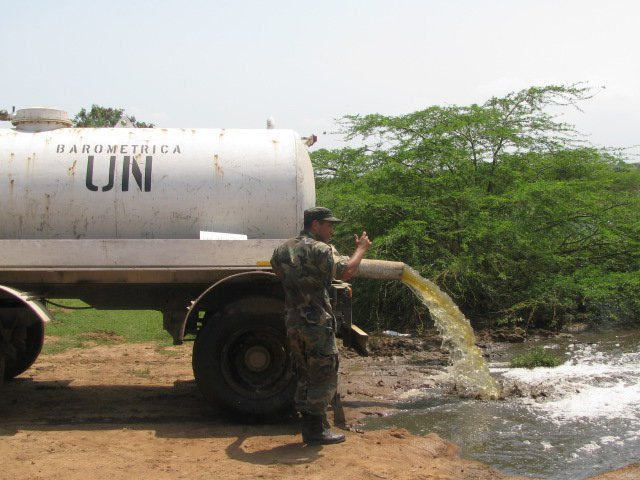
Dumping of sewage or fecal sludge from a UN camp into the Artibonite River is suspected to have started the spread of cholera after the Haiti earthquake in 2010, killing thousands.

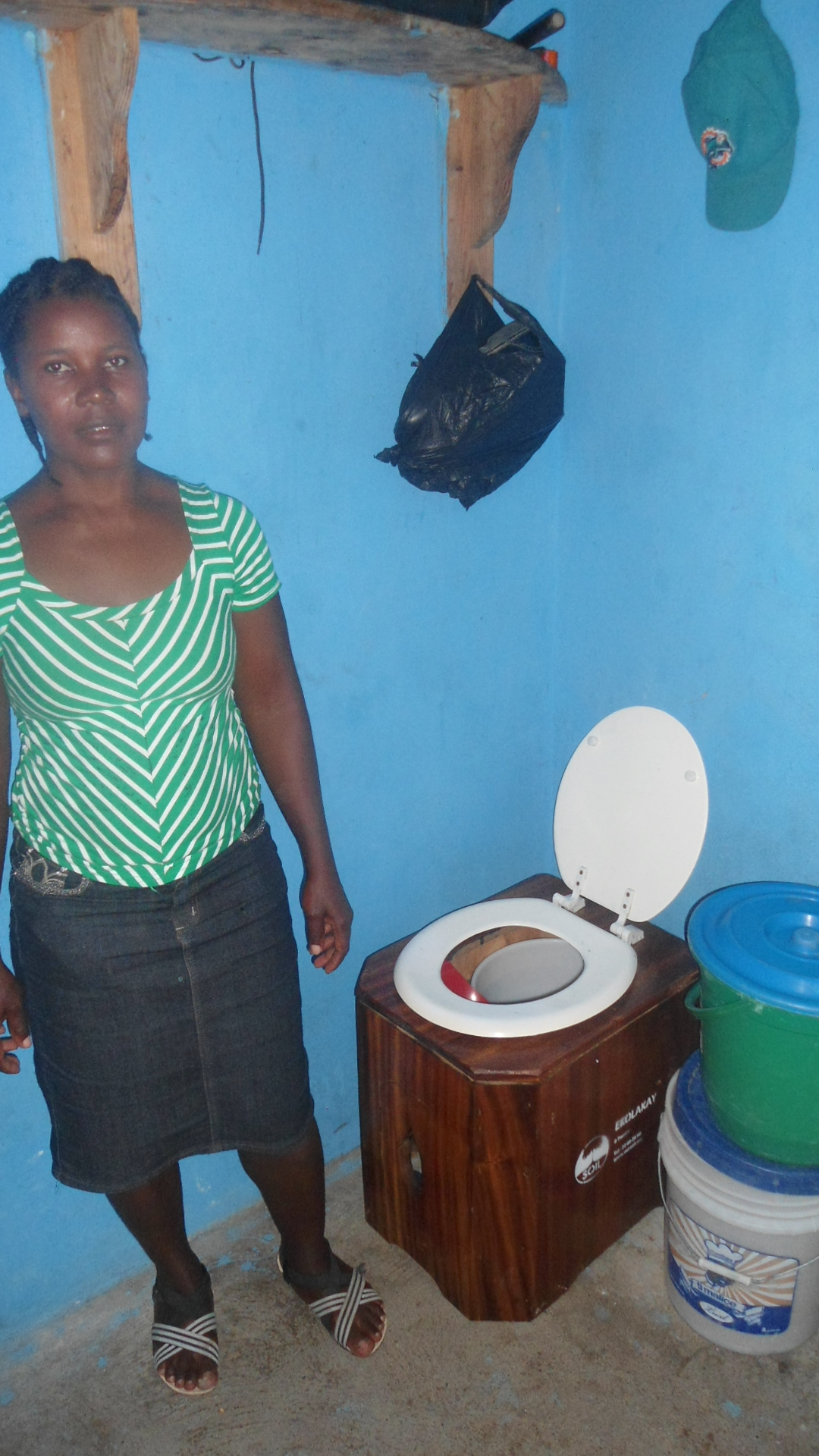
Example of a urine-diverting dry toilet in a cholera-affected area in Haiti. This type of toilet stops transmission of disease via the fecal-oral route due to water pollution.

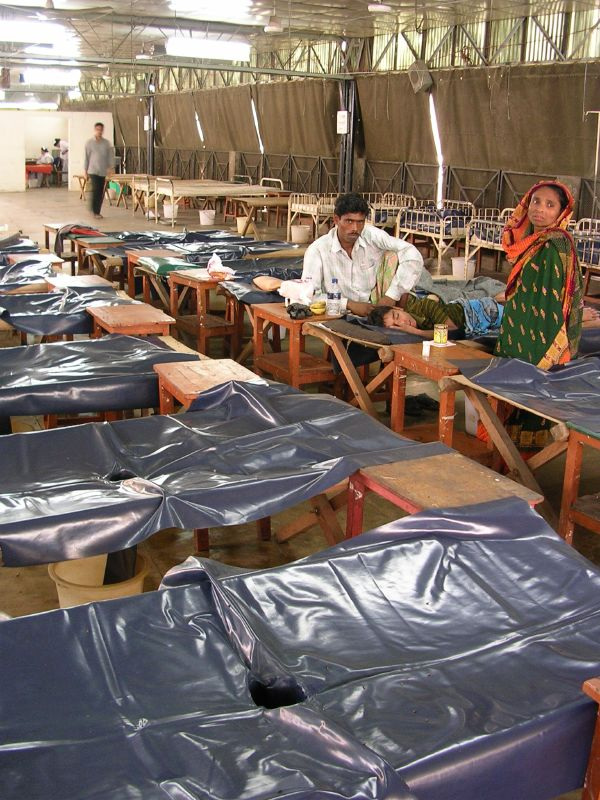
Cholera hospital in Dhaka, showing typical "cholera beds"

=== Surveillance ===
A modelling approach using satellite data can enhance our ability to develop cholera risk maps in several regions of the globe.

Surveillance and prompt reporting allow for containing cholera epidemics rapidly. Cholera exists as a seasonal disease in many endemic countries, occurring annually mostly during rainy seasons. Surveillance systems can provide early alerts to outbreaks, therefore leading to coordinated response and assist in preparation of preparedness plans. Efficient surveillance systems can also improve the risk assessment for potential cholera outbreaks. Understanding the seasonality and location of outbreaks provides guidance for improving cholera control activities for the most vulnerable. For prevention to be effective, it is important that cases be reported to national health authorities.

=== Vaccination ===
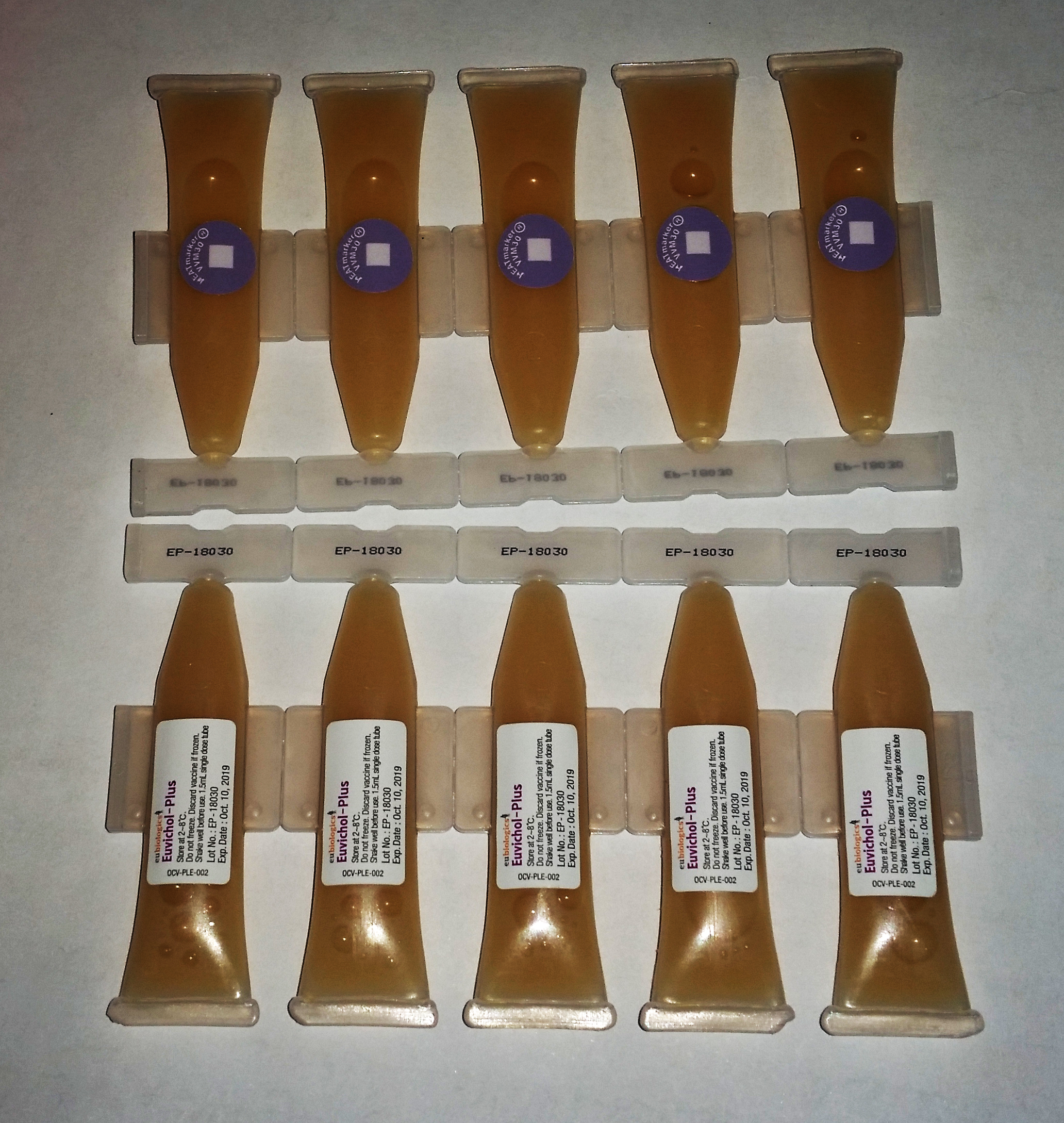
Euvichol-plus oral vaccine for cholera

Spanish physician Jaume Ferran i Clua developed the first successful cholera inoculation in 1885, the first to immunize humans against a bacterial disease. His vaccine and inoculation was rather controversial and was rejected by his peers and several investigation commissions but it ended up demonstrating its effectiveness and being recognized for it: out of the 30 thousand people he vaccinated only 54 died. Russian-French bacteriologist Waldemar Haffkine also developed a human cholera vaccine in July 1892. He conducted a massive inoculation program in British India.

Persons who survive an episode of cholera have long-lasting immunity for at least 3 years (the period tested). A number of safe and effective oral vaccines for cholera are available. The World Health Organization (WHO) has three prequalified oral cholera vaccines (OCVs): Dukoral, Sanchol, and Euvichol. Dukoral, an orally administered, inactivated whole-cell vaccine, has an overall efficacy of about 52% during the first year after being given and 62% in the second year, with minimal side effects. It is available in over 60 countries. However, it is not currently recommended by the Centers for Disease Control and Prevention (CDC) for most people traveling from the United States to endemic countries. The vaccine that the US Food and Drug Administration (FDA) recommends, Vaxchora, is an oral attenuated live vaccine, that is effective for adults aged 18–64 as a single dose.

One injectable vaccine was found to be effective for two to three years. The protective efficacy was 28% lower in children less than five years old. However, as of 2010, it has limited availability. Work is under way to investigate the role of mass vaccination. The WHO recommends immunization of high-risk groups, such as children and people with HIV, in countries where this disease is endemic. If people are immunized broadly, herd immunity results, with a decrease in the amount of contamination in the environment.

WHO recommends that oral cholera vaccination be considered in areas where the disease is endemic (with seasonal peaks), as part of the response to outbreaks, or in a humanitarian crisis during which the risk of cholera is high. OCV has been recognized as an adjunct tool for prevention and control of cholera. The WHO has prequalified three bivalent cholera vaccines—Dukoral (SBL Vaccines), containing a non-toxic B-subunit of cholera toxin and providing protection against V. cholerae O1; and two vaccines developed using the same transfer of technology—ShanChol (Shantha Biotec) and Euvichol (EuBiologics Co.), which have bivalent O1 and O139 oral killed cholera vaccines. Oral cholera vaccination could be deployed in a diverse range of situations from cholera-endemic areas and locations of humanitarian crises, but no clear consensus exists.

=== Sari filtration ===
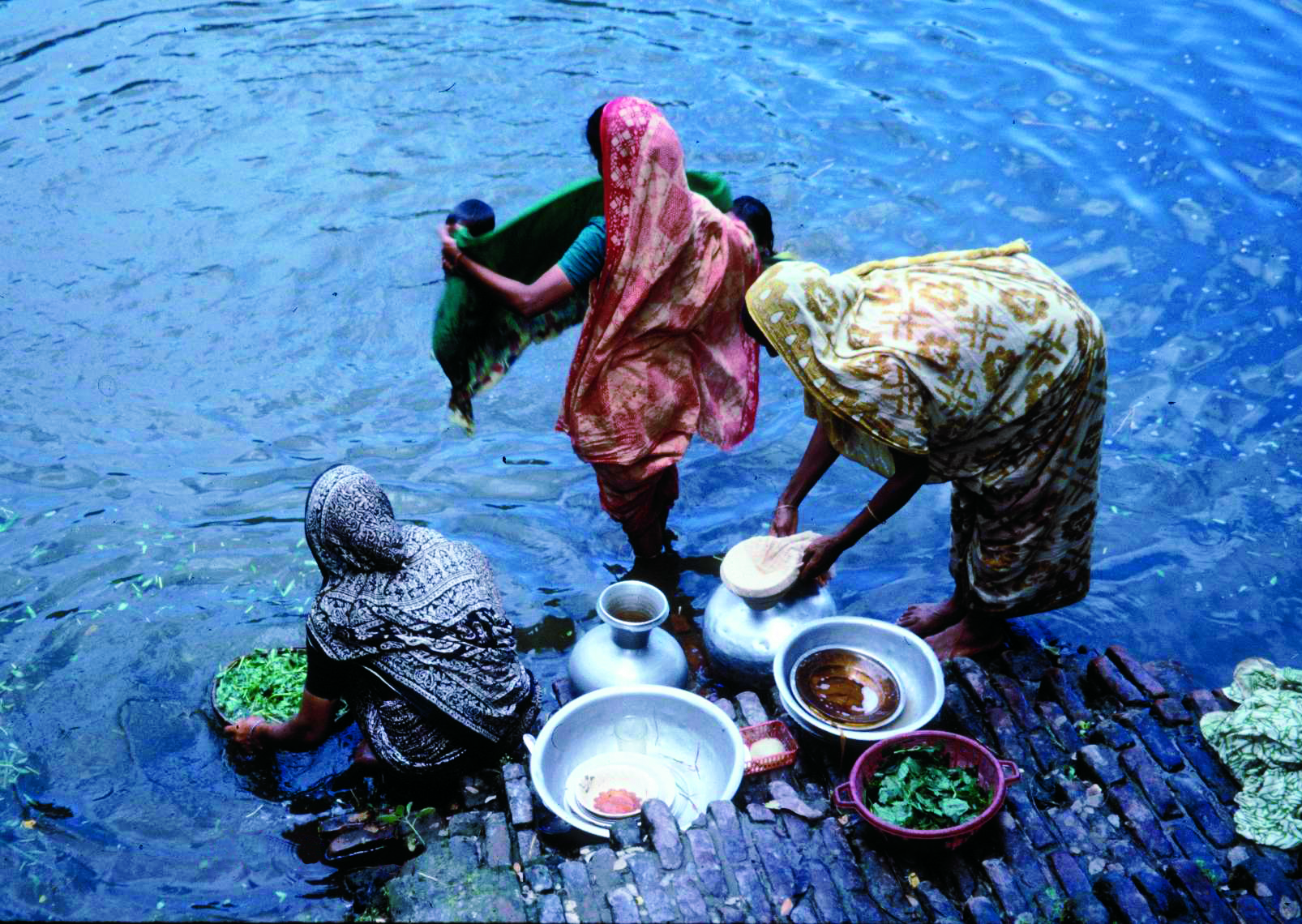
Women at a village pond in Matlab, Bangladesh, washing utensils and vegetables. The woman on the right is putting a sari filter onto a water-collecting pot (or kalash) to filter water for drinking.

Developed for use in Bangladesh, the "sari filter" is a simple and cost-effective appropriate technology method for reducing the contamination of drinking water. Used sari cloth is preferable but other types of used cloth can be used with some effect, though the effectiveness will vary significantly. Used cloth is more effective than new cloth, as the repeated washing reduces the space between the fibers. Water collected in this way has a greatly reduced pathogen count—though it will not necessarily be perfectly safe, it is an improvement for poor people with limited options. In Bangladesh this practice was found to decrease rates of cholera by nearly half. It involves folding a sari four to eight times. Between uses the cloth should be rinsed in clean water and dried in the sun to kill any bacteria on it. A nylon cloth appears to work as well but is not as affordable.

== Treatment ==
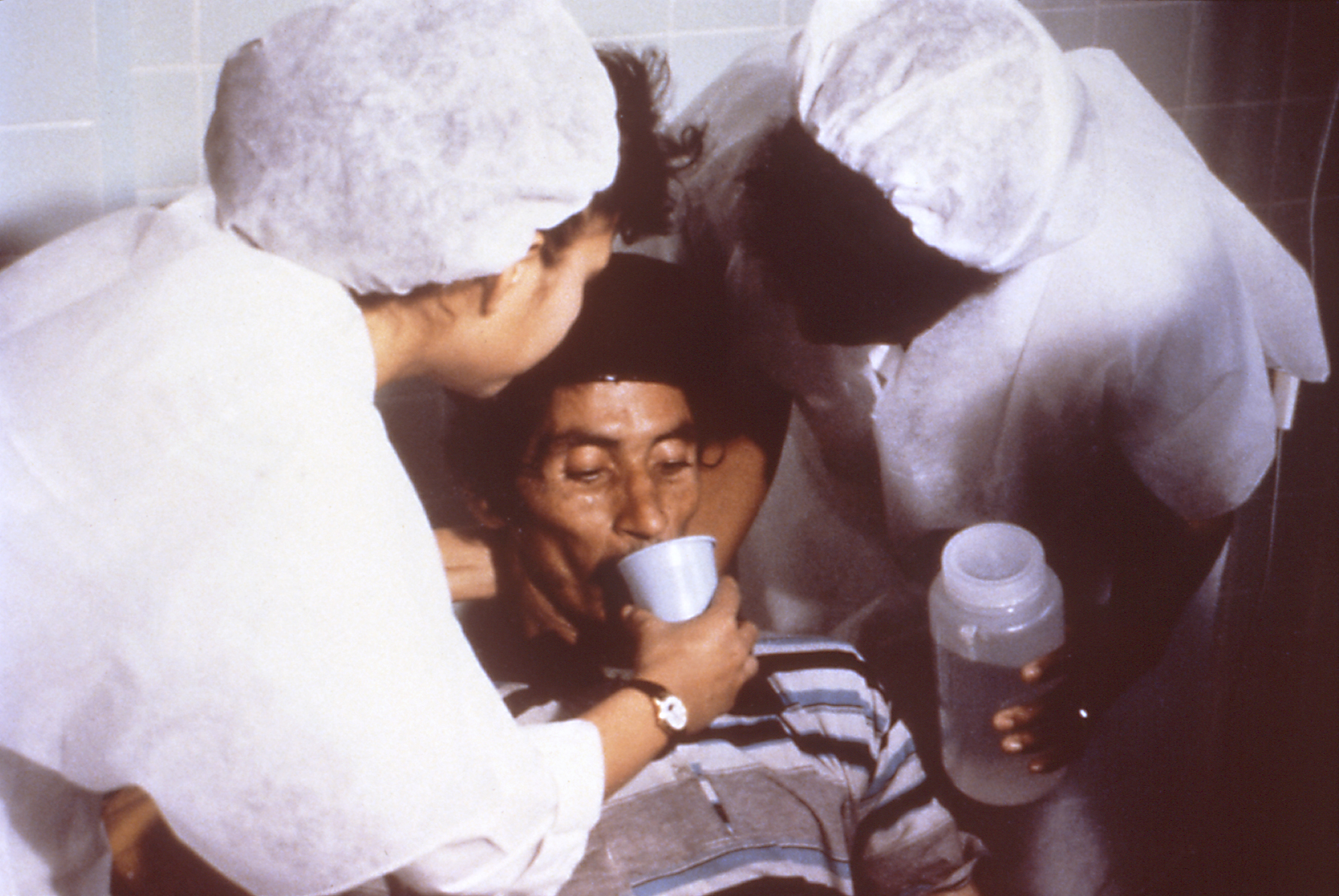
Cholera patient being treated by oral rehydration therapy in 1992

Continued eating speeds the recovery of normal intestinal function. The WHO recommends this generally for cases of diarrhea no matter what the underlying cause. A CDC training manual specifically for cholera states: "Continue to breastfeed your baby if the baby has watery diarrhea, even when traveling to get treatment. Adults and older children should continue to eat frequently."

=== Fluids ===
The most common error in caring for patients with cholera is to underestimate the speed and volume of fluids required. In most cases, cholera can be successfully treated with oral rehydration therapy (ORT), which is highly effective, safe, and simple to administer. Rice-based solutions are preferred to glucose-based ones due to greater efficiency. In severe cases with significant dehydration, intravenous rehydration may be necessary. Ringer's lactate is the preferred solution, often with added potassium. Large volumes and continued replacement until diarrhea has subsided may be needed. Ten percent of a person's body weight in fluid may need to be given in the first two to four hours. This method was first tried on a mass scale during the Bangladesh Liberation War, and was found to have much success. Despite widespread beliefs, fruit juices and commercial fizzy drinks like cola are not ideal for rehydration of people with serious infections of the intestines, and their excessive sugar content may even harm water uptake.

If commercially produced oral rehydration solutions are too expensive or difficult to obtain, solutions can be made. One such recipe calls for 1 liter of boiled water, 1/2 tsp (3 mL) of salt, 6 tsp (30 mL) of sugar, and added mashed banana for potassium and to improve taste.

=== Electrolytes ===
As there frequently is initially acidosis, the potassium level may be normal, even though large losses have occurred. As the dehydration is corrected, potassium levels may decrease rapidly, and thus need to be replaced. This is best done by Oral Rehydration Solution (ORS).

=== Antibiotics ===
Antibiotic treatments for one to three days shorten the course of the disease and reduce the severity of the symptoms. Use of antibiotics also reduces fluid requirements. Patients often recover completely without the use of antibiotics as long as hydration is maintained. The WHO only recommends antibiotics in those with severe dehydration.

Doxycycline is typically used first line, although some strains of V. cholerae have shown resistance. Testing for resistance during an outbreak can help determine appropriate future choices. Other antibiotics proven to be effective include cotrimoxazole, erythromycin, tetracycline, chloramphenicol, and furazolidone. Fluoroquinolones, such as ciprofloxacin, also may be used, but resistance has been reported.

Antibiotics improve outcomes in those who are both severely and not severely dehydrated. Azithromycin and tetracycline may work better than doxycycline or ciprofloxacin.

=== Zinc supplementation ===
In Bangladesh zinc supplementation reduced the duration and severity of diarrhea in children with cholera when given with antibiotics and rehydration therapy as needed. It reduced the length of disease by eight hours and the amount of diarrhea stool by 10%. Supplementation appears to be also effective in both treating and preventing infectious diarrhea due to other causes among children in the developing world.

== Prognosis ==
If people with cholera are treated quickly and properly, the mortality rate is less than 1%; however, with untreated cholera, the mortality rate rises to 50–60%.

For certain genetic strains of cholera, such as the one present during the 2010 epidemic in Haiti and the 2004 outbreak in India, death can occur within two hours of becoming ill.

== Epidemiology ==
Cholera affects an estimated 2.8 million people worldwide, and causes approximately 95,000 deaths a year (uncertainty range: 21,000–143,000) as of 2015. This occurs mainly in the developing world.

In the early 1980s, death rates are believed to have still been higher than three million a year. It is difficult to calculate exact numbers of cases, as many go unreported due to concerns that an outbreak may have a negative impact on the tourism of a country. As of 2004, cholera remained both epidemic and endemic in many areas of the world.

Recent major outbreaks are the 2010s Haiti cholera outbreak and the 2016–2022 Yemen cholera outbreak. In October 2016, an outbreak of cholera began in war-ravaged Yemen. WHO called it "the worst cholera outbreak in the world". In 2019, 93% of the reported 923,037 cholera cases were from Yemen (with 1911 deaths reported). Between September 2019 and September 2020, a global total of over 450,000 cases and over 900 deaths was reported; however, the accuracy of these numbers suffer from over-reporting from countries that report suspected cases (and not laboratory confirmed cases), as well as under-reporting from countries that do not report official cases (such as Bangladesh, India and Philippines).

Although much is known about the mechanisms behind the spread of cholera, researchers still do not have a full understanding of what makes cholera outbreaks happen in some places and not others. The lack of safe disposal of human feces and inadequate treatment of drinking water greatly facilitate its spread. Bodies of water have been found to serve as a reservoir of infection, and seafood shipped long distances can spread the disease. Cholera incidence rates were higher during both floods and droughts than during periods without either event.

Cholera had disappeared from the Americas for most of the 20th century, but it reappeared toward the end of that century, beginning with a severe outbreak in Peru. This was followed by the 2010s Haiti cholera outbreak and another outbreak of cholera in Haiti amid the 2018–2023 Haitian crisis. As of August 2021 the disease is endemic in Africa and some areas of eastern and western Asia (Bangladesh, India and Yemen). Cholera is not endemic in Europe; all reported cases had a travel history to endemic areas.

=== History of outbreaks ===
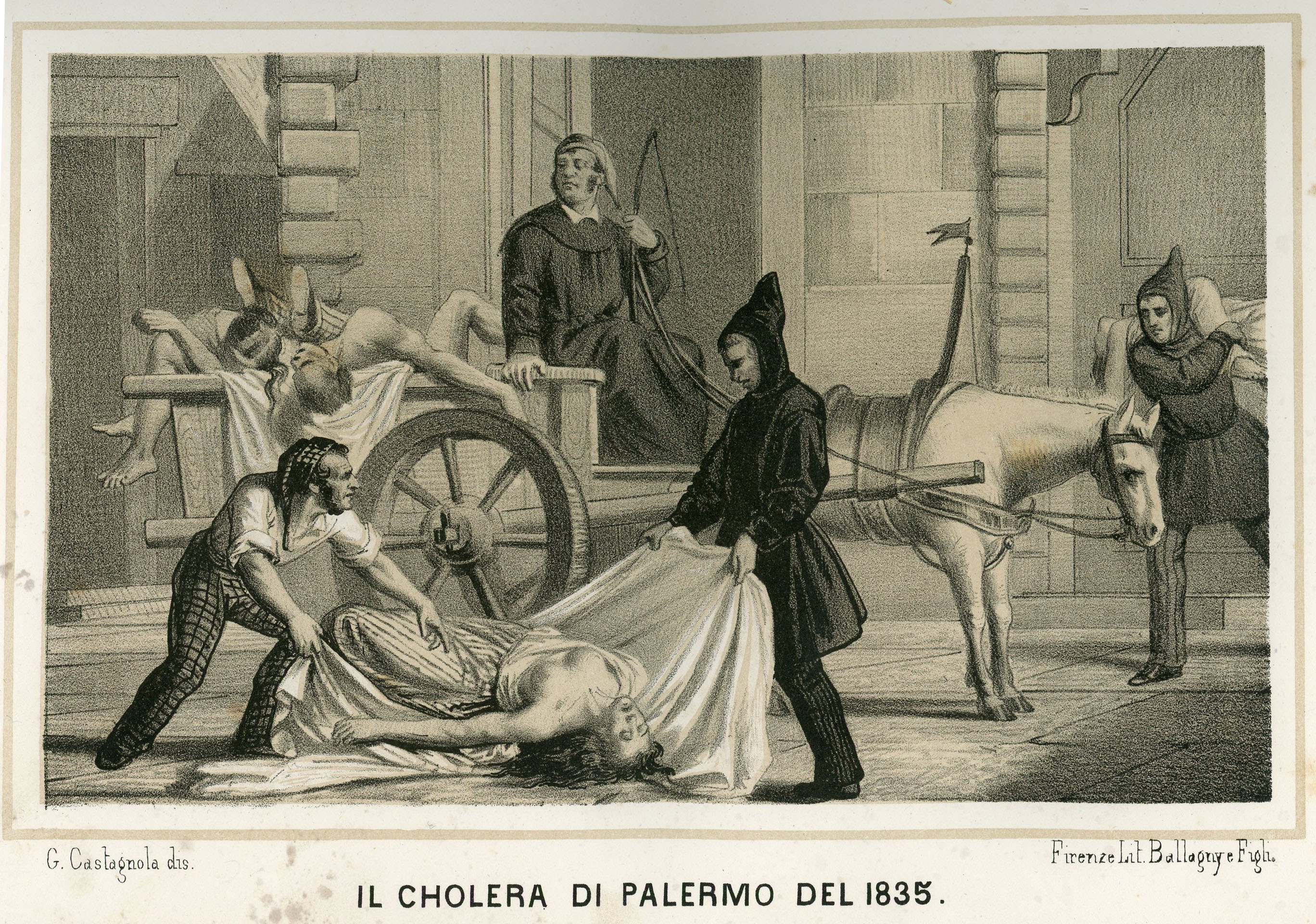
Disposal of dead bodies during the cholera epidemic in Palermo in 1835

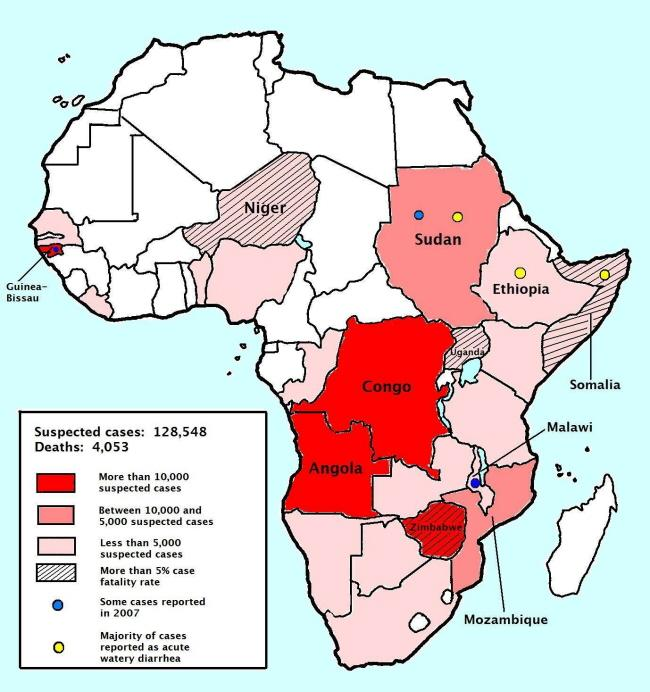
Map of the 2008–2009 cholera outbreak in sub-Saharan Africa showing the statistics as of 12 February 2009

The word cholera is from Greek: χολέρα kholera from χολή kholē "bile". Cholera likely has its origins in the Indian subcontinent as evidenced by its prevalence in the region for centuries.

References to cholera appear in the European literature as early as 1642, from the Dutch physician Jakob de Bondt's description in his De Medicina Indorum. (The "Indorum" of the title refers to the East Indies. He also gave first European descriptions of other diseases.) But at the time, the word "cholera" was historically used by European physicians to refer to any gastrointestinal upset resulting in yellow diarrhea. De Bondt thus used a common word already in regular use to describe the new disease. This was a frequent practice of the time. It was not until the 1830s that the name for severe yellow diarrhea changed in English from "cholera" to "cholera morbus" to differentiate it from what was then known as "Asiatic cholera", or that associated with origins in India and the East.

Early outbreaks in the Indian subcontinent are believed to have been the result of crowded, poor living conditions, as well as the presence of pools of still water, both of which provide ideal conditions for cholera to thrive. The disease first spread by travelers along trade routes (land and sea) to Russia in 1817, later to the rest of Europe, and from Europe to North America and the rest of the world, (hence the name "Asiatic cholera"). Seven cholera pandemics have occurred since the early 19th century; the first one did not reach the Americas. The seventh pandemic originated in Indonesia in 1961.

The first cholera pandemic occurred in the Bengal region of India, near Calcutta starting in 1817 through 1824. The disease dispersed from India to Southeast Asia, the Middle East, Europe, and Eastern Africa. The movement of British Army and Navy ships and personnel is believed to have contributed to the range of the pandemic, since the ships carried people with the disease to the shores of the Indian Ocean, from Africa to Indonesia, and north to China and Japan.

The second pandemic lasted from 1826 to 1837 and particularly affected North America and Europe. Advancements in transport and global trade, and increased human migration, including soldiers, meant that more people were carrying the disease more widely.

The third pandemic erupted in 1846, persisted until 1860, extended to North Africa, and reached North and South America. It was introduced to North America at Quebec, Canada, via Irish immigrants from the Great Famine. In this pandemic, Brazil was affected for the first time.

The fourth pandemic lasted from 1863 to 1875, spreading from India to Naples and Spain, and reaching the United States at New Orleans, Louisiana in 1873. It spread throughout the Mississippi River system on the continent.

The fifth pandemic was from 1881 to 1896. It started in India and spread to Europe, Asia, and South America. The sixth pandemic ran from 1899 to 1923. These epidemics had a lower number of fatalities because physicians and researchers had a greater understanding of the cholera bacteria. Egypt, the Arabian peninsula, Persia, India, and the Philippines were hit hardest during these epidemics. Other areas, such as Germany in 1892 (primarily the city of Hamburg, where more than 8,600 people died) and Naples from 1910 to 1911, also had severe outbreaks.

The seventh pandemic originated in 1961 in Indonesia and is marked by the emergence of a new strain, nicknamed El Tor, which still persists (as of 2018) in developing countries. This pandemic had initially subsided about 1975 and was thought to have ended, but, as noted, it has persisted. There were a rise in cases in the 1990s and since.

Cholera became widespread in the 19th century. Since then it has killed tens of millions of people. In Russia alone, between 1847 and 1851, more than one million people died from the disease. It killed 150,000 Americans during the second pandemic. Between 1900 and 1920, perhaps eight million people died of cholera in India. Cholera officially became the first reportable disease in the United States due to the significant effects it had on health. John Snow, in England, in 1854 was the first to identify the importance of contaminated water as its source of transmission. Cholera is now no longer considered a pressing health threat in Europe and North America due to filtering and chlorination of water supplies, but it still strongly affects populations in developing countries.

In the past, vessels flew a yellow quarantine flag if any crew members or passengers had cholera. No one aboard a vessel flying a yellow flag would be allowed ashore for an extended period, typically 30 to 40 days.

Historically many different claimed remedies have existed in folklore. Many of the older remedies were based on the miasma theory, that the disease was transmitted by bad air. Some believed that abdominal chilling made one more susceptible, and flannel and cholera belts were included in army kits. In the 1854–1855 outbreak in Naples, homeopathic camphor was used according to Hahnemann. Dr. Hahnemann laid down three main remedies that would be curative in that disease; in early and simple cases camphor; in later stages with excessive cramping, cuprum or with excessive evacuations and profuse cold sweat, veratrum album. These are the Trio Cholera remedies used by homoeopaths around the world. T. J. Ritter's Mother's Remedies book lists tomato syrup as a home remedy from northern America. Elecampane was recommended in the United Kingdom, according to William Thomas Fernie. The first effective human vaccine was developed in 1885, and the first effective antibiotic was developed in 1948.

Cholera cases are much less frequent in developed countries where governments have helped to establish water sanitation practices and effective medical treatments. In the 19th century the United States, for example, had a severe cholera problem similar to those in some developing countries. It had three large cholera outbreaks in the 1800s, which can be attributed to Vibrio cholerae's spread through interior waterways such as the Erie Canal and the extensive Mississippi River valley system, as well as the major ports along the Eastern Seaboard and their cities upriver. The island of Manhattan in New York City touches the Atlantic Ocean, where cholera collected from river waters and ship discharges just off the coast. At this time, New York City did not have as effective a sanitation system as it developed in the later 20th century, so cholera spread through the city's water supply.

Cholera morbus is a historical term that was used to refer to gastroenteritis rather than specifically to what is now defined as the disease of cholera.

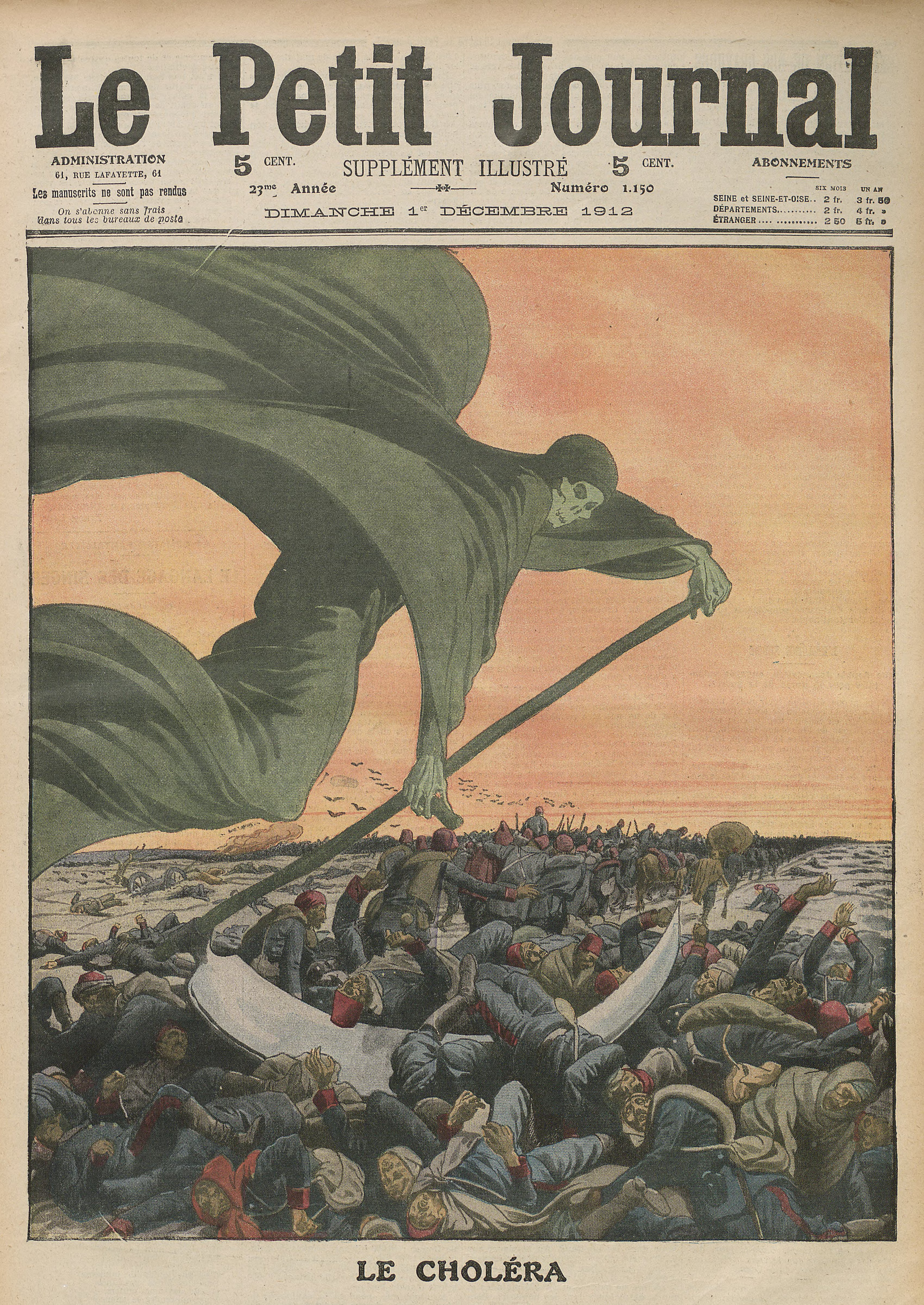
Drawing of Death bringing cholera, in Le Petit Journal (1912)

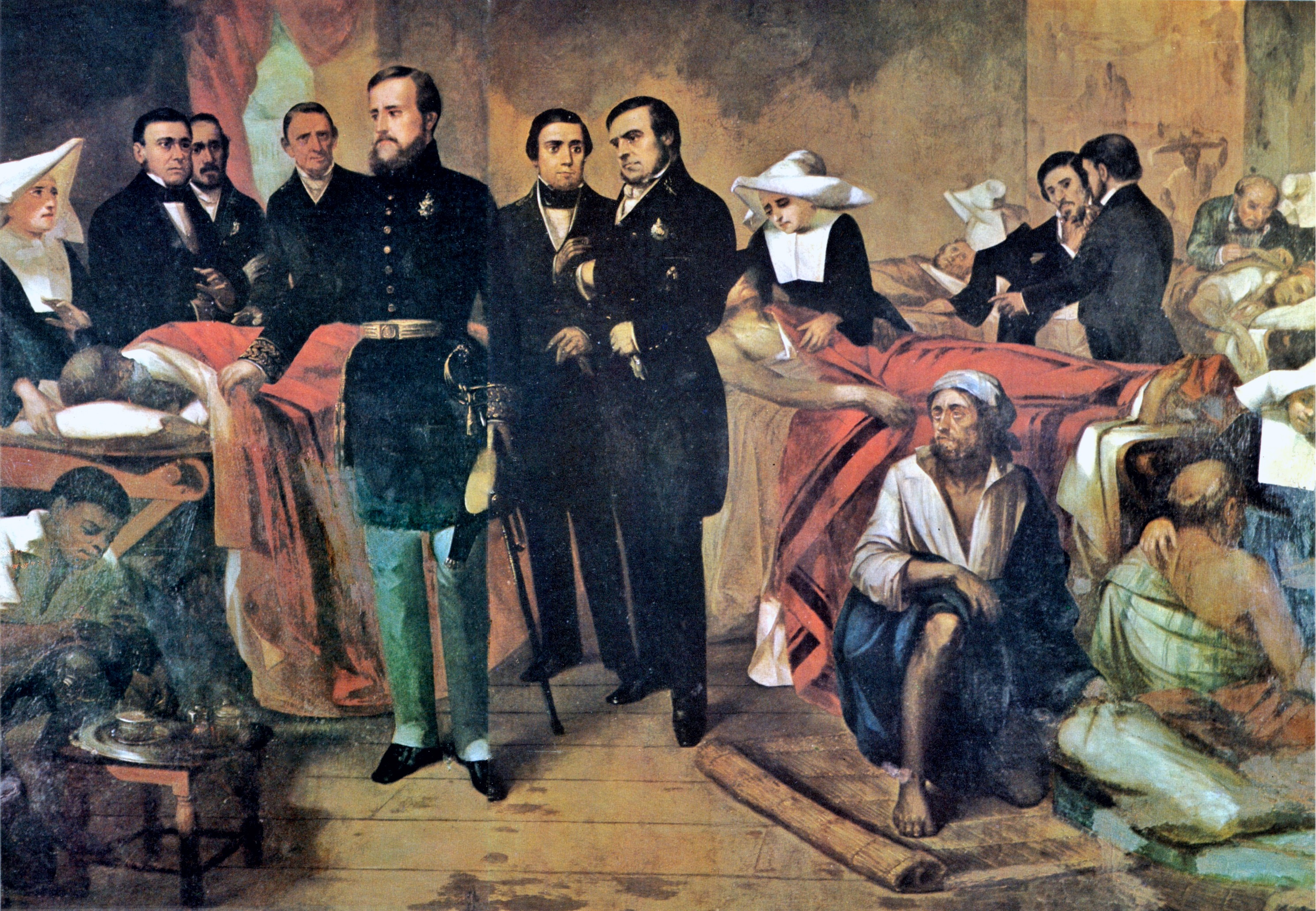
Emperor Pedro II of Brazil visiting people with cholera in 1855

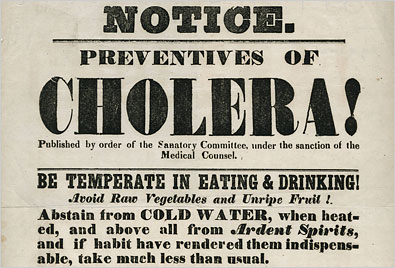
Hand bill from the New York City Board of Health, 1832—the outdated public health advice demonstrates the lack of understanding of the disease and its causative factors.

=== Research ===
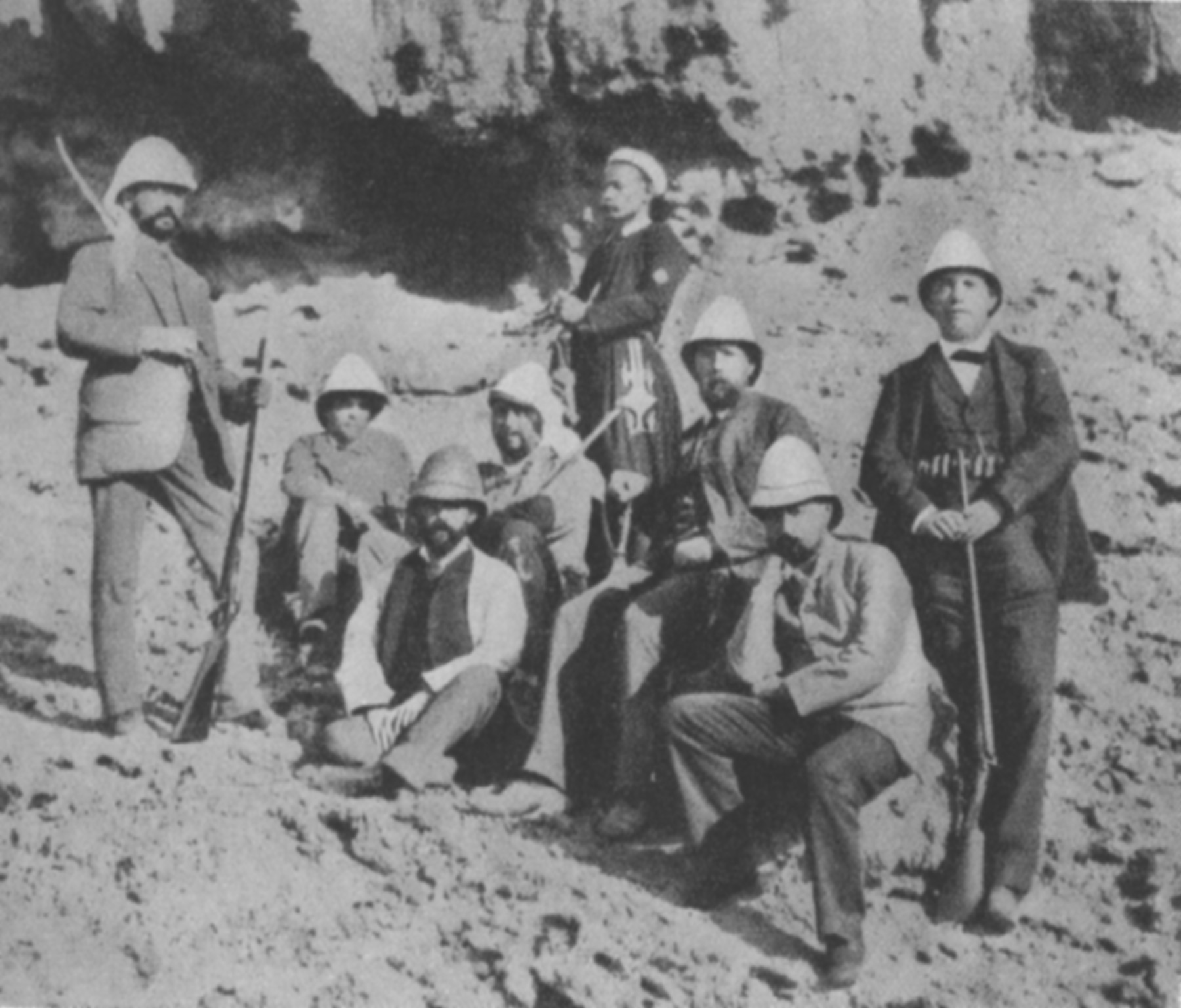
Robert Koch (third from the right) on a cholera research expedition in Egypt in 1884, one year after he identified V. cholerae

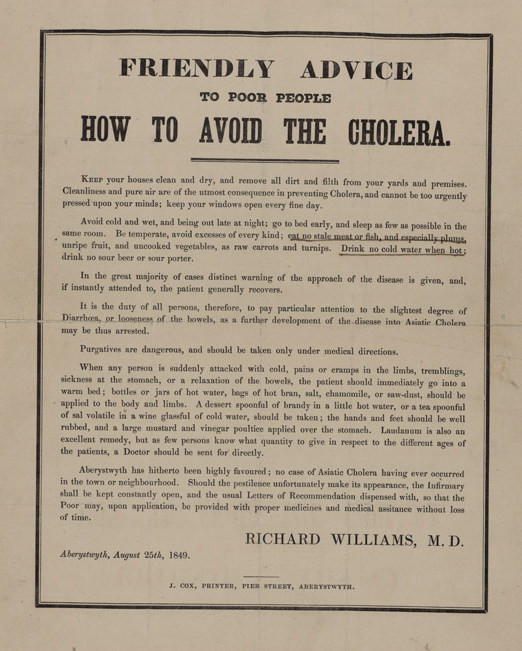
How to avoid the cholera leaflet; Aberystwyth; August 1849

One of the major contributions to fighting cholera was made by the physician and pioneer medical scientist John Snow (1813–1858), who in 1854 found a link between cholera and contaminated drinking water. Dr. Snow proposed a microbial origin for epidemic cholera in 1849. In his major "state of the art" review of 1855, he proposed a substantially complete and correct model for the cause of the disease. In two pioneering epidemiological field studies, he was able to demonstrate human sewage contamination was the most probable disease vector in two major epidemics in London in 1854. His model was not immediately accepted, but it was increasingly seen as plausible as medical microbiology developed over the next 30 years or so. For his work on cholera, John Snow is often regarded as the "Father of Epidemiology".

The bacterium was isolated in 1854 by Italian anatomist Filippo Pacini, but its exact nature and his results were not widely known. In the same year, the Catalan Joaquim Balcells i Pascual discovered the bacterium. In 1856 António Augusto da Costa Simões and José Ferreira de Macedo Pinto, two Portuguese researchers, are believed to have done the same.

Between the mid-1850s and the 1900s, cities in developed nations made massive investment in clean water supply and well-separated sewage treatment infrastructures. This eliminated the threat of cholera epidemics from the major developed cities in the world. In 1883, Robert Koch identified V. cholerae with a microscope as the bacillus causing the disease.

Hemendra Nath Chatterjee, a Bengali scientist, was the first to formulate and demonstrate the effectiveness of oral rehydration salt (ORS) to treat diarrhea. In his 1953 paper, published in The Lancet, he states that promethazine can stop vomiting during cholera and then oral rehydration is possible. The formulation of the fluid replacement solution was 4 g of sodium chloride, 25 g of glucose and 1000 ml of water.

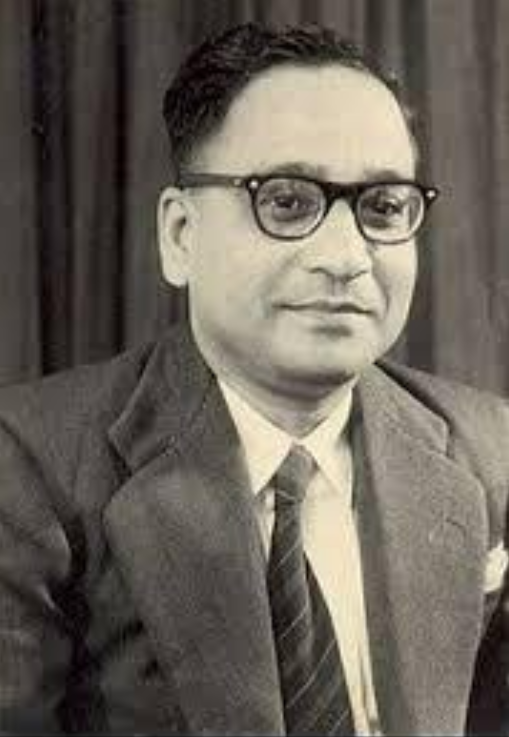
Prof. Sambhu Nath De, who discovered the cholera toxin and successfully demonstrated the transmission of cholera pathogen by bacterial enteric toxin

Indian medical scientist Sambhu Nath De discovered the cholera toxin, the animal model of cholera, and successfully demonstrated the method of transmission of cholera pathogen Vibrio cholerae.

Robert Allan Phillips, working at US Naval Medical Research Unit Two in Southeast Asia, evaluated the pathophysiology of the disease using modern laboratory chemistry techniques. He developed a protocol for rehydration. His research led the Lasker Foundation to award him its prize in 1967.

More recently, in 2002, Alam, et al., studied stool samples from patients at the International Centre for Diarrhoeal Disease in Dhaka, Bangladesh. From the various experiments they conducted, the researchers found a correlation between the passage of V. cholerae through the human digestive system and an increased infectivity state. Furthermore, the researchers found the bacterium creates a hyperinfected state where genes that control biosynthesis of amino acids, iron uptake systems, and formation of periplasmic nitrate reductase complexes were induced just before defecation. These induced characteristics allow the cholera vibrios to survive in the "rice water" stools, an environment of limited oxygen and iron, of patients with a cholera infection.

=== Global Strategy ===
In 2017, the WHO launched the "Ending Cholera: a global roadmap to 2030" strategy which aims to reduce cholera deaths by 90% by 2030. The strategy was developed by the Global Task Force on Cholera Control (GTFCC) which develops country-specific plans and monitors progress. The approach to achieve this goal combines surveillance, water sanitation, rehydration treatment and oral vaccines. Specifically, the control strategy focuses on three approaches: i) early detection and response to outbreaks to contain outbreaks, ii) stopping cholera transmission through improved sanitation and vaccines in hotspots, and iii) a global framework for cholera control through the GTFCC.

The WHO and the GTFCC do not consider global cholera eradication a viable goal. Even though humans are the only host of cholera, the bacterium can persist in the environment without a human host. While global eradication is not possible, elimination of human to human transmission may be possible. Local elimination is possible, which has been underway most recently during the 2010s Haiti cholera outbreak. Haiti aims to achieve certification of elimination by 2022.

The GTFCC targets 47 countries, 13 of which have established vaccination campaigns.

== Society and culture ==
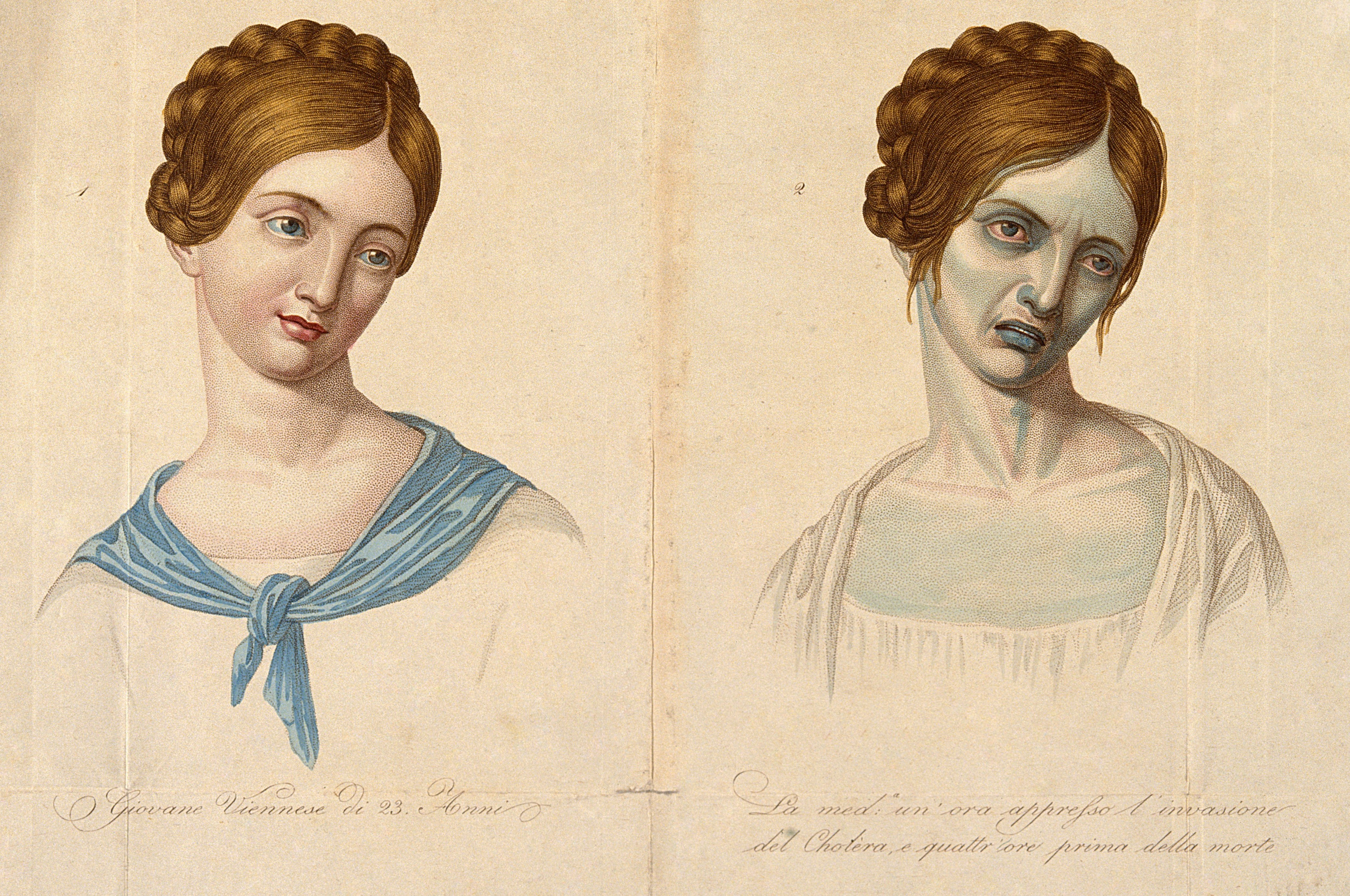
A young woman of Vienna who died of cholera, depicted when healthy and four hours before death, January 1831

=== Health policy ===
In many developing countries, cholera still reaches its victims through contaminated water sources, and countries without proper sanitation techniques have greater incidence of the disease. Governments can play a role in this. In 2008, for example, the Zimbabwean cholera outbreak was due partly to the government's role, according to a report from the James Baker Institute. The Haitian government's inability to provide safe drinking water after the 2010 earthquake led to an increase in cholera cases as well.

Similarly, South Africa's cholera outbreak was exacerbated by the government's policy of privatizing water programs. The wealthy elite of the country were able to afford safe water while others had to use water from cholera-infected rivers.

According to Rita R. Colwell of the James Baker Institute, if cholera does begin to spread, government preparedness is crucial. A government's ability to contain the disease before it extends to other areas can prevent a high death toll and the development of an epidemic or even pandemic. Effective disease surveillance can ensure that cholera outbreaks are recognized as soon as possible and dealt with appropriately. Oftentimes, this will allow public health programs to determine and control the cause of the cases, whether it is unsanitary water or seafood that have accumulated a lot of Vibrio cholerae specimens. Having an effective surveillance program contributes to a government's ability to prevent cholera from spreading. In the year 2000 in the state of Kerala in India, the Kottayam district was determined to be "Cholera-affected"; this pronouncement led to task forces that concentrated on educating citizens with 13,670 information sessions about human health. These task forces promoted the boiling of water to obtain safe water, and provided chlorine and oral rehydration salts. Ultimately, this helped to control the spread of the disease to other areas and minimize deaths. On the other hand, researchers have shown that most of the citizens infected during the 1991 cholera outbreak in Bangladesh lived in rural areas, and were not recognized by the government's surveillance program. This inhibited physicians' abilities to detect cholera cases early.

According to Colwell, the quality and inclusiveness of a country's health care system affects the control of cholera, as it did in the Zimbabwean cholera outbreak. While sanitation practices are important, when governments respond quickly and have readily available vaccines, the country will have a lower cholera death toll. Affordability of vaccines can be a problem; if the governments do not provide vaccinations, only the wealthy may be able to afford them and there will be a greater toll on the country's poor. The speed with which government leaders respond to cholera outbreaks is important.

Besides contributing to an effective or declining public health care system and water sanitation treatments, government can have indirect effects on cholera control and the effectiveness of a response to cholera. A country's government can impact its ability to prevent disease and control its spread. A speedy government response backed by a fully functioning health care system and financial resources can prevent cholera's spread. This limits cholera's ability to cause death, or at the very least a decline in education, as children are kept out of school to minimize the risk of infection. Inversely, poor government response can lead to civil unrest and cholera riots.

=== Notable cases ===
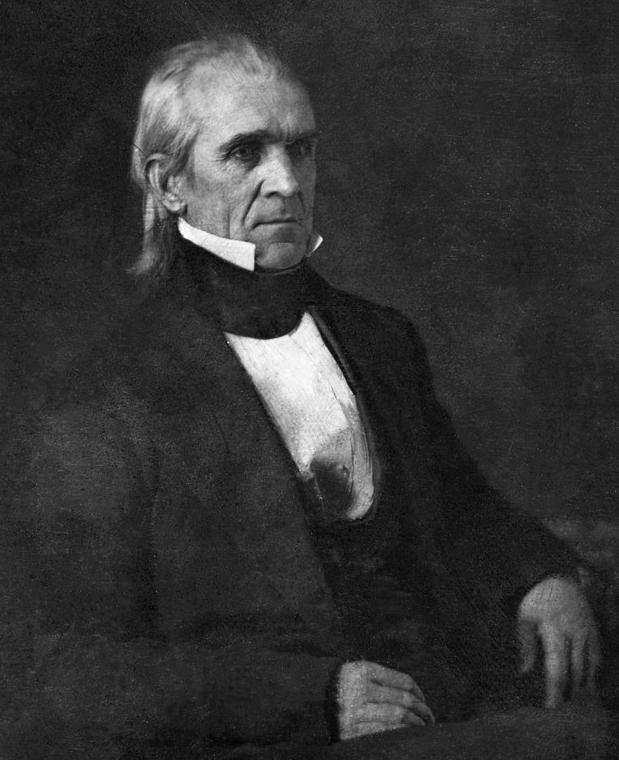
US President James K. Polk was a famous victim of cholera.

- Tchaikovsky's death has traditionally been attributed to cholera, most probably contracted through drinking contaminated water several days earlier. Tchaikovsky's mother died of cholera, and his father became sick with cholera at this time but made a full recovery. Some scholars, however, including English musicologist and Tchaikovsky authority David Brown and biographer Anthony Holden, have theorized that his death was a suicide.
- 2010s Haiti cholera outbreak. Ten months after the 2010 earthquake, an outbreak swept over Haiti, traced to a United Nations base of peacekeepers from Nepal. This marks the worst cholera outbreak in recent history, as well as the best documented cholera outbreak in modern public health.
- Adam Mickiewicz, Polish poet and novelist, is thought to have died of cholera in Istanbul in 1855.
- Sadi Carnot, physicist, a pioneer of thermodynamics (d. 1832)
- Charles X, King of France (d. 1836)
- James K. Polk, eleventh president of the United States (d. 1849)
- Carl von Clausewitz, Prussian soldier and German military theorist (d. 1831)
- Elliot Bovill, Chief Justice of the Straits Settlements (1893)
- Nikola Tesla, Serbian-American inventor, engineer and futurist known for his contributions to the design of the modern alternating current (AC) electricity supply system, contracted cholera in 1873 at the age of 17. He was bedridden for nine months, and near death multiple times, but survived and fully recovered.

=== In popular culture ===
Unlike tuberculosis ("consumption") which in literature and the arts was often romanticized as a disease of denizens of the demimonde or those with an artistic temperament, cholera is a disease which almost entirely affects the poor living in unsanitary conditions. This, and the unpleasant course of the disease – which includes voluminous "rice-water" diarrhea, the hemorrhaging of liquids from the mouth, and violent muscle contractions which continue even after death – has discouraged the disease from being romanticized, or even being factually presented in popular culture.

- The 1889 novel Mastro-don Gesualdo by Giovanni Verga presents the course of a cholera epidemic across the island of Sicily, but does not show the suffering of those affected.
- Cholera is a major plot device in The Painted Veil, a 1925 novel by W. Somerset Maugham. The story concerns a shy bacteriologist who discovers his young, pretty wife is having an adulterous affair. The doctor exacts revenge on his wife by inducing her to travel with him to mainland China which is in the grips of an horrific cholera outbreak. The ravages of the disease are frankly described in the novel.
- In Thomas Mann's novella Death in Venice, first published in 1912 as Der Tod in Venedig, Mann "presented the disease as emblematic of the final 'bestial degradation' of the sexually transgressive author Gustav von Aschenbach." Contrary to the actual facts of how violently cholera kills, Mann has his protagonist die peacefully on a beach in a deck chair. Luchino Visconti's 1971 film version also hid from the audience the actual course of the disease. Mann's novella was also made into an opera by Benjamin Britten in 1973, his last one, and into a ballet by John Neumeier for his Hamburg Ballet company, in December 2003.*
- The Horseman on the Roof (orig. French Le Hussard sur le toit) is a 1951 adventure novel written by Jean Giono. It tells the story of Angelo Pardi, a young Italian carbonaro colonel of hussars, caught up in the 1832 cholera epidemic in Provence. In 1995, it was made into a film of the same name directed by Jean-Paul Rappeneau.
- In Gabriel Garcia Márquez's 1985 novel Love in the Time of Cholera, cholera is "a looming background presence rather than a central figure requiring vile description." The novel was adapted in 2007 for the film of the same name directed by Mike Newell.
- In The Secret Garden, Mary Lennox's parents die from cholera.

== Country examples ==
=== Zambia ===
In Zambia, widespread cholera outbreaks have occurred since 1977, most commonly in the capital city of Lusaka. In 2017, an outbreak of cholera was declared in Zambia after laboratory confirmation of Vibrio cholerae O1, biotype El Tor, serotype Ogawa, from stool samples from two patients with acute watery diarrhea. There was a rapid increase in the number of cases from several hundred cases in early December 2017 to approximately 2,000 by early January 2018. With intensification of the rains, new cases increased on a daily basis reaching a peak on the first week of January 2018 with over 700 cases reported.

In collaboration with partners, the Zambia Ministry of Health (MoH) launched a multifaceted public health response that included increased chlorination of the Lusaka municipal water supply, provision of emergency water supplies, water quality monitoring and testing, enhanced surveillance, epidemiologic investigations, a cholera vaccination campaign, aggressive case management and health care worker training, and laboratory testing of clinical samples.

The Zambian Ministry of Health implemented a reactive one-dose Oral Cholera Vaccine (OCV) campaign in April 2016 in three Lusaka compounds, followed by a pre-emptive second-round in December.

=== Nigeria ===
In June 2024, the Nigeria Centre for Disease Control and Prevention (NCDC) announced a total of 1,141 suspected and 65 confirmed cases of cholera with 30 deaths from 96 Local Government Areas (LGAs) in 30 states of the country. NCDC, in its public health advisory, said Abia, Bayelsa, Bauchi, Cross River, Delta, Imo, Katsina, Lagos, Nasarawa and Zamfara states were the 10 states that contributed 90 percent of the burden of cholera in the country at the time.

=== India ===
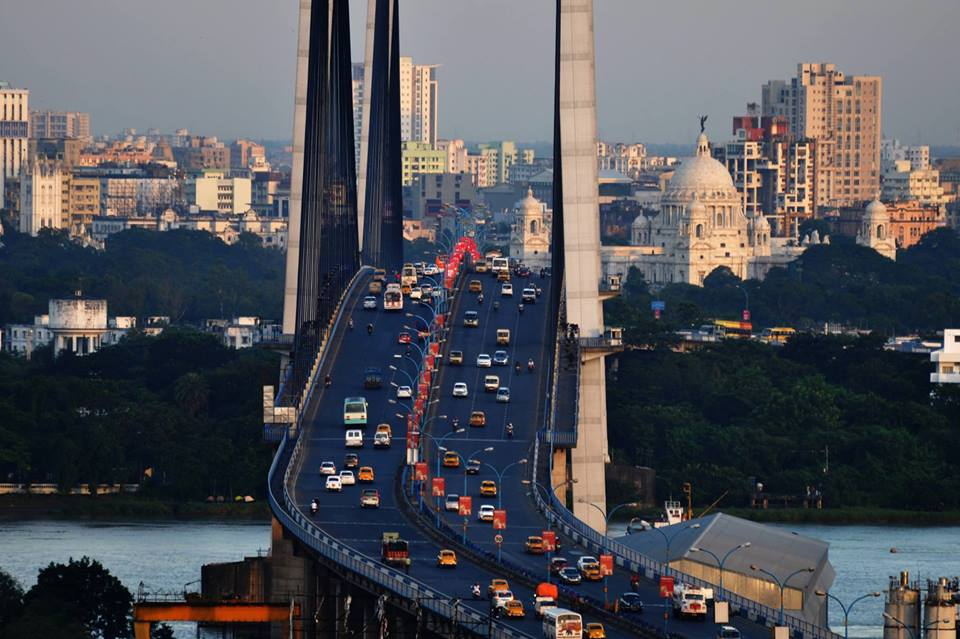
Kolkata suffers from frequent cholera outbreaks.

The city of Kolkata, India, in the state of West Bengal in the Ganges delta, has been described as the "homeland of cholera", with regular outbreaks and pronounced seasonality. In India, where the disease is endemic, cholera outbreaks occur every year between dry seasons and rainy seasons. India is also characterized by high population density, unsafe drinking water, open drains, and poor sanitation, which provide an optimal niche for survival, sustenance, and transmission of Vibrio cholerae.

=== Democratic Republic of Congo ===
In Goma in the Democratic Republic of Congo, cholera has left an enduring mark on human and medical history. Cholera pandemics in the 19th and 20th centuries led to the growth of epidemiology as a science and in recent years it has continued to press advances in the concepts of disease ecology, basic membrane biology, and transmembrane signaling and in the use of scientific information and treatment design.
