= Enophthalmia =

Eyes abnormally sunken into their sockets

In medicine, enophthalmia describes eyes that are abnormally sunken into their sockets. This condition usually affects elderly persons. Surgery can be done to correct it. Bilateral progressive enophthalmos may be the presenting sign of metastatic breast carcinoma, even when local symptoms in the breast are absent.
