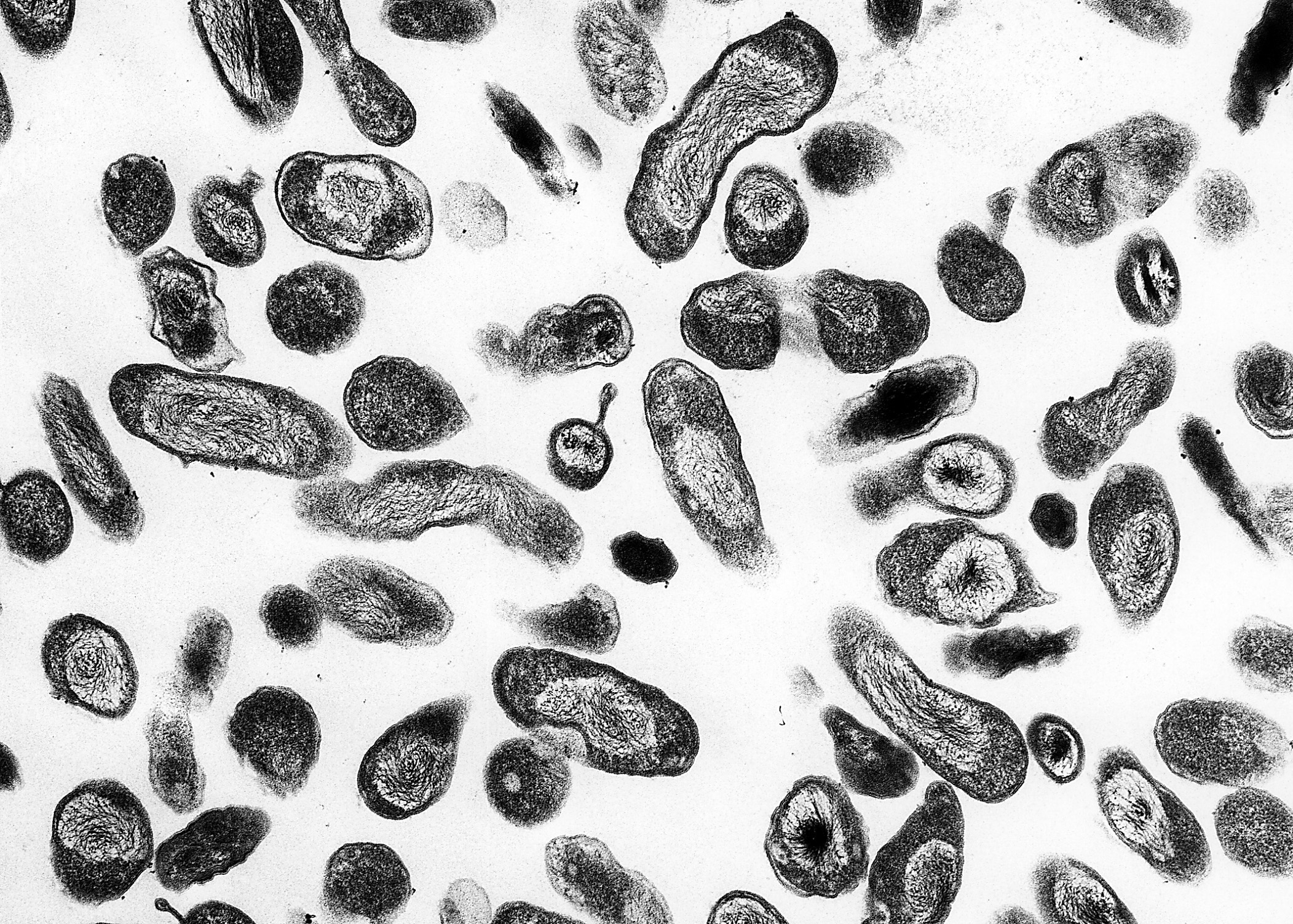
- Coxiella burnetii

Scientific classification
- Domain: Bacteria
- Kingdom: Pseudomonadati
- Phylum: Pseudomonadota
- Class: Gammaproteobacteria
- Order: Legionellales
- Family: Coxiellaceae
- Genus: Coxiella (Philip 1943) Philip 1948

Type species
- Coxiella burnetii

Species
- C. burnetii

= Coxiella (bacterium) =

Genus of bacteria

Coxiella refers to a genus of Gram-negative bacteria in the family Coxiellaceae. It is named after Herald Rea Cox (1907–1986), an American bacteriologist. It is part of the Gammaproteobacteria.

Coxiella burnetii is the best known member of this genus. It is an intracellular parasite and it survives within the phagolysosomes of its host. It causes Q fever.

The majority of Coxiella’s described members are non pathogenic forms which are often found in ticks. Approximately two-thirds of tick species harbour Coxiella-like endosymbionts required for tick survival and reproduction. Genomes of Coxiella-like endosymbionts encode pathways for the biosynthesis of major B vitamins and co-factors that fit closely with the expected nutritional complements required for strict haematophagy. The experimental elimination of Coxiella-like endosymbionts typically results in decreased tick survival, molting, fecundity and egg viability, as well as in physical abnormalities. Coxiella-like endosymbionts are often misidentified as Coxiella burnetii; however, Coxiella-like endosymbionts lack virulence genes and cannot infect humans.

== Molecular signatures ==
Seven conserved signature indels (CSIs) were identified through genomic analyses as exclusively shared by C. burnetii and other unnamed Coxiella-related species in the proteins glutamine-hydrolyzing GMP synthase, type I methionyl aminopeptidase, ribonucleoside-diphosphate reductase subunit alpha, translation initiation factor IF-3, phosphomannomutase-phosphoglucomutase, LPS export ABC transporter ATP-binding protein, and NADH-quinone oxidoreductase subunit G. These CSIs serve to reliably demarcate the genus from other Legionellales species in molecular terms.

Additionally, three CSIs were identified as uniquely shared between the genus Coxiella, and two other genera belonging to the family Coxiellaceae, Diplorickettsia and Rickettsiella. The absence of Aquicella species (the remaining genus within the family Coxiellaceae) from the shared CSIs suggests that the genera Coxiella, Diplorickettsia and Rickettsiella share a common ancestor exclusive of Aquicella.
