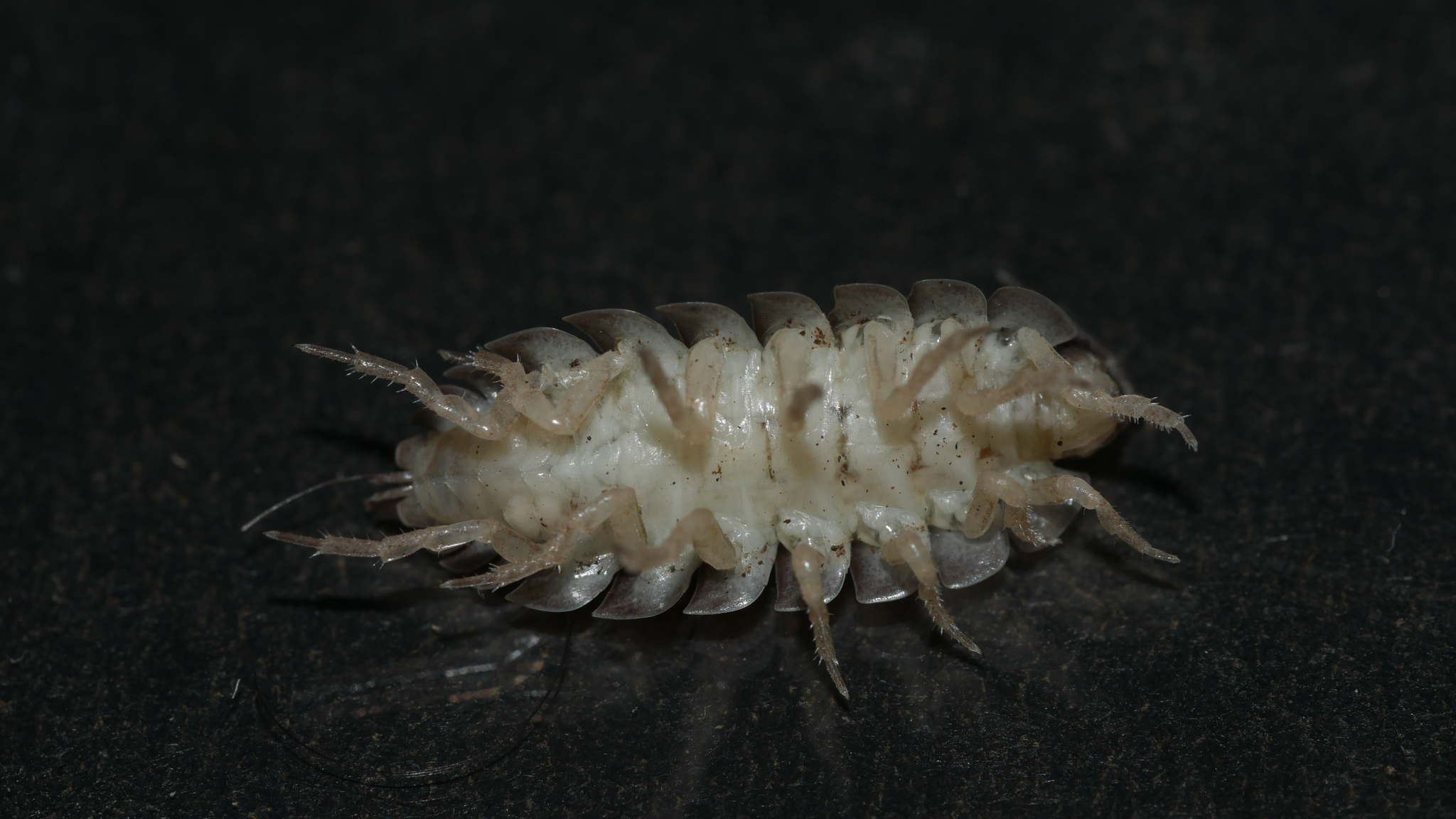
- Rickettsiella infection on Porcellio laevis

Scientific classification
- Domain: Bacteria
- Kingdom: Pseudomonadati
- Phylum: Pseudomonadota
- Class: Gammaproteobacteria
- Order: Legionellales
- Family: Coxiellaceae
- Genus: Rickettsiella; Philip, 1956

= Rickettsiella =

Genus of bacteria

Rickettsiella is a genus of bacteria in the family Coxiellaceae. It should not be confused with Rickettsia. It is currently considered of the Gammaproteobacteria. However, its placement under Coxiellaceae instead of Legionellaceae has been challenged.

== Molecular signatures and taxonomy ==
Members of the genera Rickettsiella and Diplorickettsia are observed to form a reliable clade in phylogenetic trees constructed from various datasets of concatenated protein sequences and 16S rRNA sequences, suggesting that they might belong to a single genus. Genomic analyses identified 12 conserved signature indels (CSIs) that are specific for this clade in the proteins inositol monophosphatase, lysyl-tRNA synthetase, elongation factor P-(R)-beta-lysine ligase, tol-Pal system beta propeller repeat protein TolB, FKBP-type peptidyl-prolyl cis-trans isomerase, response regulator transcription factor, 30S ribosomal protein S2, glycine cleavage system aminomethyltransferase GcvT, M3 family metallopeptidase, lysm peptidoglycan-binding domain-containing protein and oligopeptide transporter. The presence of these CSIs reliably distinguishes this clade from other Legionellales species in molecular terms, further supporting the combination of the genera Rickettsiella and Diplorickettsia.

Additionally, three CSIs were identified as uniquely shared between Diplorickettsia, Rickettsiella and Coxiella, another genus belonging to the family Coxiellaceae. The absence of Aquicella species (the remaining genus within the family Coxiellaceae) from the shared CSIs suggests that the genera Coxiella, Diplorickettsia and Rickettsiella share a common ancestor exclusive of Aquicella.
