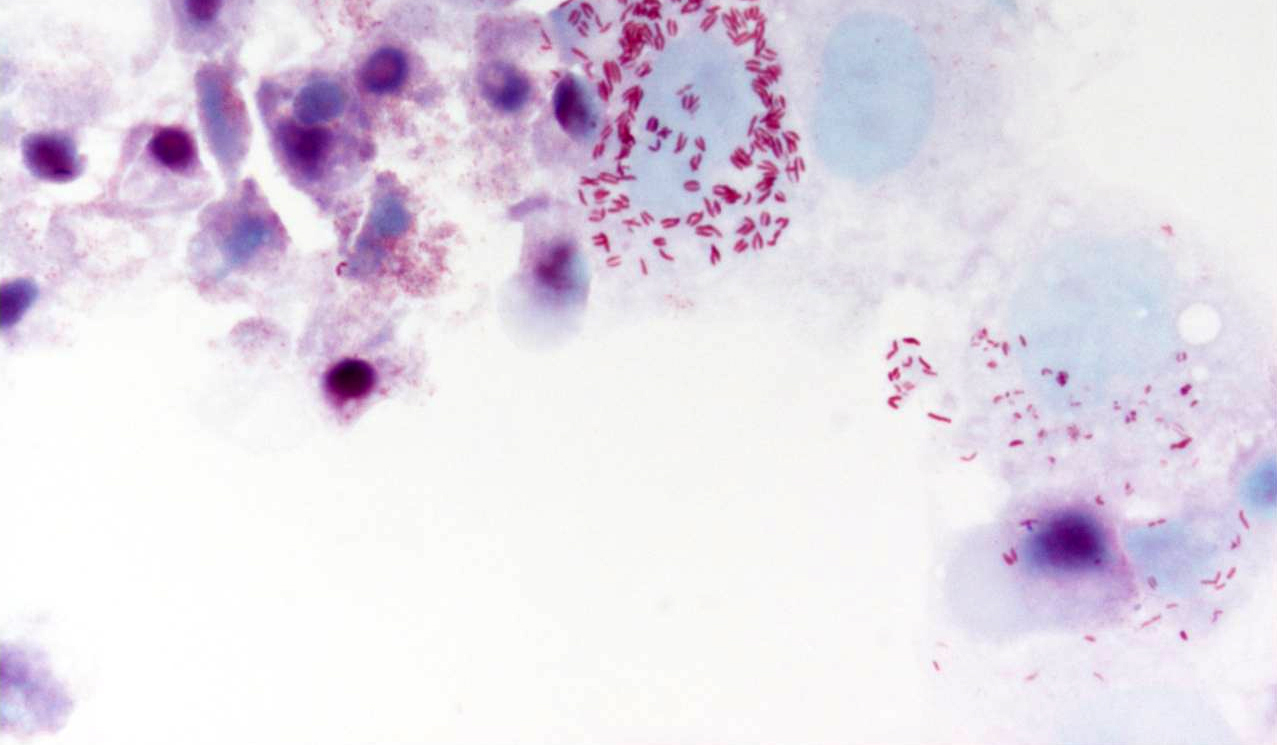
- Intracellular red rods usually grouped in pairs but not connected with each other

Scientific classification
- Domain: Bacteria
- Phylum: Pseudomonadota
- Class: Gammaproteobacteria
- Order: Legionellales
- Family: Coxiellaceae
- Genus: Diplorickettsia
- Species: D. massiliensis

Binomial name
- Diplorickettsia massiliensis Mediannikov et al. 2011

= Diplorickettsia massiliensis =

Species of bacterium

Diplorickettsia massiliensis species is an obligate intracellular, gram negative bacterium isolated from Ixodes ricinus ticks collected in Slovak republic forest geographically from southeastern part of Rovinka in 2006. They belong to the gammaproteobacteria class and are non endospore forming, small rods usually grouped in pairs. The bacteria are non-motile, and 16S rRNA, rpoB, parC and ftsY gene sequencing indicate that this bacterium is clearly different from all other recognized species. An initial phylogenetic analysis based on 16S rRNA, clustered D. massiliensis with Rickettsiella grylli. Because of its low 16S rDNA similarity (94%) with R. grylli, it was classified as a new genus Diplorickettsia into the family Coxiellaceae and the order Legionellales. D. massiliensis strain 20B was identified in three patients with suspected tick-borne infections that exhibited a specific seroconversion. The evidence of infection was further reconfirmed by using PCR-assay, thus established its role as a human pathogen and later whole genome sequencing was performed.

== Description ==
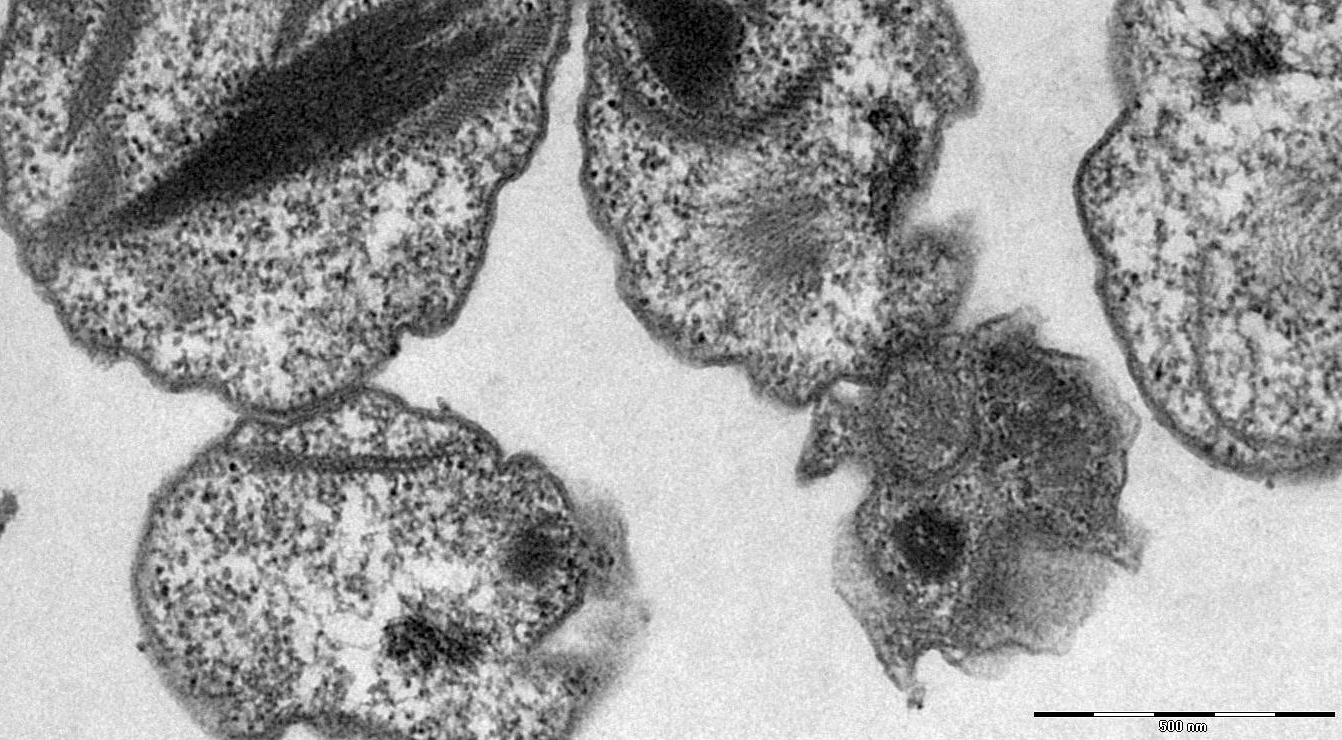
Observation of Diplorickettsia massiliensis Strain 20B using transmission electron microscopy

Diplorickettsia massiliensis (mas.si' li.en.sis. L. gen. adj. massiliensis, from Massilia, the Latin name of Marseille, France, where the organism was first grown, identified and characterized). The description is for that of genus type strain 20B. The known geographical distribution of this bacterium is Slovakia. This isolate has been deposited in the collection of the two World Health Organization Collaborative Centers for Rickettsial Reference and Research in Bratislava, Slovak Republic and the Faculté de Médecine, University of the Mediterranean in Marseille, France, as well as in the German Collection of Microorganisms and Cell Cultures (Deutsche Sammlung von Mikroorganismen und Zellkulturen, DSMZ) under the reference DSM 233381.

The GenBank/EMBL/DDBJ accession numbers for the 16S rRNA gene, rpoB, parC and ftsY sequences of strain B20 are GQ857549, GQ983049, GQ983050, and GU289825, respectively.

== Phylogenetic analysis and molecular signatures ==
Comparative 16S rRNA gene sequence analysis showed that this strain belongs to the family Coxiellaceae, order Legionellales of Gamma-proteobacteria, and the closest relatives are different Rickettsiella spp. A 1476-bp fragment of the rrs gene encoding the 16S ribosomal RNA was amplified and sequenced. Surprisingly, a BLAST search did not result in a close similarity with any published 16S RNA gene sequences from other bacteria. The level of 16S rRNA gene sequence similarity between strain 20B and other recognized species of the family was below 94.5%. Partial sequences of the rpoB, parC and ftsY genes confirmed the phylogenetic position of the new isolate. The G+C content estimated on the basis of whole genome analysis of strain 20B was 37.88%. On the basis of its phenotypic and genotypic properties, together with phylogenetic distinctiveness, Mediannikov et al. proposed that strain 20B to be classified in the new genus Diplorickettsia as the type strain of a novel species named Diplorickettsia massiliensis sp. nov.

Diplorickettsia massiliensis and members of the genus Rickettsiella were observed to form a reliable clade in phylogenetic trees, suggesting that they might belong to a single genus. 12 conserved signature indels (CSIs) were also identified for this clade in the proteins inositol monophosphatase, lysyl-tRNA synthetase, elongation factor P-(R)-beta-lysine ligase, tol-Pal system beta propeller repeat protein TolB, FKBP-type peptidyl-prolyl cis-trans isomerase, response regulator transcription factor, 30S ribosomal protein S2, glycine cleavage system aminomethyltransferase GcvT, M3 family metallopeptidase, lysm peptidoglycan-binding domain-containing protein and oligopeptide transporter. The presence of these CSIs molecularly distinguishes this clade from other members of the family Coxiellaceae, further supporting the combination of the genera Rickettsiella and Diplorickettsia.

Additionally, three CSIs were identified as uniquely shared between Diplorickettsia, Rickettsiella and Coxiella, another genus belonging to the family Coxiellaceae. The absence of Aquicella species (the remaining genus within the family Coxiellaceae) from the shared CSIs suggests that the genera Coxiella, Diplorickettsia and Rickettsiella share a common ancestor exclusive of Aquicella.

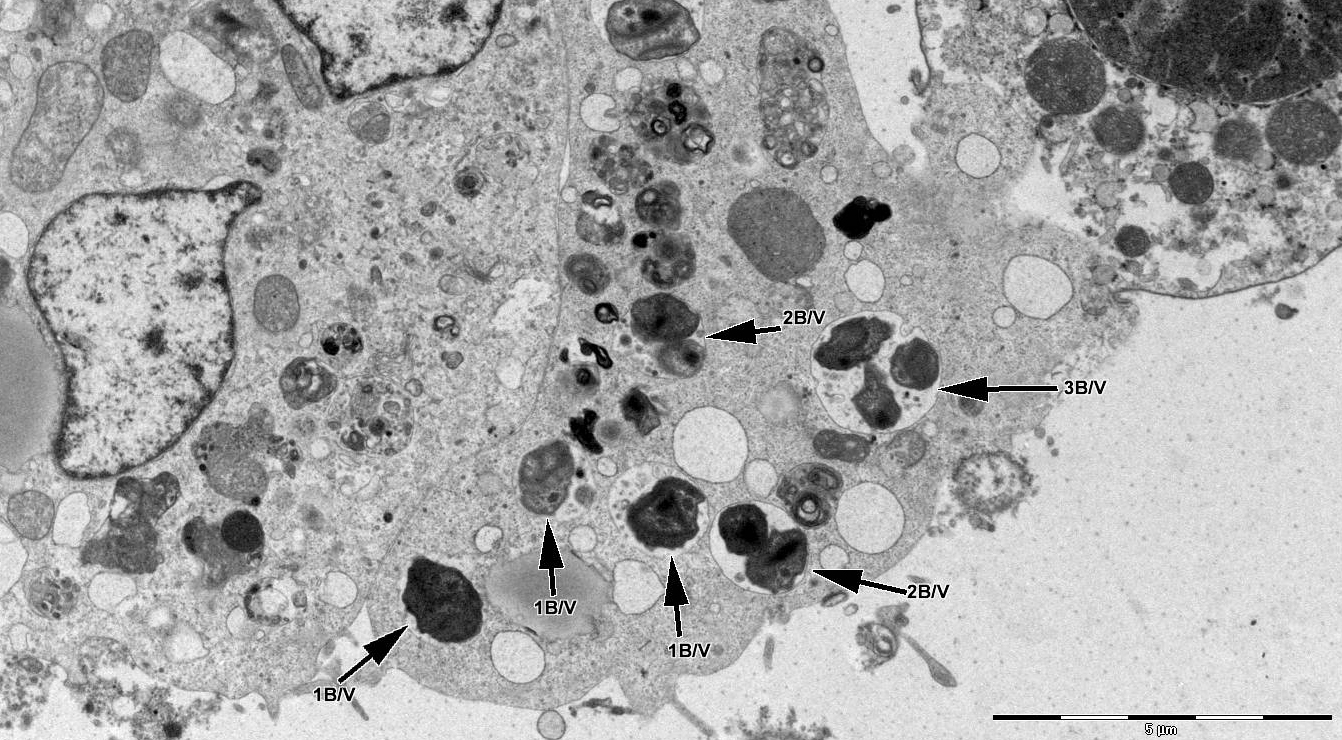
Diplorickettsia massiliensis Strain 20B bacteria grown in XTC-2 cells

== Culture and staining observations ==
Bacteria visualized in a rich culture established in XTC-2cell line by Gimenez staining appeared as intracellular red rods usually grouped in pairs but not connected with each other. Manual counting of bacteria in an unlysed eukaryotic cell showed that almost all bacteria (97%) were paired. The bacteria accumulated in the cytoplasm of cells but not in the nucleus. The maximum number of bacteria observed in one cell numbered over 100. Infected cells were often disrupted during centrifugation using a Cytospin (Thermo Shandon) centrifuge as revealed by subsequent staining. The isolate was Gram-negative when extracellular bacteria were stained.

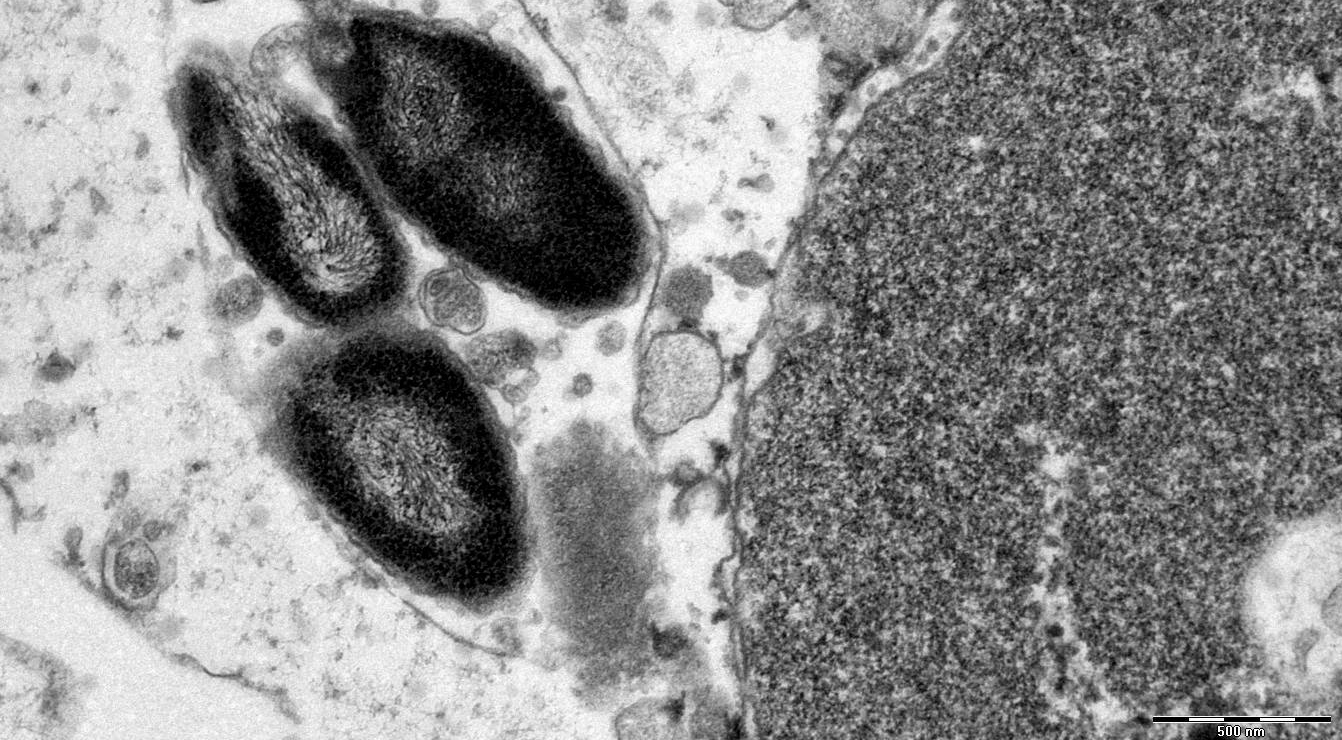
Diplorickettsia massiliensis Strain 20B visualization using transmission electron microscopy with uranyl acetate staining

In addition, Mediannikov et al. have examined the percentage of infected cells and the mean number of bacteria per cell in different cell lines. The highest growth speed and the presence of a cytopathogenic effect when bacteria were cultivated in XTC-2 cells (Xenopus laevis). A cytopathogenic effect, including cellular layer detachment and cell disruption, was observed 3–5 days after inoculation. It was the only cell line with 100% cells infected the mean number of bacteria per cell was more than 100 in all studied series. The growth speed and bacteria accumulation in cells were lower in cell lines of human origin (HEL and MRC5) cultivated at 32 °C but were minimal in mouse L929 cells.

Multiple attempts at cultivation of the bacteria in solid axenic media (both common and Legionella-specific) were not successful.

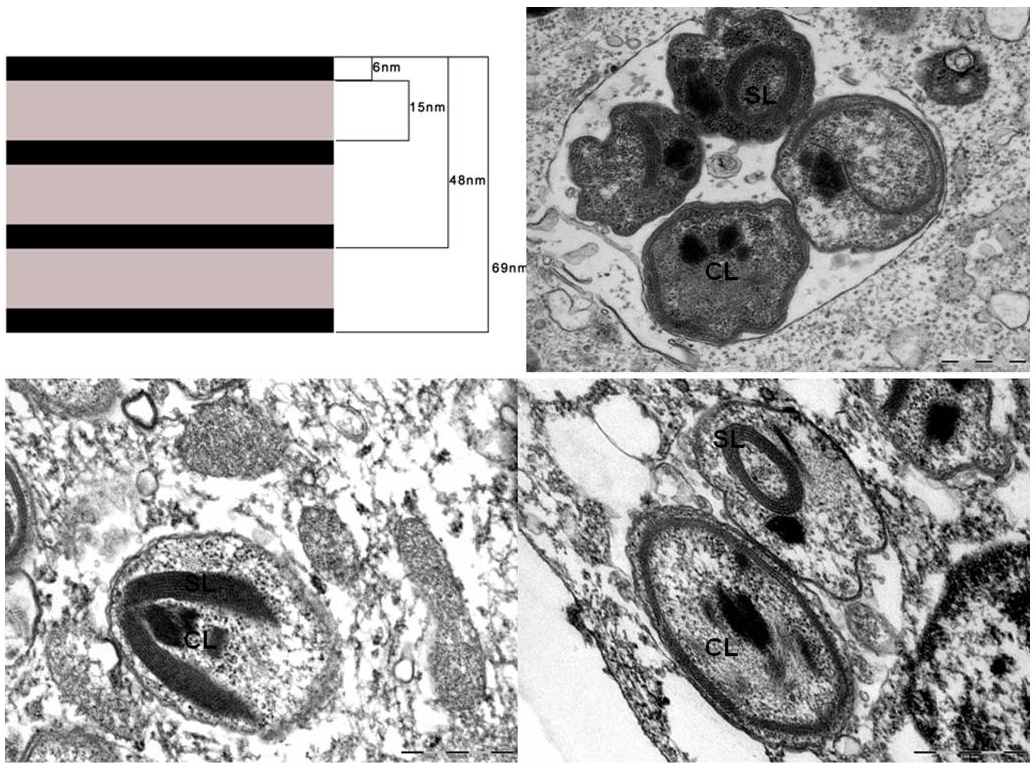
Internal structure of the bacteria using transmission electron microscopy

== Morphology by electron microscopy ==
Negative staining showed that the bacteria have an average length of 1540 nm (range: 848 to 3067 nm) and an average diameter of 695 nm (range: 515 to 992 nm). The longest bacteria were in the process of division. The bacteria of the strain 20B were harvested when they were extracellular for the studies of surface structures. Unlike other intracellular bacteria, including rickettsiae, 20B strain failed to highlight surface glycoproteins when colored with ruthenium red.

All bacteria observed intracellularly were located in vacuoles. Unlike Rickettsiella, they do not present a regular organization suggestive of crystalline structure. Based on visual impression of paired bacteria, they have counted the number of bacteria in vacuoles across the section: 51.4% of vacuoles contained 2 bacteria, 13.2% contained 3 or 4 bacteria, 1.7% contained more than 4, and 33.7% contained 1 bacterium. The ultrathin section may pass across only one bacterium in a vacuole that actually contains multiple bacteria, so this may mean that a number of these pseudo-single bacteria may be also paired. Taking these data into consideration, it was concluded that most bacteria are paired inside vacuoles. Bacteria in the process of division within the vacuoles were also found.

The internal structure of the bacteria was atypical. Electron-dense crystal-like structures were identified to be located in the center of almost all bacteria, usually surrounded by multilayer sheath-like structures. These layers alternate with electron-dense bands (6 nanometers) and light bands (15 nanometers). Up to seven electron-dense layers may be found in a single bacterium.
