= Barrie Marmion =

English microbiologist

Barrie Patrick Marmion AO (20 May 1920 – 12 July 2014) was an English microbiologist who spent the majority of his career in Australia. He is known for his work on Q fever, and led the team that developed the first vaccine against the bacteria that causes it.

== Early life ==
Barrie Marmion was born in 1920 in Alverstoke, Hampshire, to Joseph, a pharmacist, and Melita "Millie" Marmion. He began studying medicine at University College London in 1939 and, after a brief secondment to the Welsh National School of Medicine because of the war, graduated in 1944.

== Career ==
Marmion began his medical career at the Public Health Laboratory Service (PHLS) as a trainee in pathology; he was seconded in this position to Cambridge and Colindale, working in the virus reference laboratory at the latter. In 1951, he was awarded a Rockefeller Fellowship allowing him to travel to Melbourne, Australia, and work at the Walter and Eliza Hall Institute of Medical Research, where he studied Murray Valley encephalitis virus and respiratory viruses alongside Macfarlane Burnet. Marmion returned to the UK in 1952, joining Michael Stoker's Q fever research group at Cambridge University. He moved to Leeds as the head of the new PHLS virus laboratory in 1955. At Leeds, he published the first description of Q fever endocarditis and co-authored a paper with Leonard Hayflick identifying the cause of Mycoplasma pneumonia.

Marmion returned to Melbourne in 1963 as the Foundation Professor of Microbiology at the newly established Monash University Medical School. At Monash, he established the microbiology curriculum for medical students while researching Mycoplasma antigens and hepatitis A. He left Australia for the UK again in 1968 after accepting a role as the Robert Irvine Chair of Bacteriology at the University of Edinburgh. Shortly after he arrived in Edinburgh, he was involved in investigating an outbreak of hepatitis B in the local dialysis unit; he discovered that the high mortality was due to concurrent hepatitis C infection. This investigation laid the groundwork for the principles of bloodborne virus control that would later be applied to HIV.

In 1979, Marmion moved to Australia once again, this time as the senior director of medical virology at the Institute of Medical and Veterinary Science in Adelaide. He expanded the institute's diagnostic laboratory service and led a research group that was, at the time, a leader in virology research in Australia. Marmion's main research interest at this stage was Q fever; he spearheaded the development of Q-Vax, the first vaccine against Coxiella burnetii, the bacteria that causes Q fever. He observed that Q fever led to a post-viral illness and hypothesised that it could cause chronic fatigue syndrome.

== Honours ==
Marmion was made an Officer of the Order of Australia in 1994 and received the Gold Medal of the Royal College of Pathologists of Australasia. He chaired Australia's National Health and Medical Research Council for many years and served as president of the Australian Society for Microbiology from 1984 to 1986. He was a life member of the American Society for Rickettsiology and had a subspecies of Rickettsia honei, Rickettsia honei var. marmionii, named after him.
