= Dulaney Valley Memorial Gardens =

Cemetery and mausoleum in Timonium, Maryland, US

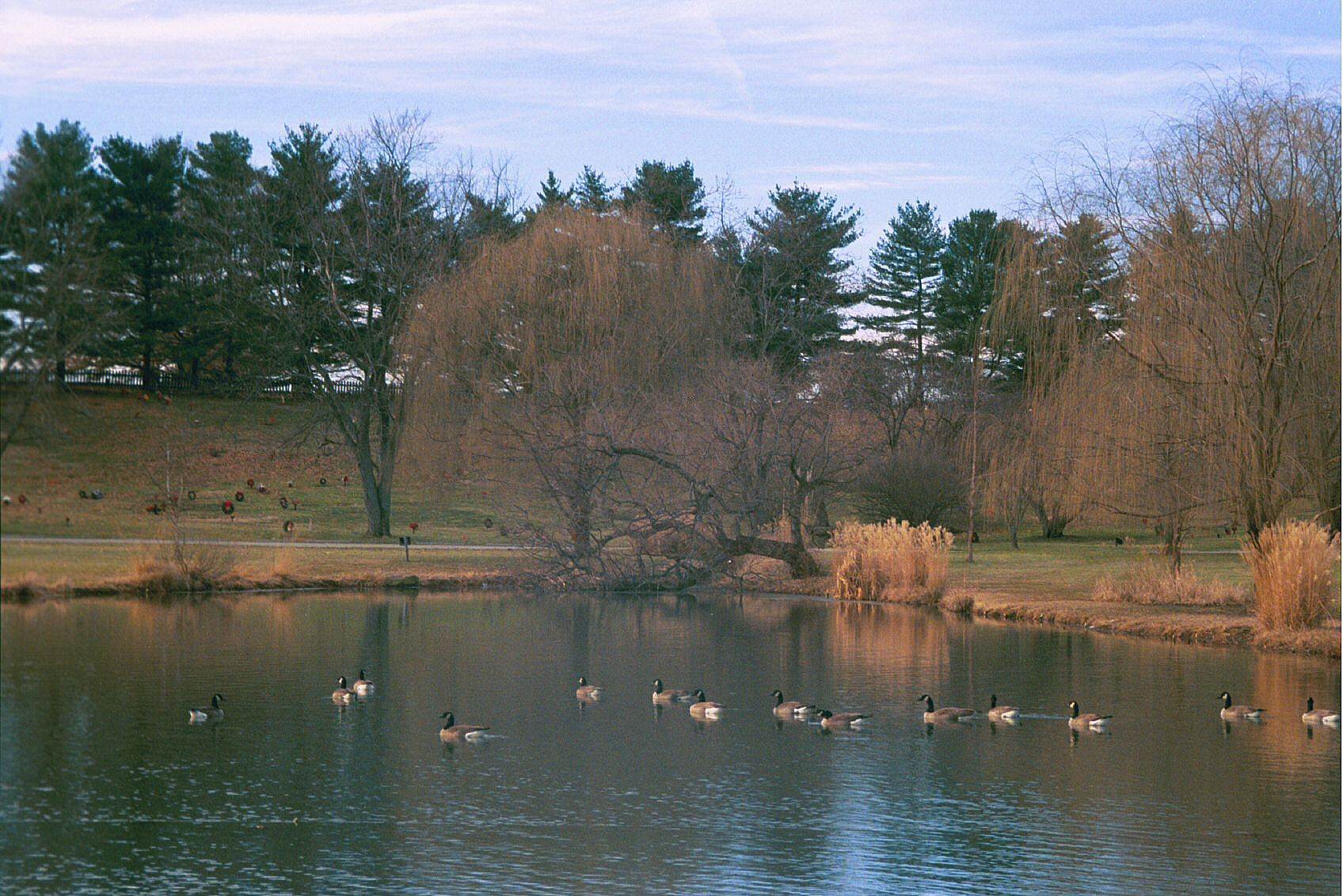
- Cemetery grounds and pond
- Interactive map of Dulaney Valley Memorial Gardens

Details
- Established: 1958
- Location: Timonium, Maryland
- Country: United States
- Coordinates: 39.4560°N 76.6165°W
- Type: Private
- Owned by: Mitchell-Wiedefeld Funeral Home corporation
- Size: 70-acre (28 ha)
- Website: https://www.dulaneyvalley.com/
- Find a Grave: Dulaney Valley Memorial Gardens

Dulaney Valley Memorial Gardens and Mausoleum is a cemetery and mausoleum in Timonium, Maryland, a Baltimore County suburban community. It is located at 200 E. Padonia Rd, about two miles (3 km) east from the Padonia Road exit off Interstate 83. The 7th and 6th holes of the Longview Golf Course border much of the cemetery; the other borders are Padonia Road and a residential neighborhood. The cemetery's administrative offices are directly across the street from the main entrance to the burial park. Another entrance leading to Gibbons Road is normally kept locked.

== History ==
Founded in 1958 by John Warfield Armiger Sr., the 70-acre (28 ha) cemetery was owned and managed by the Armiger family until July 17, 2007, when it was sold to Mitchell-Wiedefeld Funeral Home corporation. It averages 900 burials annually. Dulaney Valley Memorial Gardens has a large mausoleum and chapel with a number of stained glass windows.

The cemetery has a Fallen Heroes section and memorial tableau, dedicated to police officers and firefighters from the local area who were killed in the line of duty and interred there at no charge. The cemetery holds a "Fallen Heroes Day" commemoration each May with an invited speaker.

There is also a Field of Honor surmounted by a circle of flags for deceased military veterans. Dedicated on National Flag Day, June 14, 1967, the tribute is supported by the American Legion and other veterans' groups. An annual Memorial Day ceremony with invited dignitaries attracts large crowds there.

== Notable burials ==
Notables interred at Dulaney Valley Memorial Gardens include:

- Spiro Agnew, Vice President of the United States and Governor of Maryland
- Art Donovan, National Football League player and member, Pro Football Hall of Fame
- Paul Fiset, microbiologist and developer of the Q fever vaccine
- Irv Hall, Major League Baseball player
- Pat Kelly, Major League All-Star baseball player
- G. E. Lowman, international radio evangelist
- Don McCafferty, National Football League player and coach
- William Donald Schaefer, Mayor of Baltimore, Governor of Maryland, and Comptroller of Maryland
- Johnny Unitas, Baltimore Colts Pro Football Hall of Famer

There is also a cenotaph in memory of former Comptroller of Maryland Louis L. Goldstein, who is interred at Wesley Cemetery in Prince Frederick, Maryland.

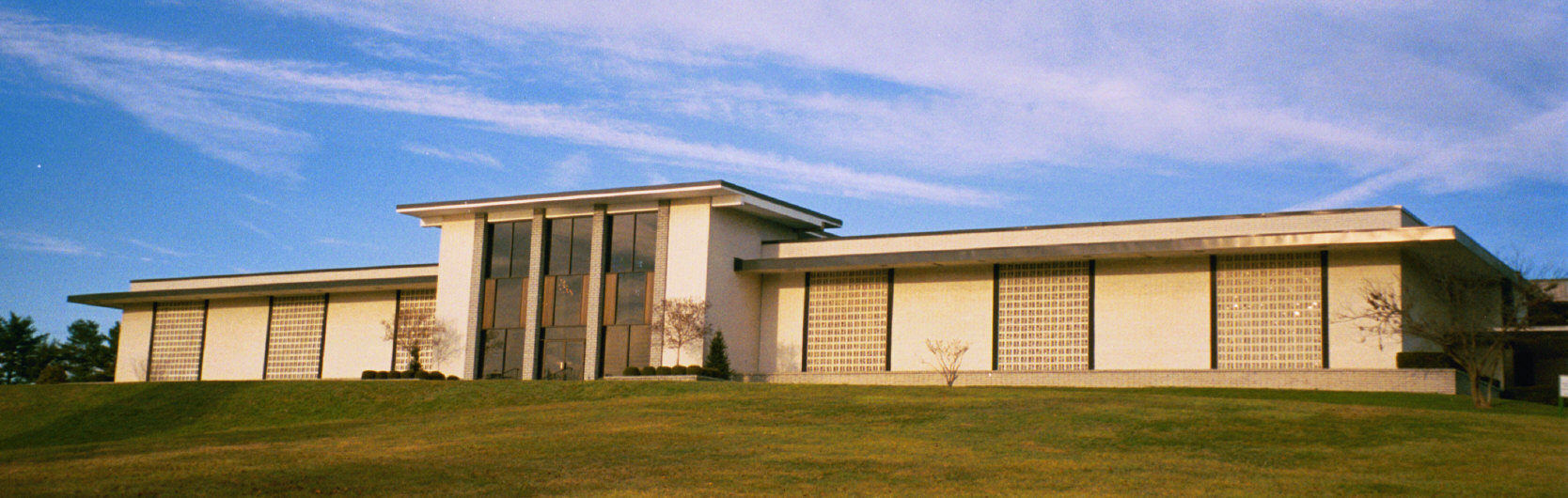
The Mausoleum

== See also ==
- List of burial places of presidents and vice presidents of the United States
