= Paul Fiset =

Canadian-American microbiologist (1922–2001)

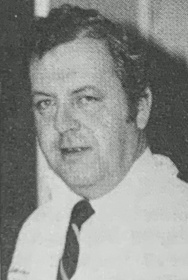
- Paul Fiset on the Armed Forces Epidemiological Board (1965–1976)
- Born: Paul Fiset; November 7, 1922; Quebec, Canada
- Died: February 27, 2001 (aged 78); Baltimore, Maryland, U.S.
- Resting place: Dulaney Valley Memorial Gardens, Timonium, Maryland
- Education: Laval University (MD, 1949); Cambridge University (PhD, 1956)
- Known for: Q fever vaccine
- Spouse: Marie Lorraine Gosselin Fiset (m. 1953)
- Awards: Outstanding Civilian Service Award (1972)
- Scientific career
- Fields: Medical research Microbiology
- Workplaces: Rochester School of Medicine and Dentistry; University of Maryland School of Medicine (1964–1989)

Paul Fiset (English pronunciation: Fih-ZAY; November 7, 1922 – February 27, 2001) was a Canadian-American microbiologist and virologist. His research helped to develop one of the first successful Q fever vaccines, noted by The New York Times. Fiset was born in Quebec, Canada, and attended Laval University, where he earned a Doctor of Medicine degree in 1949. He subsequently attended Cambridge University, where he received a PhD degree in 1956. As a professor at the University of Maryland School of Medicine, he also researched other bacterial diseases such as typhus and Rocky Mountain spotted fever, in addition to Q fever.

== Early life and education ==
Born in Quebec, Fiset attended high school at the Collège François-de-Laval (formerly called the Petit Séminaire de Québec) in Quebec City. He earned his bachelor's degree in humanities and general sciences from Laval University in 1944 and his Doctor of Medicine degree there in 1949. Fiset's residency was at St. Sacrement University Hospital in Quebec. He also did additional postgraduate work at the Pasteur Institute in Paris, France, and the National Institute for Medical Research in London. Fiset later earned a PhD in virology at Cambridge University between 1953 and 1956.

== Career ==
After earning his Ph.D., Fiset began teaching in the U.S. at the Rochester School of Medicine and Dentistry in New York. In 1964, he joined the faculty at the University of Maryland School of Medicine in Baltimore as an associate professor, becoming a U.S. citizen the following year. Fiset became a full professor there in 1975.

Fiset served the Commission on Rickettsial Diseases of the U.S. Armed Forces Epidemiological Board from 1965 to 1976. He was a consultant to the Surgeon General of the United States, for which he received the Outstanding Civilian Service Award in 1972. Between 1987 and 1989, Fiset was chairman of the Department of Microbiology and Immunology at the University of Maryland School of Medicine.

== Research ==
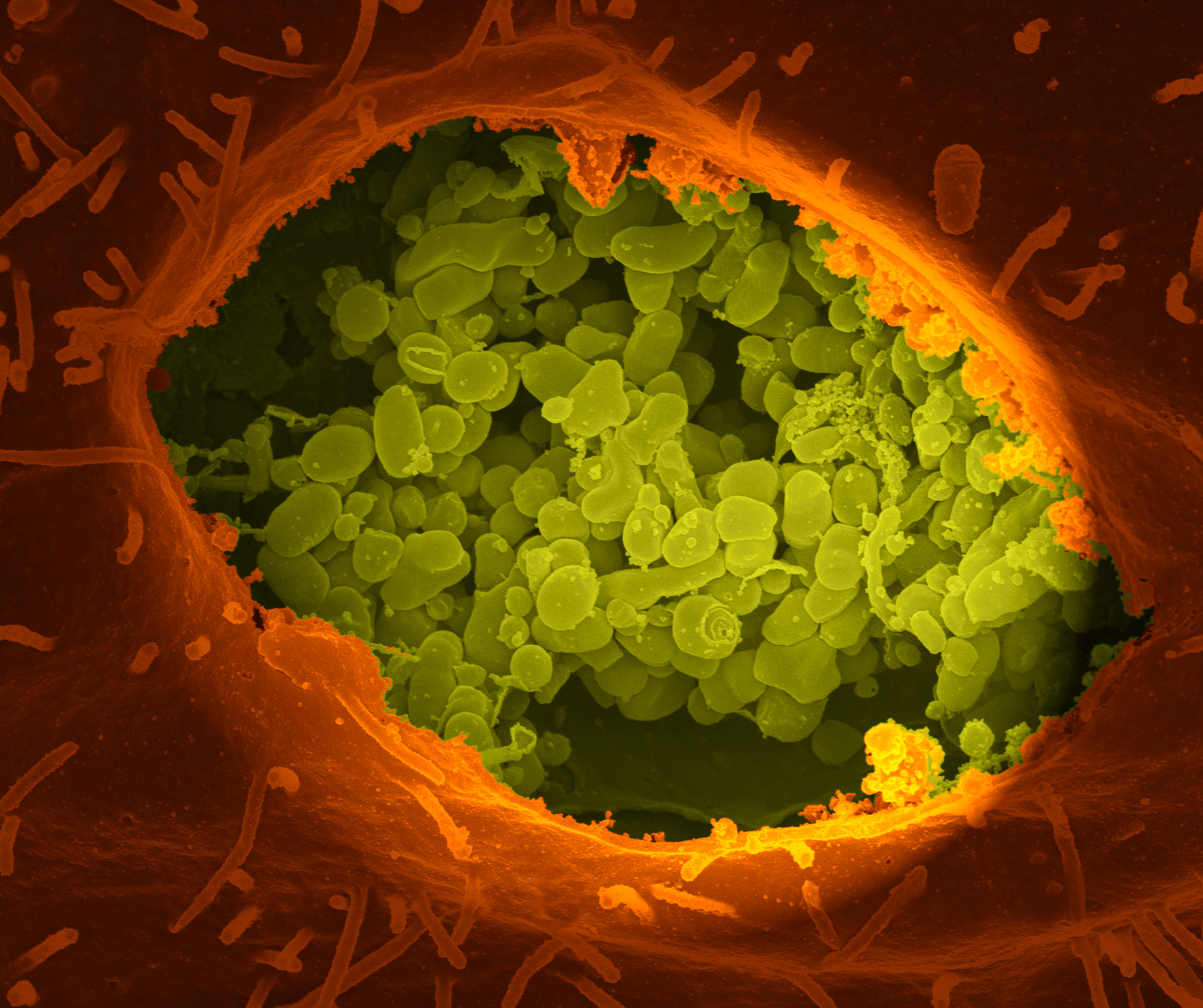
Coxiella burnetii bacteria that causes Q fever

In 1951, Fiset and others wrote in the Canadian Medical Association Journal of their research into three cases of bronchopulmonary candidosis. While working on his doctorate in virology at Clare College, Cambridge University between 1953 and 1956, Fiset worked to decode the structure of Coxiella burnetii, the bacteria causing Q fever, with Michael Stoker. The infection typically presents symptoms such as high fever, headaches, and severe muscle aches and pains which can last for several weeks. His subsequent research as a professor at the Rochester School of Medicine and Dentistry and University of Maryland School of Medicine led to development of the Q fever vaccine with Australian microbiologist Barry Marmion. Theodore Woodward, writing for the Armed Forces Epidemiological Board, said that an "important and better understanding of Q fever resulted from the work of Dr. Paul Fiset, who showed that Q fever Rickettsiae could wear several faces, called Phase I and Phase II, a change that was important for vaccine development and accurate diagnosis". The vaccine resulted in a protection rate of 95 percent.

In addition to writing extensively about his research into Coxiella burnetii, Fiset also researched typhus and Rocky Mountain spotted fever at the University of Maryland School of Medicine. In 1978, he collaborated in the research of a Rocky Mountain Spotted Fever case resulting from a blood transfusion. As reported in the Journal of the American Medical Association, the peer-reviewed study said the recipient's diagnosis was confirmed "by positive serologic reactions and isolation of Rickettsia rickettsii from blood after inoculation in animals and tissue culture".

Following a 1979 outbreak of Q fever in California, Fiset conducted a two-year serological testing program at the National Institutes of Health Animal Center.

== Personal life ==
In the 1960s to 1980s, Fiset made his home in Hampton, Maryland, with his wife, Marie Lorraine Fiset (née Gosselin), whom he married in 1953 while both were studying microbiology at the Pasteur Institute in Paris, France. They had a son, Peter, and two daughters, Lauren and Clare. Fiset was an active volunteer with the Boy Scouts of America in the early 1970s, serving as chairman of his son's Scout troop. The couple moved to nearby May's Chapel in 1982.

Fiset died of heart failure in Baltimore at age 78 on February 27, 2001. He is interred at Dulaney Valley Memorial Gardens in Timonium, Maryland.

== Honors and recognition ==
- 1972, Outstanding Civilian Service Award, U.S. Army
- 1989, Professor Emeritus, University of Maryland School of Medicine

== Published works ==
Fiset wrote extensively of his research findings. His most cited article is:

- Stoker MG, Fiset P. "Phase variation of the Nine Mile and other strains of Rickettsia burneti". Canadian Journal of Microbiology. (May 1956) vol.2, number 3, pp. 310–21. According to Google Scholar, it has been cited 210 times as of May 2021.

Among his other published writings are:

- "Phase variation of Rickettsia (Coxiella) burneti: Study of the antibody response in guinea pigs and rabbits" (1957)
- "Serological diagnosis, strain identification and antigenic variation: Symposium on Q fever", Walter Reed Army Inst. (1959)
- "Serum Inhibitors of Asian Strains of Influenza Virus", Nature (1959)
- "Purification of Psittacosis Agent with Anion Exchange Cellulose–'Ecteola'", Nature (1963)
- "Interaction of Rickettsiae and Phagocytic Host Cells", The Journal of Immunology (October 1, 1967)
- "Vaccination against Q fever", 1st International Conference on Vaccines against Viral and Rickettsial Diseases of Man (1967)
- "The antibody response to antigens to Coxiella burnetii" (1968)
- "Rickettsiae and Rickettsial Diseases" (1968)
- "A microagglutination technique for detection and measurement of rickettsial antibodies" (1969)
- "An antigenic comparison of strains of Coxiella burnetii" (1971)
- "Immunologic evidence of human fetal infection with Coxiella burnetii" (1975)
