= Inositol monophosphatase 3 =

Protein-coding gene in the species Homo sapiens

BPNT2

Identifiers
- Aliases: BPNT2, GPAPP, IMP 3, IMP-3, IMPA3, inositol monophosphatase domain containing 1, IMPAD1, 3'(2'), 5'-bisphosphate nucleotidase 2
- External IDs: OMIM: 614010; MGI: 1915720; GeneCards: BPNT2
Enzyme activity
EC #	BRENDA	ExPASy	KEGG	MetaCyc
3.1.3.7	↗	↗	↗	↗

Gene location (Human)
Chr.	Chromosome 8 (human)
Band	8q12.1	Start	56,957,931 bp
Band	8q12.1	End	56,993,867 bp

Gene location (Mouse)
Chr.	Chromosome 4 (mouse)
Band	4|4 A1	Start	4,762,484 bp
Band	4|4 A1	End	4,793,355 bp
RNA expression pattern
Bgee	Human / Mouse (ortholog); Top expressed in: internal globus pallidus; right ventricle; subthalamic nucleus; vena cava; pons; saphenous vein; external globus pallidus; middle temporal gyrus; lateral nuclear group of thalamus; parotid gland / Top expressed in: Rostral migratory stream; epithelium of stomach; lateral septal nucleus; ventromedial nucleus; epithelium of lens; human fetus; migratory enteric neural crest cell; crypt of lieberkuhn of small intestine; lateral hypothalamus; retinal pigment epithelium; More reference expression data
BioGPS	n/a
Gene ontology
Molecular function	inositol monophosphate 1-phosphatase activity; inositol monophosphate 4-phosphatase activity; hydrolase activity; inositol monophosphate phosphatase activity; metal ion binding; inositol monophosphate 3-phosphatase activity; 3'-nucleotidase activity; 3'(2'),5'-bisphosphate nucleotidase activity
Cellular component	integral component of membrane; membrane; Golgi apparatus; nucleus; cytosol; nuclear body; Golgi lumen
Biological process	skeletal system development; chondrocyte development; embryonic digit morphogenesis; phosphatidylinositol phosphate biosynthetic process; chondroitin sulfate metabolic process; endochondral ossification; post-embryonic development; inositol biosynthetic process; dephosphorylation; 3'-phosphoadenosine 5'-phosphosulfate metabolic process
Sources:Amigo / QuickGO
Orthologs
Databases	NCBI: entry; OMA: entry
Species	Human	Mouse
Entrez	54928	242291
Ensembl	ENSG00000104331	ENSMUSG00000066324
UniProt	Q9NX62	Q80V26
RefSeq (mRNA)	NM_017813	NM_177730
RefSeq (protein)	NP_060283	NP_808398
Location (UCSC)	Chr 8: 56.96 – 56.99 Mb	Chr 4: 4.76 – 4.79 Mb
PubMed search
- Wikidata
View/Edit Human	View/Edit Mouse

Inositol monophosphatase 3 also known as inositol monophosphatase domain-containing protein 1 (IMPAD1) is an enzyme that in humans is encoded by the IMPAD1 gene.

This gene encodes a member of the inositol monophosphatase family. The encoded protein is localized to the Golgi apparatus and catalyzes the hydrolysis of phosphoadenosine phosphate (PAP) to adenosine monophosphate (AMP).

== Clinical significance ==
Mutations in this gene are a cause of GRAPP type chondrodysplasia with joint dislocations, and a pseudogene of this gene is located on the long arm of chromosome 1.
