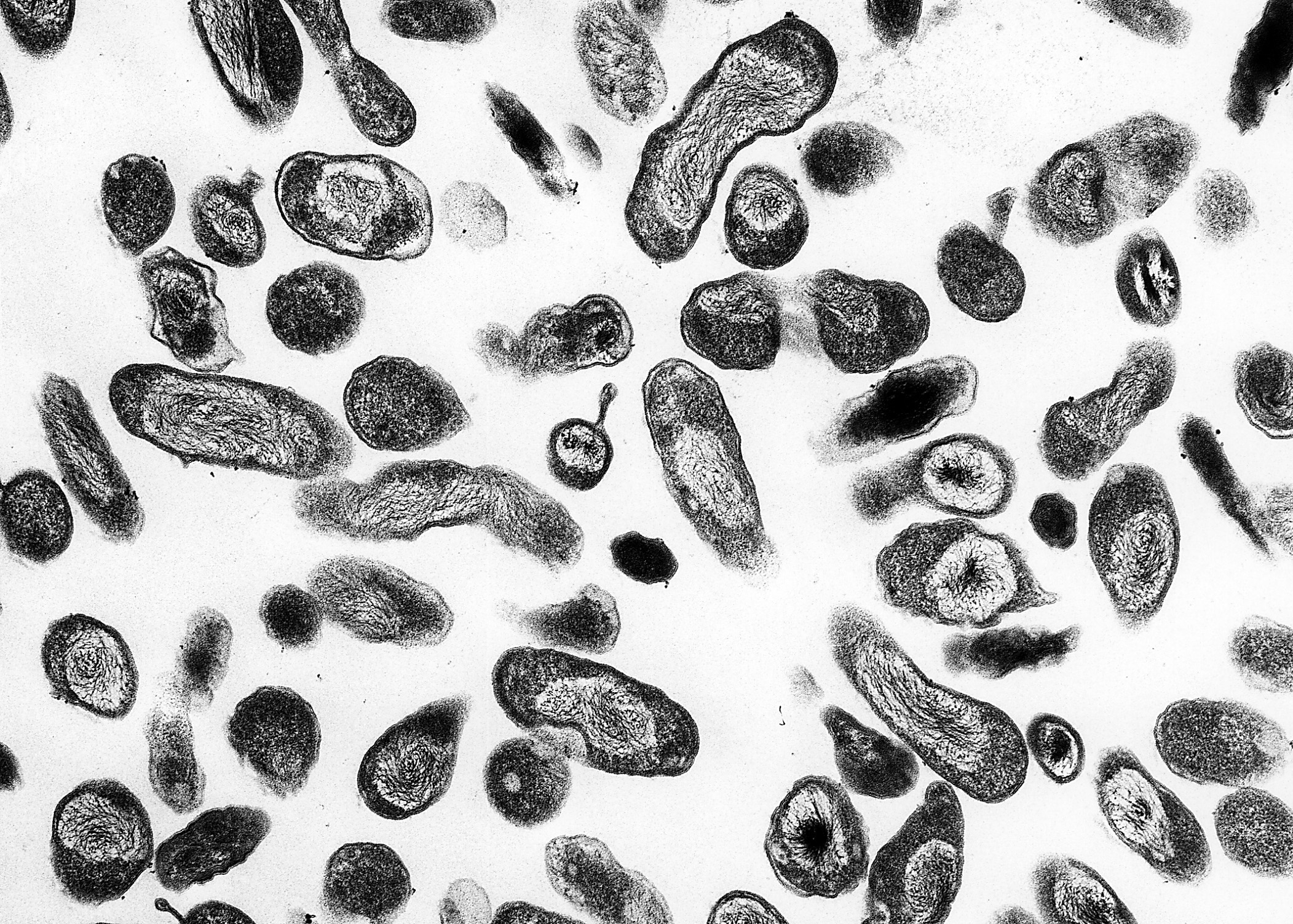
- Coxiella burnetii, the causative agent of Q fever

Scientific classification
- Domain: Bacteria
- Kingdom: Pseudomonadati
- Phylum: Pseudomonadota
- Class: Gammaproteobacteria
- Order: Legionellales
- Family: Coxiellaceae

Genera
- Aquicella; Coxiella; Diplorickettsia; Rickettsiella "Ca. Berkiella"

= Coxiellaceae =

Family of bacteria

The Coxiellaceae are a family in the order Legionellales.

Coxiella burnetii is the best-described species in this group.

The bacterium Rickettsiella melolonthae was initially assigned to the Coxiellaceae, but is considered part of the Diplorickettsiaceae (a closely related lineage of Gammaproteobacteria) based on recent phylogenomic reconstructions.

Various other Coxiellaceae lineages have so-far evaded cultivation efforts but have been characterized through culture-independent genomics and are present in both freshwater and diverse marine environments, likely with a host-associated lifestyle similar to that of Coxiella burnetti.
