= H. R. Cox =

American bacteriologist

Dr. Herald Rea Cox
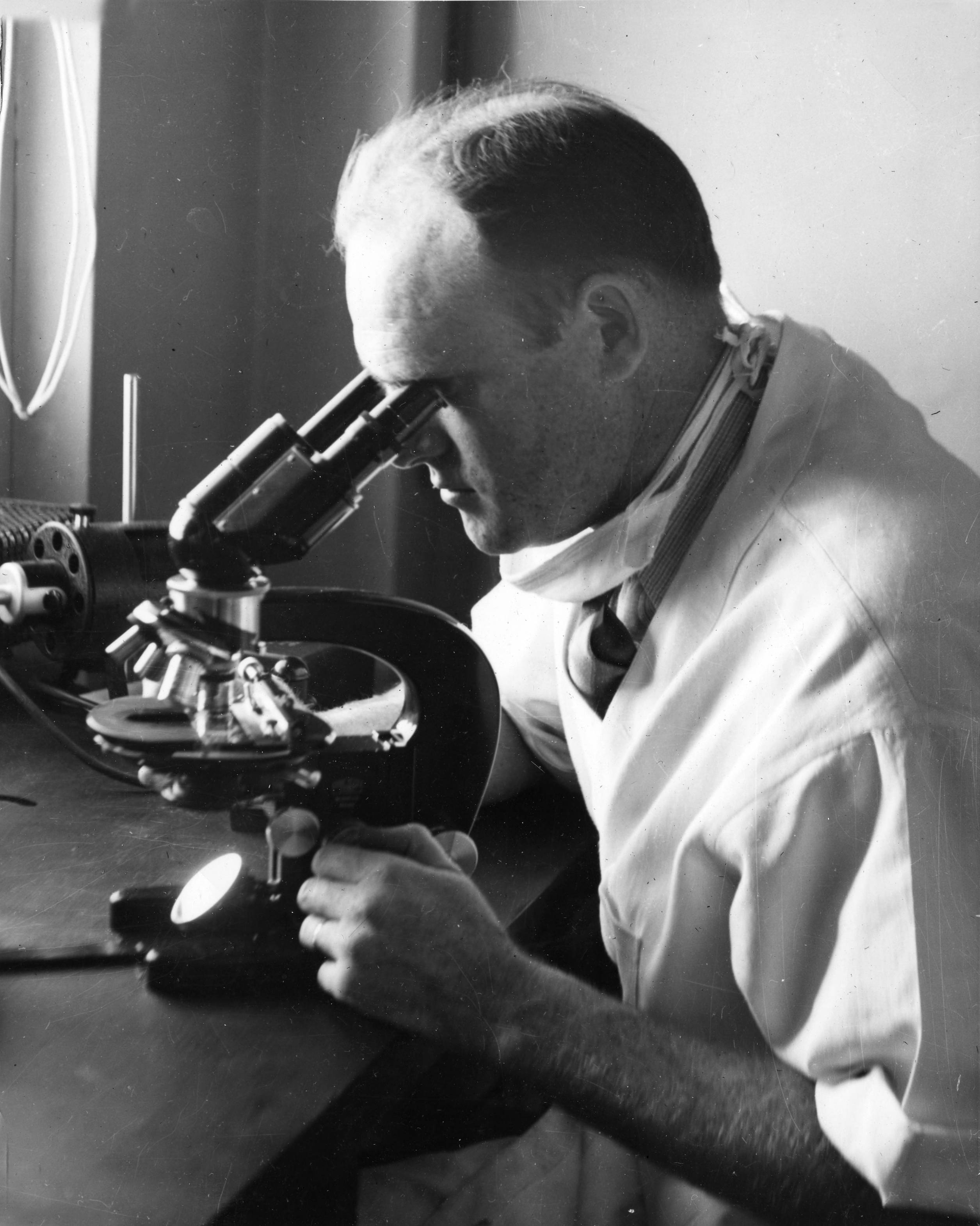
- H. R. Cox using microscope in 1938
- Born: Terre Haute, Indiana
- Education: Indiana State Normal School
- Scientific career
- Fields: Bacteriology
- Workplaces: Rocky Mountain Laboratory in Hamilton, Montana Lederle Laboratories Roswell Park Comprehensive Cancer Center

Herald Rea Cox (1907–1986) was an American bacteriologist. The bacterial family Coxiellaceae and the genus Coxiella, which include the organism that causes Q fever, are named after him.

== Biography ==
Born in Terre Haute, Indiana, he graduated from Indiana State Normal School, now Indiana State University, in 1928 before obtaining his doctorate from the Johns Hopkins Bloomberg School of Public Health.

In the 1930s, Cox joined the U.S. Public Health Service as Principal Bacteriologist at the Rocky Mountain Laboratory in Hamilton, Montana. While there, he studied rickettsia, a group of organisms that causes Rocky Mountain spotted fever and typhus. In 1938, he discovered that rickettsia could be grown in fertile egg membranes, which led to the development of vaccines to combat Rocky Mountain spotted fever and vaccines for several strains of typhus.

The family Coxiellaceae and the genus Coxiella, which contain the organism that causes Q fever, are named for Cox.

In 1942, Cox became head of the Virus and Rickettsial Research Department at Lederle Laboratories in New York. At that time, public health attention focused on finding a vaccine for polio. Cox was one of many researchers competing to find a breakthrough, which is generally credited to Jonas Salk (1952). Although Cox's egg technique was in widespread use by 1943, it had not been successful for polio. In 1947, John Franklin Enders and others demonstrated that monkey tissue provided a suitable medium to grow the virus in the lab. Salk employed the Enders method, incubating the virus using rhesus monkey kidneys and testicles. Cox eschewed the technique because of the danger monkey virus represented. In October, 1952, Cox reported that he had grown the Lansing strain of polio virus in fertile hens' eggs, and in 1961, he announced an oral polio vaccine. Meanwhile, human trials of Albert Sabin's successful oral vaccine had begun in 1957, and it would be licensed for general use in 1961.

Within Lederle Laboratories, Cox competed with co-worker Hilary Koprowski, as each had developed a successful polio vaccine.

Cox left from Lederle in 1972 to join Roswell Park Comprehensive Cancer Center (then known as Roswell Park Memorial Institute), as the director of cancer research, where he worked on cancer immunology.

== Honors ==
- 1940: Theobald Smith Award, American Association for the Advancement of Science (for Rocky Mountain Spotted Fever vaccine)
- 1942: Doctor of Science, University of Montana
- 1946: Typhus Commission Medal
- 1951: Ricketts Award
- 1958: Distinguished Alumni Award, Indiana State University
- 1961: President, American Society for Microbiology
- 1971: Honorary Member, Society of American Bacteriologists, American Society for Microbiology

== Archived papers ==
- American Society for Microbiology Archives
