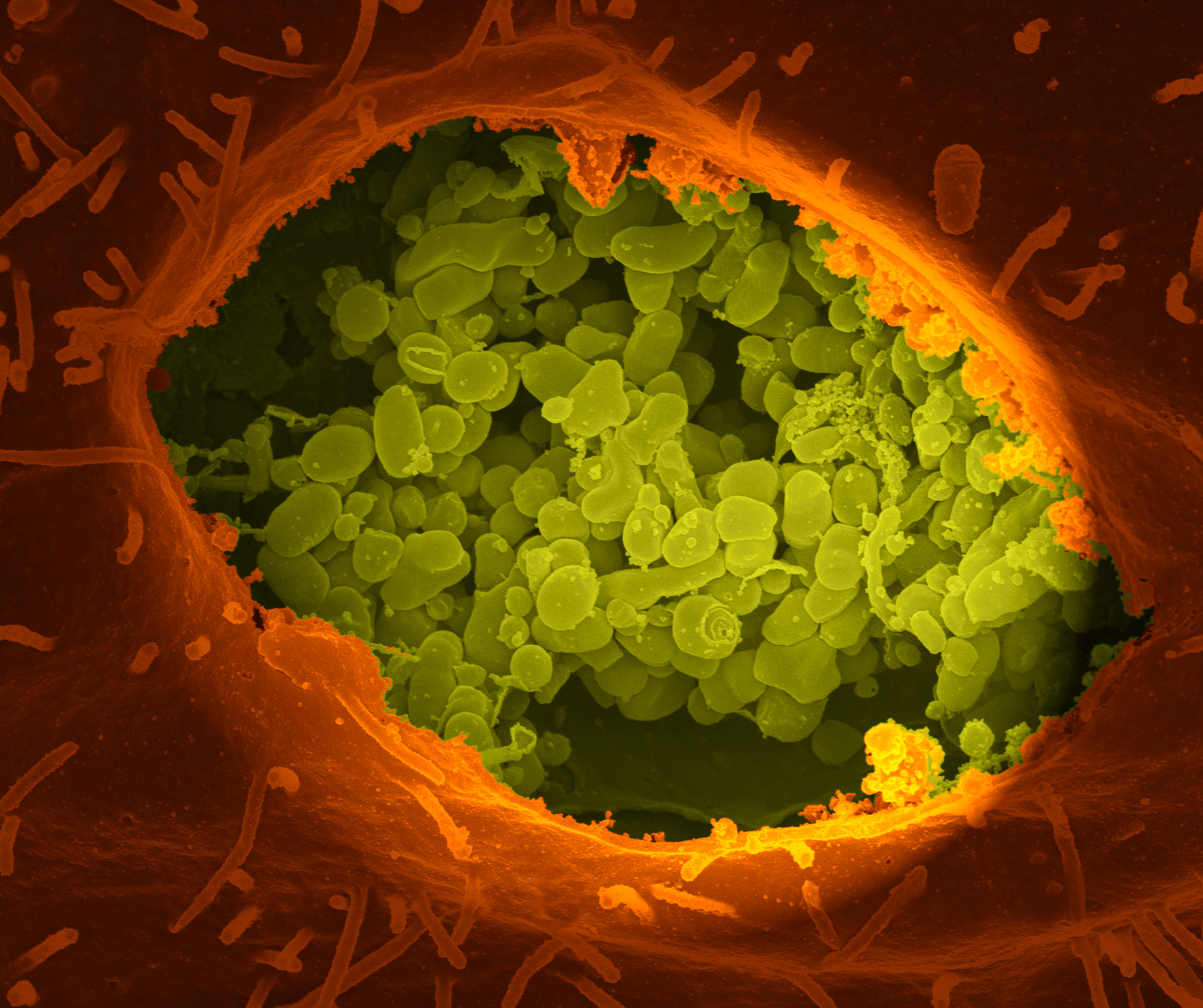
- A dry fracture of a Vero cell exposing the contents of a vacuole where Coxiella burnetii is growing

Scientific classification
- Domain: Bacteria
- Kingdom: Pseudomonadati
- Phylum: Pseudomonadota
- Class: Gammaproteobacteria
- Order: Legionellales
- Family: Coxiellaceae
- Genus: Coxiella
- Species: C. burnetii

Binomial name
- Coxiella burnetii (Derrick 1939); Philip 1948

= Coxiella burnetii =

Species of bacterium

Coxiella burnetii is a gram-negative, obligate intracellular bacterial pathogen (a type of bacterium that lives inside the cells of its host) and the causative agent of Q fever. Although it was historically grouped with Rickettsia because of similar cell morphology, genetic and physiological studies show that C. burnetii is distinct and belongs to the class Gammaproteobacteria, and it is currently the only confirmed species within the genus Coxiella. The bacterium is a small coccobacillus with a unique ability to survive in extremely harsh environmental conditions. It forms a highly resistant small-cell variant (SCV) as part of a two-stage developmental cycle, which alternates with a metabolically active large-cell variant (LCV) that replicates inside host cells. These adaptations allow C. burnetii to survive common disinfectants and to persist within host cells, including in harsh environments such as the acidic phagolysosome.

== History and naming ==
Coxiella burnetii was discovered in the 1930s through separate studies conducted in Montana, United States, and Queensland, Australia. Definitive descriptions of the pathogen were published later in the decade by Edward Holbrook Derrick and Macfarlane Burnet in Australia, and by Herald Rea Cox and Gordon Davis at the Rocky Mountain Laboratory (RML) in the United States.

The RML team initially proposed the name Rickettsia diaporica, derived from the Greek word meaning "passing through", in reference to the organism's ability to pass through bacterial filters. Around the same time, Edward Derrick suggested the name Rickettsia burnetii to recognize Macfarlane Burnet's contribution in identifying the agent as a rickettsial organism. As later research demonstrated that the species differed significantly from other rickettsiae, it was reassigned to a new subgenus, Coxiella. In 1948, Cornelius B. Philip, another RML researcher, promoted it to full genus status as Coxiella burnetii, honoring both Cox and Burnet.

C. burnetii is now placed within the order Legionellales, and one of its closest known human-pathogenic relatives is Legionella pneumophila, the causative agent of Legionnaires' disease.

The first effective Q fever vaccine was developed in the 1960s–1970s through a collaboration between American microbiologist Richard Ormsbee and Australian infectious diseases physician Barrie Marmion.

Coxiella was historically difficult to study because it could not be grown outside a host. In 2009, researchers established an axenic (host-free) culture system that allowed C. burnetii to be grown in cell-free media, enabling more detailed molecular biology studies.

== Pathogenesis ==
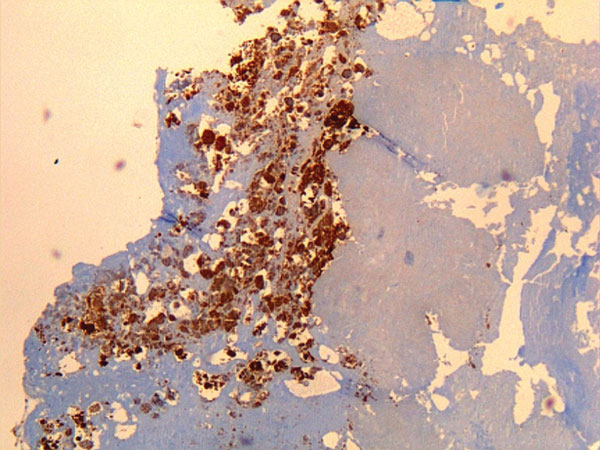
Immunohistochemical detection of C. burnetii in resected cardiac valve of a 60-year-old man with Q fever endocarditis, Cayenne, French Guiana, monoclonal antibody against C. burnetii and hematoxylin were used for staining: Original magnification ×50

=== Virulence and infectious dose ===
Of the many C. burnetii isolates, several strains are now used most often in research because they are well-characterized and widely available. The Nine Mile phase I strain remains the standard reference strain for genetic and virulence studies. In addition, the Guiana strain has also become an important focus of recent research because it is more virulent in animal models than the Nine Mile strain. In recent years, additional strains have been examined, broadening the diversity of isolates used in research. However, virulence can vary across host species, and murine rodents often require higher bacterial doses to establish infection in laboratory experiments.

The median infectious dose (ID_{50}), the number of organisms required to infect 50% of exposed individuals, is estimated to be as low as a single bacterium when inhaled. This represents an extremely low infectious dose (approximately 1 to 10 organisms), making Coxiella burnetii one of the most infectious bacterial pathogens known. The disease occurs in two stages: an acute phase characterized by fever, chills, and respiratory symptoms, and a chronic phase that develops more slowly and may involve endocarditis or hepatitis.

=== Cellular entry and infection mechanism ===
C. burnetii infections begin in the alveoli of the lungs. Upon inhalation, the bacterium targets alveolar macrophages and enters through actin-dependent phagocytosis. After initial binding, it may enter non-professional phagocytes via an active zipper mechanism. C. burnetii exploits the αVβ3 integrin receptor to enter host cells via actin- and RAC1-dependent phagocytosis, a process believed to help the pathogen avoid triggering inflammatory responses.

=== Intracellular survival and development ===
Following infection, C. burnetii undergoes a biphasic developmental cycle that alternates between two morphological forms: the small-cell variant (SCV) and the large-cell variant (LCV). The SCV is metabolically dormant and highly resistant to environmental stressors, making it the form most likely responsible for initiating natural infection.

After entry into a host cell, SCVs are taken up into a phagosome that matures through the endocytic pathway. In the first few hours after infection, the compartment merges with endosomes, autophagosomes, and lysosomes containing acid phosphatase picking up acidic hydrolases and lysosomal proteins along the way. The acidic environment inside the vacuole triggers the SCVs to transform into the metabolically active LCVs, which are then able to replicate within the C. burnetii-containing vacuole (CCV).

At this stage, C. burnetii becomes metabolically active and synthesizes a type IV secretion system (T4SS) which translocates effector proteins into the host cytoplasm to manipulate host cell functions. After approximately six days, the bacterium transitions back to the SCV form to prepare for persistence and extracellular release.

=== Type IVB secretion system ===
The bacteria use a type IVB secretion system known as Icm/Dot (intracellular multiplication / defect in organelle trafficking genes) to inject over 100 effector proteins into the host. These effectors increase the bacterium's ability to survive and replicate within host cells by modulating multiple host pathways, including blocking apoptosis, inhibiting immune responses, and altering vesicle trafficking. In Legionella pneumophila, a related Gammaproteobacterium that uses the same secretion system, these effectors enhance survival by preventing fusion of the bacteria-containing vacuole with degradative endosomes.

=== Treatment and prevention ===
Acute Q fever is typically treated with doxycycline, which shortens illness duration and reduces the risk of progression to chronic disease. Other antibiotics, including macrolides, co-trimoxazole, quinolones, and beta-lactams, have been used but show less consistent effectiveness. Serologic tests may not become positive until 1–2 weeks after exposure, so the CDC recommends initiating doxycycline based on clinical suspicion rather than waiting for laboratory confirmation.

In livestock, parts of the European Union authorize vaccination using Coxevac (a phase I killed C. burnetii vaccine) on goats to reduce the risk of abortion and C. burnetii transfer through vaginal fluids, feces, and milk. It is also used for the treatment of C. burnetii infection in cattle. The effects of the vaccine are most pronounced in goats when vaccinated before their first pregnancy.

Chronic Q fever, particularly endocarditis, requires prolonged combination therapy. The most effective regimen is doxycycline with hydroxychloroquine for at least 18 months, and patients undergoing treatment require long-term serologic monitoring to ensure clearance of infection and detect relapse.

Q-Vax is an inactivated whole-cell phase I vaccine that provides long-lasting protection, but it is licensed only in Australia and is not approved for use in the United States.

== Prevalence and host ==
Coxiella burnetii is a globally distributed microbe (excluding New Zealand and Antarctica) found commonly in domestic reservoirs such as sheep, goats, and cattle. The microbe is spread to other organisms through the inhalation of contaminated aerosols. It presents asymptomatically in animals, and proves to cause chronic disease in nearby humans. The microbe is spread from domestic animals to human hosts during parturition or slaughter of the domestic animal. Ticks can spread the microbe across generations of livestock through transovarial transmission. Other insects such as flies, cockroaches, and lice can also act as reservoirs.

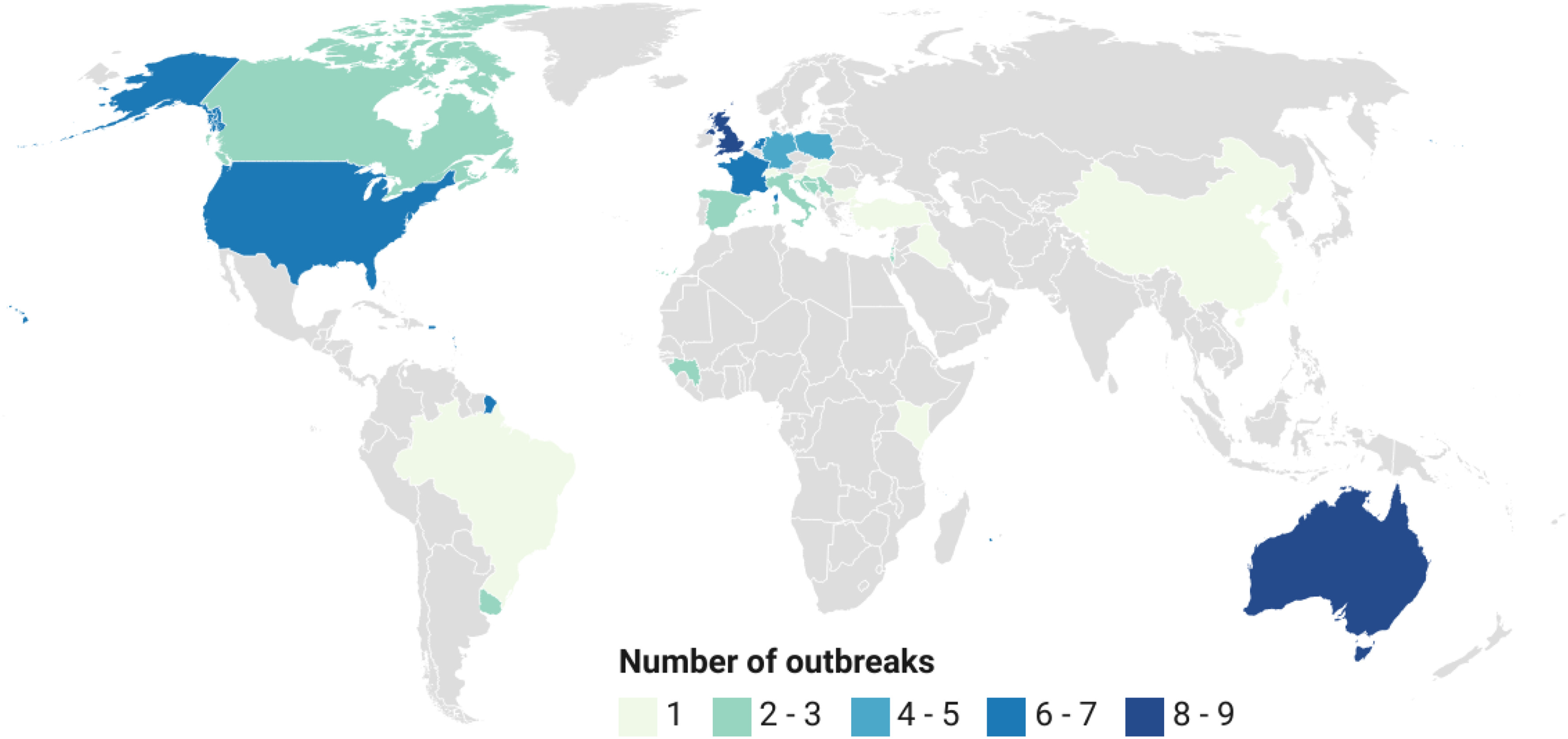
Map of global distribution patterns of reported Q fever outbreaks in 2024

Q fever is present in German human populations with 27-100 cases reported annually. It is estimated to affect 50 per every 100,000 inhabitants annually in France. The UK has faced 904 cases between 2000 and 2015, as well as major outbreaks in 2002 and 2007. Italy has experienced two different outbreaks of human infection in Como prison and Vicenza respectively. Spain has a high prevalence of C. burnetii infection in human populations in Basque and Navarre. The annual reported cases of human C. burnetii infection in the US went up from 19 cases in 2000 to around 160-180 cases per year, with 178 acute cases in 2019. In the US, cases of human infection were mainly found in the West or the Great Plains regions of the country. Canada has a low human incidence of infection. In Quebec, it was reported that there were 0.4 cases per 100,000 inhabitants in 2017. In Alberta, only 39 cases were reported. Coxiella burnetii has been observed with a greater prevalence in populations in close proximity to animals as well as homeless populations in Brazil. In Algeria, residing in rural areas is a risk factor for contracting Coxiella burnetii infections compared to inhabitants of urban areas. Isiolo County, Kenya has been found to have a 44.7% seroprevalence of Coxiella burnetii in humans. In Kwara State, Nigeria, C. burnetii was found with a 18.8% prevalence in milk and cheese, contributing to further transmission of Q fever through consumption of milk products.

Coxiella burnetii and bacteria similar to it were found in tick species that populate wildlife in South Korea. The microbe has also been found in ticks that were collected from Churra Galega Mirandesa sheep in Portugal. Isiolo County, Kenya has been found to have a 47.9% seroprevalence of C. burnetii in livestock. The microbe has also been found in populations of water buffalo on the Nile Delta in Egypt. The highest seroprevalence found in Egypt was 15.5% in the city of Kafr El-Sheikh.

== Historical assessment of bioweapon potential ==
The United States ended its biological warfare program in 1969. When it did, C. burnetii was one of seven agents it had standardized as biological weapons. There are many unique aspects of C. burnetii that made it an attractive target of weaponization research. Most notably, C. burnetii maintains the lowest known pathogenic infectious dose, with some studies reporting that as low as one individual organism can incite infection in a human target. C. burnetii has an incubation period of 1–3 weeks in the body between the point of infection and when symptoms can arise, posing a challenge for source tracing of the agent, enhancing its bioweapon potential. C. burnetii can exist in two forms: a metabolically active large cell variant (LCV) and a spore-like small cell variant (SCV). The small cell variant is able to persist in the environment without a host while still maintaining infectious capabilities for years. Delicate enough to be dispersed miles by wind with negligible loss of virulence capabilities, the small cell variant is most responsible for dispersion of C. burnetii across large areas and transmission of Q fever within populations.

Common C. burnetii infections manifest as low grade flu-like symptoms, headache, malaise, and persistent myalgia. While the mortality rate for C. burnetii is only around 0.5-1.5%, the bacteria can persist in the body for years and develop into chronic Q fever with further intense complications. Around 20% of those infected with C. burnetii will experience chronic fatigue and symptoms that can last years or indefinitely after initial exposure. C. burnetii is profiled as an infectious agent because of its ability to manifest as Q fever. Due to its low mortality but high morbidity rate, the Centers for Disease Control (CDC) has listed C. burnetii as a Category B infectious agent. Category B is defined as being an agent that is moderately easy to disseminate and maintains lower lethality but more intense societal disruption.

The United States, Iraq, and the Soviet Union were among the countries heading research into the potential use of C. burnetii as a deliberately dispersed infectious agent in the mid-1900s. In the United States, C. burnetii was field tested as an aerosolized infection in both animal and rodent trials at the Dugway Proving Ground in Utah, USA. Field testing allowed researchers the opportunity to observe and draw conclusions regarding the bacteria's infectious dose, symptoms of disease, and progress into potential treatments. Testing of both rodent and human subjects within the same environment allowed for confirmation that C. burnetii can be transmitted from animals to humans.

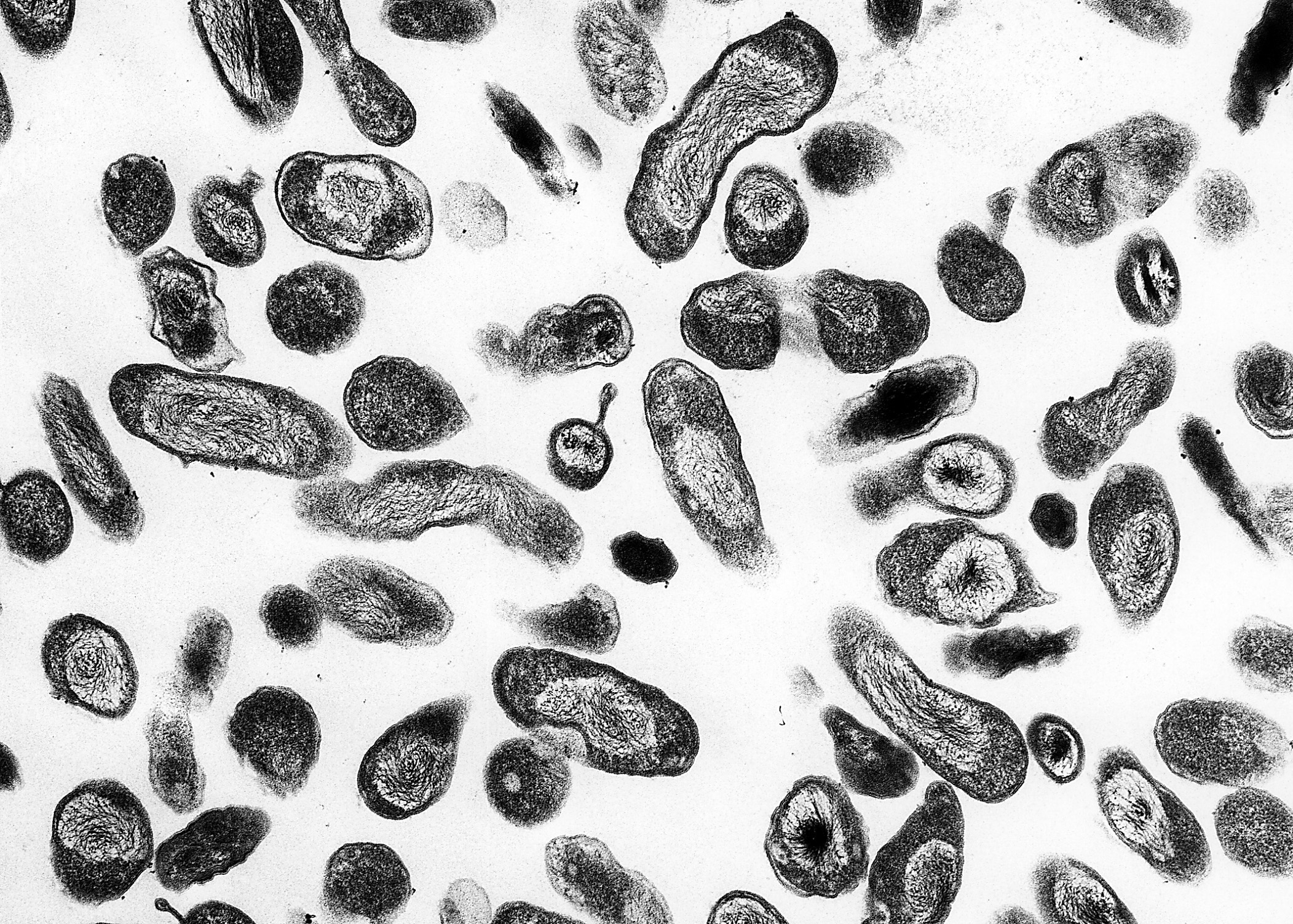
C. burnetii, the causative agent of Q fever

== Genomics ==
At least 75 completely sequenced genomes of Coxiella burnetii strains exist, which contain about 2.1 million base pairs of DNA each and encode around 2,100 open reading frames (ORFs), which are stretches of DNA that can be read to produce proteins; 746 (or about 35%) of these genes have no known function.

Recent advances in sequencing techniques, particularly selective whole genome amplification (SWGA), allowed for the recovery of even more C. burnetii genomes. These samples were found in clinical and environmental studies. In one study, researchers applied SWGA to environmental samples such as unpasteurized milk and goat vaginal swabs. The technique helped increase the amount of C. burnetii DNA found in the samples by up to 147 times more than before. This improvement dramatically increased bacterial reads and genome coverage from less than 1% of sequence reads to as high as 74%, providing enough genetic information to compare different strains and understand how they are related. The ability to sequence C. burnetii even when it is present in very small amounts helps expand what we know about its genetic diversity and supports better tracking of how the bacteria spread and evolve.

In bacteria, molecules called small regulatory RNAs are activated during stress and virulence conditions. In Coxiella burnetii, several of these small RNAs (named CbSRs 1, 11, 12, and 14) are encoded within intergenic regions (IGR), or the DNA between genes. CbSRs 2, 3, 4 and 9 are located complementary to identified ORFs. The CbSRs are up-regulated during intracellular growth in host cells.

All C. burnetii strains contain extra genetic material - either one of four large plasmids (QpH1, QpDG, QpRS, or QpDV) or a piece of DNA in the chromosome that originated from the QpRS plasmid. The QpH1 plasmid plays a key role in helping the bacteria survive inside host cells such as mouse macrophages and Vero cells, although it is not needed for growth in artificial (axenic) culture. QpH1 also contains a toxin-antitoxin system, which may help the plasmid remain stable in the bacteria. Among all of these plasmids, eight conserved genes produce proteins that the bacteria inject into the host cells via the secretion system.

== One Health implications and significance ==
Coxiella burnetii is recognized as one of the most widely distributed zoonotic pathogens in the world and the causative agent of Q fever. One Health is an approach that emphasizes the interconnectedness of environmental, animal, and human health. Due to its zoonotic transmission pathways and exceptional environmental persistence, C. burnetii is regarded as a priority pathogen within the One Health approach. Its ability to resist environmental stressors and infect a broad range of hosts allows the circulation of C. burnetii between diverse hosts and environments. C. burnetii can be transmitted from animals to humans, with livestock serving as the primary reservoir responsible for most human infections. Livestock, mainly sheep, goats, and cattle can remain relatively asymptomatic upon infection, facilitating undetected transmission of C. burnetii between hosts. Rural populations are often in closer contact with C. burnetii than urban or suburban communities due to proximity to livestock. A range of antibiotics and combination therapies have been found to be effective at clearing individual infections after detection and onset of symptoms. The Q-Vax vaccine can provide effective prevention of an initial infection, although this vaccine has not been widely implemented due to high incidence of a post-vaccination hypersensitivity reaction. Ongoing research is focussed on remodelling this vaccine to ensure that side effects are minimized and widespread deployment is successful. The global distribution of C. burnetii can be attributed to its uniquely resilient small cell variant that is able to be dispersed miles by wind and persist in its environment for years. Diagnosis of a C. burnetii infection remains difficult, as its acute manifestation can resemble that of many other non-specific and self-limiting infectious diseases. Control of outbreaks is further complicated by the pathogens environmental resilience, capacity for aerosol transmission, and widespread distribution. Lack of a widely approved vaccine and the difficulty of detecting C. burnetii make it an ongoing subject of public health and infectious disease research.
