= Inositol-phosphate phosphatase =

Class of enzymes

inositol-1(or 4)-monophosphatase
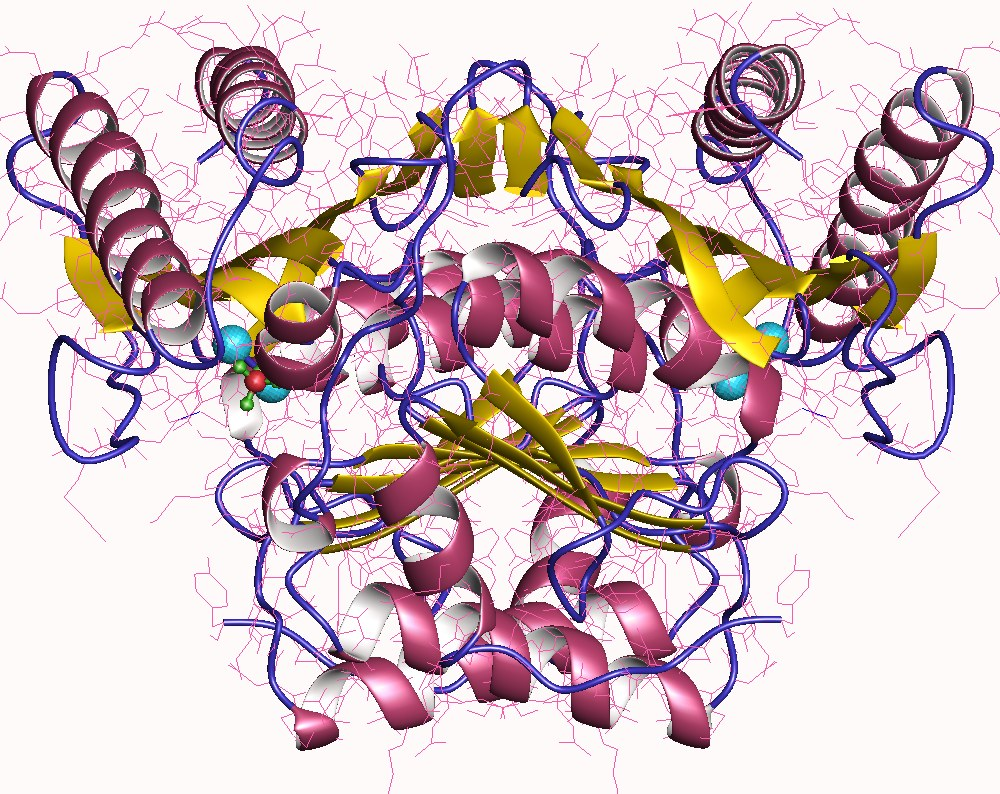
- Inositol monophosphatase 2, dimer, Human

Identifiers
- EC no.: 3.1.3.25
- CAS no.: 37184-63-7

Databases
- BRENDA: enzyme data
- ExPASy: NiceZyme view
- KEGG: enzyme entry
- MetaCyc: metabolic pathway
- Rhea: reactions
- PDB structures: RCSB PDB PDBe PDBsum
- Gene Ontology: AmiGO / QuickGO
Search
- PMC: articles
- PubMed: articles
- NCBI: proteins

Inositol monophosphatase 1

Identifiers
- Symbol: IMPA1
- Alt. symbols: IMP; IMPA
- NCBI gene: 3612
- HGNC: 6050
- OMIM: 602064
- RefSeq: NP_001138350
- UniProt: P29218

Other data
- EC number: 3.1.3.25
- Locus: Chr. 8 q21.1-q21.3
Search for
- Structures: Swiss-model
- Domains: InterPro

Inositol monophosphatase 2
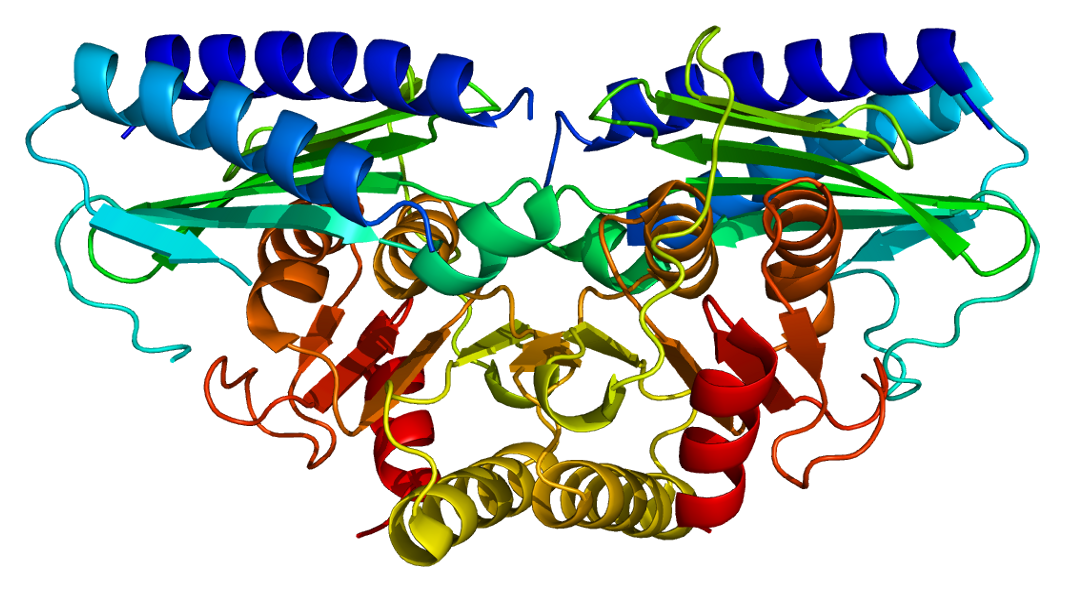
- X-ray crystal structure of inositol monophosphatase 2

Identifiers
- Symbol: IMPA2
- NCBI gene: 3613
- HGNC: 6051
- OMIM: 605922
- RefSeq: NP_055029
- UniProt: O14732

Other data
- EC number: 3.1.3.25
- Locus: Chr. 18 p11.2
Search for
- Structures: Swiss-model
- Domains: InterPro

Inositol monophosphatase 3

Identifiers
- Symbol: IMPAD1
- Alt. symbols: IMPA3
- NCBI gene: 54928
- HGNC: 26019
- OMIM: 614010
- RefSeq: NP_060283
- UniProt: Q9NX62

Other data
- EC number: 3.1.3.25
- Locus: Chr. 8 q12.1
Search for
- Structures: Swiss-model
- Domains: InterPro

The enzyme Inositol phosphate-phosphatase (IMPase, EC 3.1.3.25) is a member of the phosphodiesterase family of enzymes. It is involved in the phosphophatidylinositol signaling pathway, which affects a wide array of cell functions, including but not limited to, cell growth, apoptosis, secretion, and information processing. Inhibition of inositol monophosphatase may be key in the action of lithium in treating bipolar disorder, specifically manic depression.

The catalyzed reaction:

myo-inositol phosphate + H_{2}O $\rightleftharpoons$ myo-inositol + phosphate

== Nomenclature ==
This enzyme belongs to the family of hydrolases, specifically those acting on phosphoric monoester bonds. The systematic name is myo-inositol-phosphate phosphohydrolase. Other names in common use include:

- myo-inositol-1(or 4)-monophosphatase,
- inositol 1-phosphatase,
- L-myo-inositol-1-phosphate phosphatase,
- myo-inositol 1-phosphatase,
- inositol phosphatase,
- inositol monophosphate phosphatase,
- inositol-1(or 4)-monophosphatase,
- myo-inositol-1(or 4)-phosphate phosphohydrolase,
- myo-inositol monophosphatase, and
- myo-inositol-1-phosphatase.

== Structure ==
The enzyme is a dimer comprising 277 amino acid residues per subunit. Each dimer exists in 5 layers of alternating α-helices and β-sheets, totaling to 9 α-helices and β-sheets per subunit. IMPase has three hydrophilic hollow active sites, each of which bind water and magnesium molecules. These binding sites appear to be conserved in other phosphodiesterases such as fructose 1,6-bisphosphatase (FBPase) and inositol polyphosphate 1-phosphatase.

== Catalytic mechanism ==
It was previously reported that the hydrolysis of inositol monophosphate was catalyzed by IMPase through a 2-magnesium ion mechanism. However a recent 1.4 A resolution crystal structure shows 3 magnesium ions coordinating in each active binding site of the 2 dimers, supporting a 3-magnesium ion mechanism. The mechanism for hydrolysis is now thought to proceed as such: the enzyme is activated by a magnesium ion binding to binding site I, containing three water molecules, and stabilized by the negative charges on the carboxylates of Glu70 and Asp90, and the carbonyl of Ile92. Another magnesium ion then cooperatively binds to binding site 2, which has of carboxylates of Asp90, Asp93, Asp220, and three water molecules, one of which is shared by binding site 1. Then, a third magnesium weakly and non-cooperatively to the third binding site, which has 5 water molecules and residue Glu70. After all three magnesium ions have bound, the inositol monophosphatase can bind, the negatively charge phosphate group stabilized by the three positively charged magnesium ions. Finally an activated water molecule acts a nucleophile and hydrolyzes the substrate, giving inositol and inorganic phosphate.

== Function ==
Inositol monophosphatase plays an important role in maintaining intracellular levels of myo-inositol, a molecule that forms the structural basis of several secondary messengers in eukaryotic cells. IMPase dephosphorylates the isomers of inositol monophosphate to produce inositol, mostly in the form of the stereoisomer, myo-inositol.

The enzyme acts on five of the six isomers of inositol monophosphate. For example it converts inositol 3-phosphate to inositol and orthophosphate:

inositol 3-phosphate
H_{2}O
P_{i}
inositol

Inositol monophosphatase is able to regulate inositol homeostasis because it lies at the convergence of two pathways that generate inositol:

- The phosphatidylinositol signaling pathway
- The de novo biosynthesis of inositol from glucose 6-phosphate

=== Inositol monophosphatase in the phosphatidylinositol signaling pathway ===
In this pathway, G-coupled protein receptors and tyrosine kinase receptors are activated, resulting in the activation of phospholipase C, which hydrolyzes phosphatidylinositol 4,5-bisphosphate (PIP_{2}), resulting in a membrane associated product, diacylglycerol, and a water-soluble product, inositol triphosphate. Diacylglycerol acts as a second messenger, activating several protein kinases and produces extended downstream signaling. Inositol triphosphate is also a second messenger which activates receptors on the endoplasmic reticulum to release calcium ion stores into the cytoplasm, creating a complex signaling system that can be involved in modulating fertilization, proliferation, contraction, cell metabolism, vesicle and fluid secretion, and information processing in neuronal cells. Overall, diacylglycerol and inositol triphosphate signaling has implications for neuronal plasticity, impacting hippocampal long term potentiation, stress-induced cognitive impairment, and neuronal growth cone spreading. Furthermore, not only is PIP_{2} a precursor to several signaling molecules, it can be phosphorylated at the 3’ position to become PIP_{3}, which is involved in cell proliferation, apoptosis and cell movement.

In this pathway, IMPase is the common, final step in recycling IP_{3} to produce PIP_{2}. IMPase does this by dephosphorylating inositol monophosphate to produce inorganic phosphate and myo-inositol, the precursor to PIP_{2}. Because of IMPase's crucial role in this signaling pathway, it is a potential drug target for inhibition and modulation.

=== Inositol monophosphatase in the de novo synthesis of myo-inositol ===
There are at least 2 known steps in the de novo synthesis of myo-inositol from glucose 6-phosphate. In the first step, glucose 6-phosphate is converted to D-inositol 1 monophosphate by the enzyme glucose 6 phosphate cyclase. Inositol monophosphatase catalyzes the final step in which D-inositol 1 monophosphate is dephosphorylated to form myo-inositol.

== Clinical significance ==
Inositol monophosphatase has historically been believed to be a direct target of lithium, the primary treatment for bipolar disorder. It is thought that lithium acts according to the inositol depletion hypothesis: lithium produces its therapeutic effect by inhibiting IMPase and therefore decreasing levels of myo-inositol. Scientific support for this hypothesis exists but is limited; the complete role of lithium and inositol monophosphatase in treating bipolar disorder or reducing myo-inositol levels is not well understood.

In support of the inositol depletion hypothesis, researchers have shown that lithium binds uncompetitively to purified bovine inositol monophosphatase at the site of one of the magnesium ions. Rodents administered lithium showed a decrease in inositol levels, in line with the hypothesis. Valproate, another mood-stabilizing drug given to bipolar disorder patients, has also been shown to mimic the effects of lithium on myo-inositol.

However, some clinical studies have found that bipolar disorder patients that had been administered lithium showed lower myo-inositol levels, while others found no effect on myo-inositol levels. Furthermore, lithium also binds to inositol polyphosphate 1-phosphatase (IPP), an enzyme also present in the phosphoinositide pathway, and could lower inositol levels through this mechanism More research is required to fully explain the role that lithium and IMPase play in bipolar disorder patients.

Despite the fact that lithium is effective in treating bipolar disorder, the toxic dose is only marginally greater than the therapeutic dose. A novel inhibitor of inositol monophosphatase that is less toxic could be a more desirable treatment for bipolar disorder. Such an inhibitor would need to cross the blood–brain barrier in order to reach the inositol monophosphatase in neurons.
