= Fibrin ring granuloma =

Pathological finding in microscopy

A fibrin ring granuloma, also known as doughnut granuloma, is a histopathological finding that is characteristic of Q fever. On hematoxylin-eosin staining, the fibrin ring granuloma consists of a central lipid vacuole (usually washed-out during fixing and staining, leaving only an empty hole) surrounded by a dense red fibrin ring and epithelioid macrophages. Fibrin ring granulomas may also be seen in Hodgkin's disease and infectious mononucleosis.

== See also ==
- Granuloma
