= Inositol monophosphatase 2 =

Protein-coding gene in the species Homo sapiens

IMPA2
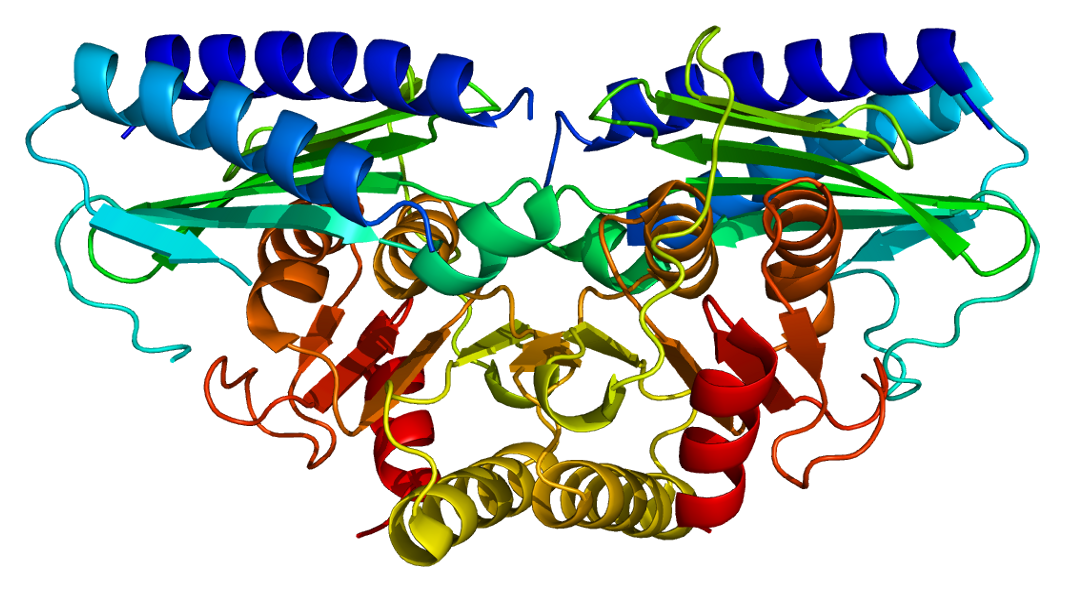

Identifiers
- Aliases: IMPA2, inositol monophosphatase 2
- External IDs: OMIM: 605922; MGI: 2149728; GeneCards: IMPA2
Available structures
PDB	Ortholog search: A0A6I8PI91 PDBe A0A6I8PI91 RCSB
PDB	List of PDB id codes 2CZH, 2CZI, 2CZK, 2DDK, 2FVZ
Enzyme activity
EC #	BRENDA	ExPASy	KEGG	MetaCyc
3.1.3.25	↗	↗	↗	↗

Gene location (Human)
Chr.	Chromosome 18 (human)
Band	18p11.21	Start	11,981,025 bp
Band	18p11.21	End	12,030,877 bp
RNA expression pattern
Bgee	Human / Mouse (ortholog); Top expressed in: body of pancreas; skin of abdomen; gastrocnemius muscle; skin of leg; muscle of thigh; human kidney; vulva; skin of thigh; Skeletal muscle tissue of rectus abdominis; mucosa of transverse colon / n/a; More reference expression data
BioGPS	n/a
Gene ontology
Molecular function	inositol monophosphate 1-phosphatase activity; inositol monophosphate phosphatase activity; hydrolase activity; protein binding; protein homodimerization activity; metal ion binding; inositol monophosphate 3-phosphatase activity; inositol monophosphate 4-phosphatase activity
Cellular component	cytoplasm; cytosol
Biological process	phosphate-containing compound metabolic process; phosphatidylinositol phosphate biosynthetic process; inositol phosphate metabolic process; inositol metabolic process; inositol biosynthetic process; signal transduction; inositol phosphate dephosphorylation
Sources:Amigo / QuickGO
Orthologs
Databases	NCBI: entry; OMA: entry
Species	Human	Mouse
Entrez	3613	114663
Ensembl	ENSG00000141401	n/a
UniProt	O14732	Q91UZ5
RefSeq (mRNA)	NM_014214	NM_053261
RefSeq (protein)	NP_055029	NP_444491
Location (UCSC)	Chr 18: 11.98 – 12.03 Mb	n/a
PubMed search
- Wikidata
View/Edit Human	View/Edit Mouse

Inositol monophosphatase 2 is a 32 kDa enzyme that in humans is encoded by the IMPA2 gene. IMPA2 dephosphorylates myo-inositol monophosphate to myo-inositol.

The function of IMPA2 appears to be similar to IMPA1 within tissues; however, the genes are expressed differently in various tissues with IMPA2 expressed at the highest level in certain tissues of the brain and the lumen of the kidney. IMPA2 exists as a homodimer within cells and cannot form heterodimers with IMPA1.
