= Edward Holbrook Derrick =

Australian pathologist

Edward Holbrook Derrick (1898–1976) was an Australian pathologist, best known for his role in identifying Q fever.

Derrick was born in Victoria, and earned an M.D. from Melbourne University in 1922. He subsequently worked for a short period of time at the Walter and Eliza Hall Institute in Melbourne, and spent a year studying pathology at London Hospital. He later served as director of the Laboratory of Microbiology and Pathology of the Queensland Health Department from 1934 to 1947, during which time he played a significant role in the investigation and discovery of Q fever. An outbreak was brought to his attention as director in 1935, and he spent the next few years, with a number of colleagues, researching its characteristics and cause. In addition, he gave it the name "Q fever", originally intended as a temporary name, with the "Q" standing for "query" at a time when its cause was still unknown.
