= Inositol monophosphatase 1 =

Protein-coding gene in the species Homo sapiens

IMPA1
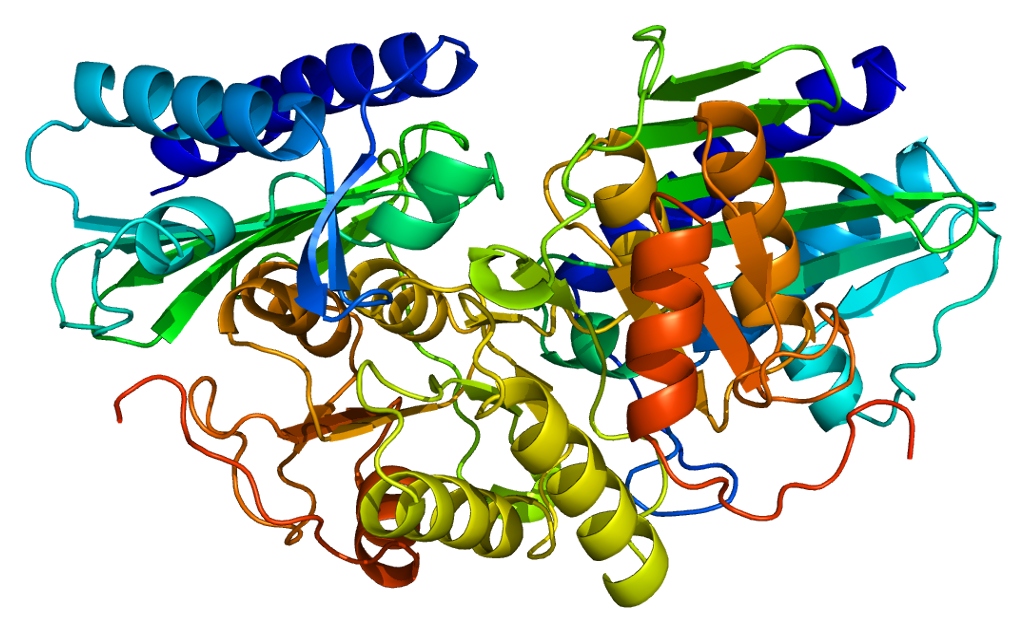

Identifiers
- Aliases: IMPA1, IMP, IMPA, inositol monophosphatase 1, MRT59
- External IDs: OMIM: 602064; MGI: 1933158; GeneCards: IMPA1
Available structures
PDB	Ortholog search: PDBe RCSB
PDB	List of PDB id codes 1AWB, 1IMA, 1IMB, 1IMC, 1IMD, 1IME, 1IMF, 2HHM, 4AS4
Enzyme activity
EC #	BRENDA	ExPASy	KEGG	MetaCyc
3.1.3.25	↗	↗	↗	↗
3.1.3.94	↗	↗	↗	↗

Gene location (Human)
Chr.	Chromosome 8 (human)
Band	8q21.13	Start	81,656,914 bp
Band	8q21.13	End	81,686,331 bp

Gene location (Mouse)
Chr.	Chromosome 3 (mouse)
Band	3|3 A1	Start	10,377,016 bp
Band	3|3 A1	End	10,396,499 bp
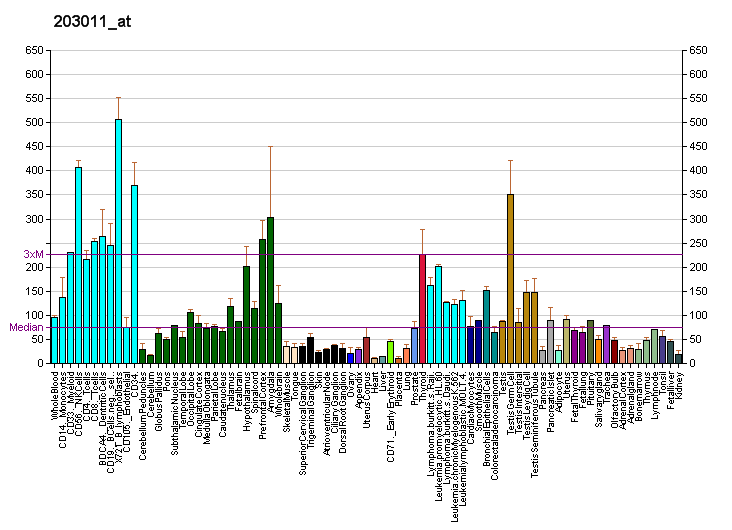
RNA expression pattern
Bgee	Human / Mouse (ortholog); Top expressed in: secondary oocyte; jejunal mucosa; endothelial cell; mucosa of colon; tibia; mucosa of sigmoid colon; right ventricle; Brodmann area 23; Epithelium of choroid plexus; bronchial epithelial cell / Top expressed in: motor neuron; ciliary body; retinal pigment epithelium; iris; Paneth cell; facial motor nucleus; conjunctival fornix; external carotid artery; Epithelium of choroid plexus; primitive streak; More reference expression data
BioGPS	More reference expression data
Gene ontology
Molecular function	inositol monophosphate phosphatase activity; manganese ion binding; protein homodimerization activity; metal ion binding; lithium ion binding; protein binding; identical protein binding; hydrolase activity; magnesium ion binding; inositol monophosphate 1-phosphatase activity; inositol monophosphate 4-phosphatase activity; inositol monophosphate 3-phosphatase activity
Cellular component	cytoplasm; cytosol
Biological process	inositol metabolic process; inositol biosynthetic process; inositol phosphate metabolic process; phosphatidylinositol phosphate biosynthetic process; phosphate-containing compound metabolic process; phosphatidylinositol biosynthetic process; signal transduction; inositol phosphate dephosphorylation
Sources:Amigo / QuickGO
Orthologs
Databases	NCBI: entry; OMA: entry
Species	Human	Mouse
Entrez	3612	55980
Ensembl	ENSG00000133731	ENSMUSG00000027531
UniProt	P29218	O55023
RefSeq (mRNA)	NM_005536; NM_001144878; NM_001144879	NM_018864; NM_001310433
RefSeq (protein)	NP_001138350; NP_001138351; NP_005527	n/a
Location (UCSC)	Chr 8: 81.66 – 81.69 Mb	Chr 3: 10.38 – 10.4 Mb
PubMed search
- Wikidata
View/Edit Human	View/Edit Mouse

Inositol monophosphatase 1 is an enzyme that in humans is encoded by the IMPA1 gene.

== Structure ==
Inositol monophosphatase 1 (IMPA1) is a homodimeric enzyme with each subunit consisting of approximately 277 amino acids and a molecular weight of ~30 kDa. The protein adopts a penta-layered αβαβα core structure, characteristic of the metallophosphatase superfamily, which is also observed in related enzymes like fructose 1,6-bisphosphatase. Each monomer's active site contains three magnesium ions arranged in an octahedral coordination geometry, bound by conserved residues including Glu70, Asp90, Asp93, and Asp220. Structural studies using X-ray crystallography (e.g., PDB entries 1IMA, 1IMB) reveal that the dimeric arrangement facilitates substrate recognition and catalysis. The enzyme features an Inositol_P domain (Pfam: PF00459), which mediates its magnesium-dependent phosphatase activity and interaction with substrates like myo-inositol monophosphate. These structural features underpin IMPA1's role in inositol recycling and its sensitivity to lithium inhibition, which occurs through competitive displacement of magnesium ions at the active site.

== Function ==
Inositol monophosphatase 1 (IMPA1) is a magnesium-dependent phosphatase that catalyzes the dephosphorylation of myo-inositol monophosphate to produce free myo-inositol, a crucial precursor for the synthesis of phosphatidylinositol and polyphosphoinositides. These lipids are essential components of cell membranes and play a central role in intracellular signal transduction, particularly in generating the second messengers inositol 1,4,5-trisphosphate and diacylglycerol. IMPA1 exhibits broad substrate specificity, being able to act on various inositol phosphate isomers and other sugar phosphates such as glucose-1-phosphate and fructose-1-phosphate. The enzyme is also notable for being inhibited by lithium at therapeutic concentrations, which underlies its relevance in the treatment of bipolar disorder, as lithium's inhibition of IMPA1 leads to reduced inositol recycling and may modulate phosphoinositide signaling in the brain. Beyond its metabolic role, IMPA1 has been implicated in processes such as autophagy, apoptosis, and cancer progression, highlighting its broader significance in cellular physiology.

== Interacting partners ==
IMPA1 has been shown to interact with Bergmann glial S100B and calbindin.

== Clinical significance ==
=== As a drug target ===
Inhibition of IMPA1 can produce pleiotropic effects on cellular function, including alterations in phosphoinositide signalling, autophagy, apoptosis, and other processes.

L-690,330 is a competitive inhibitor of IMPase with high activity in in vitro assays, but it exhibits limited bioavailability in vivo. Owing to its increased specificity relative to lithium, L-690,330 has been widely used to investigate the effects of IMPase inhibition in various cell culture systems. A more cell-permeable prodrug, L-690,488, has also been developed. Treatment of cortical slices with L-690,488 leads to accumulation of inositol, confirming the activity of this inhibitor in tissue.

=== Bipolar disorder ===
It was initially observed that several drugs effective in treating bipolar disorder—such as lithium, carbamazepine, and valproic acid—share a common mechanism of action involving enzymes in the phosphatidylinositol signalling pathway. This led to the proposal of the inositol depletion hypothesis as a potential explanation for the pathophysiology of bipolar disorder. However, extensive research has not confirmed this hypothesis, in part because lithium also affects multiple other enzymes within the same pathway, complicating the interpretation of results from in vitro studies.

=== Intellectual developmental disorder ===
A homozygous 5-base pair duplication in the IMPA1 gene, resulting in a frameshift and premature stop codon, was identified in a Brazilian family with autosomal recessive intellectual developmental disorder (MRT-59). This mutation, which disrupts neuronal progenitor cell function and impairs differentiation, was absent in control populations and may affect intracellular signaling and neurotransmitter release. Genetic analysis suggests that this syndrome arose in Brazil approximately 200 years ago.
