= Aquicella =

Scientific classification
- Domain: Bacteria
- Kingdom: Pseudomonadati
- Phylum: Pseudomonadota
- Class: Gammaproteobacteria
- Order: Legionellales
- Family: Coxiellaceae
- Genus: Aquicella; Santos et al., 2004

Species
- Aquicella lusitana; Aquicella siphonis

Genus of bacteria

Aquicella is a genus of Gram-negative rod-shaped cells and filaments in the family Coxiellaceae from the order Legionellales. The type species of this genus is Aquicella lusitana.

The name Aquicella is composed of the Latin term aqua (referring to water) and the Latin term cella (referring to a chamber, closet, or cabinet, or in biology, a cell). Together, the name Aquicella translates to a cell from water.

== Biochemical Characteristics and Molecular Signatures ==
Members of this genus grow in protozoa and can be isolated from hydrothermal areas. All members are strictly aerobic, non-motile, do not produce spores and are oxidase and catalase negative. Aquicella species can grow in temperatures ranging from 30 °C to 43 °C and require a neutral pH and growth media containing activated charcoal and a-ketoglutarate. Colonies appear whitish with a pink or blue sheen.

Analyses of genome sequences from Aquicella species identified six conserved signature indels (CSIs) as exclusively present in members of this genus in the proteins 30S ribosomal protein S6-L-glutamate ligase, crossover junction endodeoxyribonuclease RuvC, Tim44 domain-containing protein, pyruvate dehydrogenase (acetyl-transferring), homodimeric type, c-type cytochrome and response regulator transcription factor. These CSIs serve to molecularly demarcate this genus from other Coxiellaceae species and all other bacteria.
