= Legionella gormanii =

Scientific classification
- Domain: Bacteria
- Kingdom: Pseudomonadati
- Phylum: Pseudomonadota
- Class: Gammaproteobacteria
- Order: Legionellales
- Family: Legionellaceae
- Genus: Legionella
- Species: L. gormanii

Binomial name
- Legionella gormanii Morris et al. 1980

Type strain
- ALLO3, ATCC 33297, ATCC 33342, CCUG 12267, CIP 104724, DSM 16641, LS-13 (ALLO3), LS12.9, NCTC 11401

Synonyms
- Fluoribacter gormanii

Species of bacterium

Legionella gormanii is a Gram-negative bacterium from the genus Legionella which was isolated from soil samples from a creek bank in Atlanta and from the bronchial brush specimen of a patient who suffered from pneumonia. L. gormanii can cause atypical pneumonia together with L. pneumophila.
