= Cellvibrio fontiphilus =

Scientific classification
- Domain: Bacteria
- Kingdom: Pseudomonadati
- Phylum: Pseudomonadota
- Class: Gammaproteobacteria
- Order: Cellvibrionales
- Family: Cellvibrionaceae
- Genus: Cellvibrio
- Species: C. fontiphilus

Binomial name
- Cellvibrio fontiphilus (Liu 2016) Chen et al. 2017

Type strain
- MVW-40, KCTC 52237

Species of bacterium

Cellvibrio fontiphilus is a Gram-negative, strictly aerobic and motile bacterium from the genus of Cellvibrio which has been isolated from the Maolin Spring in Taiwan (Maolin National Scenic Area).
