= Cellvibrio japonicus =

Scientific classification
- Domain: Bacteria
- Kingdom: Pseudomonadati
- Phylum: Pseudomonadota
- Class: Gammaproteobacteria
- Order: Cellvibrionales
- Family: Cellvibrionaceae
- Genus: Cellvibrio
- Species: C. japonicus

Binomial name
- Cellvibrio japonicus Humphry et al. 2003

Synonyms
- Pseudomonas fluorescens subsp. cellulosa

Species of bacterium

Cellvibrio japonicus is a Gram-negative soil bacterium.
