= Cellvibrio diazotrophicus =

Scientific classification
- Domain: Bacteria
- Kingdom: Pseudomonadati
- Phylum: Pseudomonadota
- Class: Gammaproteobacteria
- Order: Cellvibrionales
- Family: Cellvibrionaceae
- Genus: Cellvibrio
- Species: C. diazotrophicus

Binomial name
- Cellvibrio diazotrophicus Suarez et al. 2014

Type strain
- E20, E50, KACC 17069, LMG 27267

Species of bacterium

Cellvibrio diazotrophicus is a Gram-negative, rod-shaped, aerobic and nitrogen-fixing bacterium from the genus of Cellvibrio which has been isolated from the rhizosphere of the plants Plantago winteri and Hordeum secalinum near Münzenberg in Germany.
