= Cellvibrio zantedeschiae =

Scientific classification
- Domain: Bacteria
- Kingdom: Pseudomonadati
- Phylum: Pseudomonadota
- Class: Gammaproteobacteria
- Order: Cellvibrionales
- Family: Cellvibrionaceae
- Genus: Cellvibrio
- Species: C. zantedeschiae

Binomial name
- Cellvibrio zantedeschiae Sheu et al. 2017

Type strain
- BCRC 80525, TPY-10, KCTC 32239, LMG 27291

Species of bacterium

Cellvibrio zantedeschiae is a Gram-negative, strictly aerobic and motile bacterium from the genus of Cellvibrio which has been isolated from the roots of the plant Zantedeschia aethiopica from Taiwan.
