= Cellvibrio fibrivorans =

Scientific classification
- Domain: Bacteria
- Kingdom: Pseudomonadati
- Phylum: Pseudomonadota
- Class: Gammaproteobacteria
- Order: Cellvibrionales
- Family: Cellvibrionaceae
- Genus: Cellvibrio
- Species: C. fibrivorans

Binomial name
- Cellvibrio fibrivorans Mergaert et al. 2003

Type strain
- ACM 5172, R4079, LMG 18561

Species of bacterium

Cellvibrio fibrivorans is a bacterium from the genus of Cellvibrio which has been isolated from soil from a Botanic garden in Ghent in Belgium.
