= Legionella monrovica =

Scientific classification
- Domain: Bacteria
- Kingdom: Pseudomonadati
- Phylum: Pseudomonadota
- Class: Gammaproteobacteria
- Order: Legionellales
- Family: Legionellaceae
- Genus: Legionella
- Species: L. monrovica

Binomial name
- Legionella monrovica

Species of bacterium

Legionella monrovica is a Gram-negative bacterium from the genus Legionella.
