= Legionella hackeliae =

Scientific classification
- Domain: Bacteria
- Kingdom: Pseudomonadati
- Phylum: Pseudomonadota
- Class: Gammaproteobacteria
- Order: Legionellales
- Family: Legionellaceae
- Genus: Legionella
- Species: L. hackeliae

Binomial name
- Legionella hackeliae Brenner et al. 1985

Type strain
- ATCC 35250, Bibb Lancing 2, CCUG 31232 A, CIP 103844, DSM 19214, GIFU 10740, JCM 7563, NCTC 11979

Species of bacterium

Legionella hackeliae is a Gram-negative bacterium from the genus Legionella which was isolated from human lung aspirate in Pennsylvania.
