= Legionella erythra =

Scientific classification
- Domain: Bacteria
- Kingdom: Pseudomonadati
- Phylum: Pseudomonadota
- Class: Gammaproteobacteria
- Order: Legionellales
- Family: Legionellaceae
- Genus: Legionella
- Species: L. erythra

Binomial name
- Legionella erythra Brenner et al. 1985

Type strain
- ATCC 35303, CCUG 29667, CIP 103843, DSM 17644, GIFU 11748, JCM 7564, NCTC 11977, SE-32A-C8

Species of bacterium

Legionella erythra is a Gram-negative bacterium from the genus Legionella which was isolated from cooling-tower water in Seattle.
