= Legionella quateirensis =

Scientific classification
- Domain: Bacteria
- Kingdom: Pseudomonadati
- Phylum: Pseudomonadota
- Class: Gammaproteobacteria
- Order: Legionellales
- Family: Legionellaceae
- Genus: Legionella
- Species: L. quateirensis

Binomial name
- Legionella quateirensis Dennis et al. 1993

Type strain
- ATCC 49507, CCUG 44899, CIP 105271, NCTC 12376, Thacker 1335

Gram-negative bacterium

Legionella quateirensis is a Gram-negative bacterium from the genus Legionella which was isolated from a shower in a hotel bathroom in Quarteira, Portugal.
