= Legionella gratiana =

Scientific classification
- Domain: Bacteria
- Kingdom: Pseudomonadati
- Phylum: Pseudomonadota
- Class: Gammaproteobacteria
- Order: Legionellales
- Family: Legionellaceae
- Genus: Legionella
- Species: L. gratiana

Binomial name
- Legionella gratiana Bornstein et al. 1991

Type strain
- ATCC 49413, ATCC 49668T, CCUG 44894, CDC 1242, CIP 105267, Lyon 8420412, NCTC 12388

Species of bacterium

Legionella gratiana is a Gram-negative bacterium from the genus Legionella which was isolated from water in the Savoy region in France from a thermal spa.
