= Legionella micdadei =

Scientific classification
- Domain: Bacteria
- Kingdom: Pseudomonadati
- Phylum: Pseudomonadota
- Class: Gammaproteobacteria
- Order: Legionellales
- Family: Legionellaceae
- Genus: Legionella
- Species: L. micdadei

Binomial name
- Legionella micdadei Hébert et al. 1980

Synonyms
- Tatlockia micdadei Legionella pittsburghensis

Species of bacterium

Legionella micdadei is a Gram-negative bacterium from the genus Legionella, which stains acid-fast. It stains weakly, but loses this trait upon being grown in culture. Tatlockia micdadei is an alternative term for L. micdadei, the Pittsburgh pneumonia agent and TATLOCK strain. It is named after Joseph E. McDade, who first isolated L. pneumophila.
