= Legionella lytica =

Scientific classification
- Domain: Bacteria
- Kingdom: Pseudomonadati
- Phylum: Pseudomonadota
- Class: Gammaproteobacteria
- Order: Legionellales
- Family: Legionellaceae
- Genus: Legionella
- Species: L. lytica

Binomial name
- Legionella lytica Hookey et al. 1996

Type strain
- CCUG 112, PCM 2298, L2

Synonyms
- Sarcobium lyticum

Species of bacterium

Legionella lytica is a Gram-negative bacterium from the genus Legionella.
