= Legionella bozemanae =

Scientific classification
- Domain: Bacteria
- Kingdom: Pseudomonadati
- Phylum: Pseudomonadota
- Class: Gammaproteobacteria
- Order: Legionellales
- Family: Legionellaceae
- Genus: Legionella
- Species: L. bozemanae

Binomial name
- Legionella bozemanae corrig. Brenner et al. 1980

Synonyms
- Fluoribacter bozemanae (Garrity et al. 1980)

Species of bacterium

Legionella bozemanae is a Gram-negative bacterium in the family Legionellaceae. Its type strain is WIGA (=ATCC 33217). It is associated with human pneumonia.
