= Legionella shakespearei =

Scientific classification
- Domain: Bacteria
- Kingdom: Pseudomonadati
- Phylum: Pseudomonadota
- Class: Gammaproteobacteria
- Order: Legionellales
- Family: Legionellaceae
- Genus: Legionella
- Species: L. shakespearei

Binomial name
- Legionella shakespearei Gupta et al. 1992

Type strain
- ATCC 49655, CCUG 31228 A, CDC 214, CIP 103541, NCTC 12829

Species of bacterium

Legionella shakespearei is a Gram-negative, weakly oxidase-positive, catalase-positive bacterium with a single polar flagellum from the genus Legionella which was isolated from a cooling tower in Stratford-upon-Avon in England. L. shakespearei is named after William Shakespeare because it was isolated in Stratford-upon-Avon.

== See also ==
- List of organisms named after famous people (born before 1800)
