= Legionella dresdenensis =

Scientific classification
- Domain: Bacteria
- Kingdom: Pseudomonadati
- Phylum: Pseudomonadota
- Class: Gammaproteobacteria
- Order: Legionellales
- Family: Legionellaceae
- Genus: Legionella
- Species: L. dresdenensis

Binomial name
- Legionella dresdenensis Lück et al. 2010

Type strain
- DSM 19488, NCTC 13409, W03-356

Species of bacterium

Legionella dresdenensis is a Gram-negative, oxidase-negative, aerobic, non-spore-forming bacterium from the genus Legionella which was isolated from the Elbe in Dresden in Germany.
