= Legionella gresilensis =

Scientific classification
- Domain: Bacteria
- Kingdom: Pseudomonadati
- Phylum: Pseudomonadota
- Class: Gammaproteobacteria
- Order: Legionellales
- Family: Legionellaceae
- Genus: Legionella
- Species: L. gresilensis

Binomial name
- Legionella gresilensis Lo Presti et al. 2001

Type strain
- ATCC 700509, CCUG 45920, CIP 106631, Greoux 11D13

Species of bacterium

Legionella gresilensis is a Gram-negative, aerobic, catalase-positive, non-spore-forming bacterium with a polar flagellum from the genus Legionella which was isolated from a shower from thermal spa water in the city Gréoux-les-Bains.
