= Legionella adelaidensis =

Scientific classification
- Domain: Bacteria
- Kingdom: Pseudomonadati
- Phylum: Pseudomonadota
- Class: Gammaproteobacteria
- Order: Legionellales
- Family: Legionellaceae
- Genus: Legionella
- Species: L. adelaidensis

Binomial name
- Legionella adelaidensis Benson et al. 1991

Type strain
- 1762-AUS-E, ATCC 49625, CCUG 31231 A, CDC 1762-AUS-E, CIP 103645, DSM 19888, NCTC 12735

Species of bacterium

Legionella adelaidensis is a Gram-negative, non-spore-forming, aerobic bacterium from the genus Legionella which was isolated from cooling tower water in Adelaide in South Australia.
