= Legionella maioricensis =

Scientific classification
- Domain: Bacteria
- Kingdom: Pseudomonadati
- Phylum: Pseudomonadota
- Class: Gammaproteobacteria
- Order: Legionellales
- Family: Legionellaceae
- Genus: Legionella
- Species: L. maioricensis

Binomial name
- Legionella maioricensis Crespi et al. 2023

Species of bacterium

Legionella maioricensis is a rod-shaped (typical for Legionella) bacterium belonging to the genus Legionella. It has a thin cell wall, is motile — can move using flagella and It needs L-cysteine for growth — a hallmark of Legionella species.

It was first isolated from the hot water distribution systems of a hospital and a shopping center during routine sampling. Researchers isolated two Legionella-like strains (HCPI-6^{T} and EUR-108). They have been characterized phenotypically, biochemically and genomically in terms of DNA relatedness. Both strains exhibited biochemical phenotypic profiles typical of Legionella species.

Use of comparative genome sequence-based analyses (ANI - Average Nucleotide Identity and dDDH digital DNA–DNA Hybridization) which are genomic comparison tools and measure how similar the DNA of one organism is to another, demonstrated that the strains represent a new species of the genus Legionella. The strains are sufficiently different from all previously known Legionella species and represent the novel species, Legionella maioricensis.
