= Legionella beliardensis =

Scientific classification
- Domain: Bacteria
- Kingdom: Pseudomonadati
- Phylum: Pseudomonadota
- Class: Gammaproteobacteria
- Order: Legionellales
- Family: Legionellaceae
- Genus: Legionella
- Species: L. beliardensis

Binomial name
- Legionella beliardensis Lo Presti et al. 2001

Type strain
- ATCC 700512, CCUG 45921, CIP 106632, DSM 19152, Montbeliard A1

Species of bacterium

Legionella beliardensis is a Gram-negative, catalase-positive, non-spore-forming, aerobic bacterium from the genus Legionella with a single polar flagellum, which was isolated from water from heating apparatus in Montbéliard in France.
