= Legionella fairfieldensis =

Scientific classification
- Domain: Bacteria
- Kingdom: Pseudomonadati
- Phylum: Pseudomonadota
- Class: Gammaproteobacteria
- Order: Legionellales
- Family: Legionellaceae
- Genus: Legionella
- Species: L. fairfieldensis

Binomial name
- Legionella fairfieldensis Thacker et al. 1991

Type strain
- 1725-AUS-E, 1725-Aus-E, ATCC 49588, CCUG 31235, CCUG 31235 A, CDC 1725-AUS-E, CIP 105266, NCTC 12488

Species of bacterium

Legionella fairfieldensis is a Gram-negative bacterium from the genus Legionella with a single polar flagellum, which was isolated from cooling tower water in Fairfield, Victoria.
