= Legionella wadsworthii =

Scientific classification
- Domain: Bacteria
- Kingdom: Pseudomonadati
- Phylum: Pseudomonadota
- Class: Gammaproteobacteria
- Order: Legionellales
- Family: Legionellaceae
- Genus: Legionella
- Species: L. wadsworthii

Binomial name
- Legionella wadsworthii Edelstein et al. 1983

Type strain
- ATCC 33877, CCUG 16415, CCUG 58308, CIP 103886, NCTC 11532, Wadsworth 81-716A

Species of bacterium

Legionella wadsworthii is a bacterium from the genus Legionella isolated from sputum from a patient in Los Angeles. It can cause pneumonia in humans.
