= Legionella waltersii =

Scientific classification
- Domain: Bacteria
- Kingdom: Pseudomonadati
- Phylum: Pseudomonadota
- Class: Gammaproteobacteria
- Order: Legionellales
- Family: Legionellaceae
- Genus: Legionella
- Species: L. waltersii

Binomial name
- Legionella waltersii Benson et al. 1996

Type strain
- 2074-AUS-E, ATCC 51914, CCUG 44924, CIP 104965

Species of bacterium

Legionella waltersii is a Gram-negative catalase- and oxidase-positive bacterium from the genus Legionella with a single polar flagellum which was isolated from a drinking water distribution system in Adelaide in Australia. L. waltersii is named after Reginald P. Walters. Legionella waltersii may can cause pneumonia.
