= Legionella drozanskii =

Scientific classification
- Domain: Bacteria
- Kingdom: Pseudomonadati
- Phylum: Pseudomonadota
- Class: Gammaproteobacteria
- Order: Legionellales
- Family: Legionellaceae
- Genus: Legionella
- Species: L. drozanskii

Binomial name
- Legionella drozanskii Adeleke et al. 2001

Type strain
- ATCC 700990, CCUG 43885, CIP 107644, DSM 19890, LLAP-1

Species of bacterium

Legionella drozanskii is a Gram-negative, catalase-positive, oxidase-negative bacterium in the genus Legionella. It was isolated from tank well water in Leeds in England.
