= Legionella moravica =

Scientific classification
- Domain: Bacteria
- Kingdom: Pseudomonadati
- Phylum: Pseudomonadota
- Class: Gammaproteobacteria
- Order: Legionellales
- Family: Legionellaceae
- Genus: Legionella
- Species: L. moravica

Binomial name
- Legionella moravica Wilkinson et al. 1989

Type strain
- ATCC 43877, CCUG 31117, CDC 1634-CZK-E, CIP 103883, DSM 19234, NCTC 12239

Species of bacterium

Legionella moravica is a Gram-negative bacterium from the genus Legionella which was isolated from cooling-tower water samples in Czechoslovakia.
