= Legionella quinlivanii =

Scientific classification
- Domain: Bacteria
- Kingdom: Pseudomonadati
- Phylum: Pseudomonadota
- Class: Gammaproteobacteria
- Order: Legionellales
- Family: Legionellaceae
- Genus: Legionella
- Species: L. quinlivanii

Binomial name
- Legionella quinlivanii Benson et al. 1990

Type strain
- 1442-Aus-E, ATCC 43830, Benson 1442-AUS-E, CCUG 31234 A, CDC 1442-AUS-E, CIP 105272, NCTC 12433

Species of bacterium

Legionella quinlivanii is a Gram-negative bacterium from the genus Legionella which was isolated from a cooling tower pond in London in United Kingdom.

Genomic information
- NCBI ID: 45073
- Ploidy: haploid
- Genome size: 3.61 Mb
- Number of chromosomes: 1
- Year of completion: 2015
