= Legionella steigerwaltii =

Scientific classification
- Domain: Bacteria
- Kingdom: Pseudomonadati
- Phylum: Pseudomonadota
- Class: Gammaproteobacteria
- Order: Legionellales
- Family: Legionellaceae
- Genus: Legionella
- Species: L. steigerwaltii

Binomial name
- Legionella steigerwaltii Brenner et al. 1985

Type strain
- ATCC 35302, CCUG 29674, CCUG 56441, CIP 103851, JCM 7558, NCTC 11991, SC-18-C9

Species of bacterium

Legionella steigerwaltii is a Gram-negative bacterium from the genus Legionella isolated from tap water in St. Croix on the Virgin Islands.
