= Legionella donaldsonii =

Scientific classification
- Domain: Bacteria
- Kingdom: Pseudomonadati
- Phylum: Pseudomonadota
- Class: Gammaproteobacteria
- Order: Legionellales
- Family: Legionellaceae
- Genus: Legionella
- Species: L. donaldsonii

Binomial name
- Legionella donaldsonii Lo Presti et al. 1999

Species of bacterium

Legionella donaldsonii is a Gram-negative, aerobic, non-spore-forming bacterium from the genus Legionella.
