= Legionella thermalis =

Scientific classification
- Domain: Bacteria
- Kingdom: Pseudomonadati
- Phylum: Pseudomonadota
- Class: Gammaproteobacteria
- Order: Legionellales
- Family: Legionellaceae
- Genus: Legionella
- Species: L. thermalis

Binomial name
- Legionella thermalis Ishizaki et al. 2016

Type strain
- JCM 30970, KCTC 42799, L-47

Species of bacterium

Legionella thermalis is a bacterium from the genus Legionella which has been isolated from water from a hot spring in Tokyo on Japan.
