= Legionella nagasakiensis =

Scientific classification
- Domain: Bacteria
- Kingdom: Pseudomonadati
- Phylum: Pseudomonadota
- Class: Gammaproteobacteria
- Order: Legionellales
- Family: Legionellaceae
- Genus: Legionella
- Species: L. nagasakiensis

Binomial name
- Legionella nagasakiensis Yang et al. 2012

Type strain
- ATCC BAA-1557, CDC-1796-JAP-E, JCM 15315

Species of bacterium

Legionella nagasakiensis is a Gram-negative bacterium from the genus Legionella which was isolated from a sample of hot spring water in Aomori in Japan and from human lung tissue. It is catalase-positive and rod-shaped, with a single polar flagellum.
