= Cellvibrio =

Scientific classification
- Domain: Bacteria
- Kingdom: Pseudomonadati
- Phylum: Pseudomonadota
- Class: Gammaproteobacteria
- Order: Cellvibrionales
- Family: Cellvibrionaceae
- Genus: Cellvibrio (ex Winogradsky 1929); Blackall et al. 1986

Type species
- Cellvibrio mixtus

Species
- C. diazotrophicus C. fibrivorans C. fulvus C. fontiphilus C. gandavensis C. japonicus C. mixtus C. ostraviensis C. vulgaris C. zantedeschiae

Genus of bacteria

Cellvibrio is a genus of Gammaproteobacteria. The cells are slender curved rods. Cellvibrio is (like all Proteobacteria) Gram-negative.
