= Legionella lansingensis =

Scientific classification
- Domain: Bacteria
- Kingdom: Pseudomonadati
- Phylum: Pseudomonadota
- Class: Gammaproteobacteria
- Order: Legionellales
- Family: Legionellaceae
- Genus: Legionella
- Species: L. lansingensis

Binomial name
- Legionella lansingensis Thacker et al. 1994

Type strain
- 1677-MI-H, ATCC 49751, CCUG 31227 A, CCUG 31227 B, CDC 1677-MI-H, CIP 103542, DSM 19556, NCTC 12830

Species of bacterium

Legionella lansingensis is a Gram-negative, catalase- and oxidase-positive bacterium from the genus Legionella with a single polar flagellum which was isolated from a patient with pneumonia through bronchoscopy.
