= Legionella saoudiensis =

Scientific classification
- Domain: Bacteria
- Kingdom: Pseudomonadati
- Phylum: Pseudomonadota
- Class: Gammaproteobacteria
- Order: Legionellales
- Family: Legionellaceae
- Genus: Legionella
- Species: L. saoudiensis

Binomial name
- Legionella saoudiensis Bajrai et al. 2016

Type strain
- CSUR P2101, DSM 101682, LH-SWC, LS-1

Species of bacterium

Legionella saoudiensis is a Gram-negative bacterium from the genus Legionella which has been isolated from sewage water from Jeddah in Saudi Arabia.
