= Legionella rowbothamii =

Scientific classification
- Domain: Bacteria
- Kingdom: Pseudomonadati
- Phylum: Pseudomonadota
- Class: Gammaproteobacteria
- Order: Legionellales
- Family: Legionellaceae
- Genus: Legionella
- Species: L. rowbothamii

Binomial name
- Legionella rowbothamii Adeleke et al. 2001

Type strain
- ATCC 700991, CCUG 43886, CIP 107646, LLAP-6

Species of bacterium

Legionella rowbothamii is a Gram-negative, catalase-positive, oxidase-negative bacterium from the genus Legionella which was isolated from water and sludge from an industrial liquifier tower. Discovered by Tim Rowbotham.
