= Legionella jeonii =

Candidatus Legionella jeonii

Scientific classification (Candidatus)
- Domain: Bacteria
- Phylum: Pseudomonadota
- Class: Gammaproteobacteria
- Order: Legionellales
- Family: Legionellaceae
- Genus: Legionella
- Species: Ca. L. jeonii

Binomial name
- Candidatus Legionella jeonii Park et al. 2004

Species of bacterium

Kwang Jeon's experiment: [I] Amoebae infected by x-bacteria [II] Many amoebae become sick and die [III] Survivors have x-bacteria living in their cytoplasm [IV] Antibiotics kill x-bacteria: host amoebae die as now dependent on x-bacteria.

Candidatus Legionella jeonii is a candidatus species of bacteria from the genus Legionella. Previously known as X-bacterium, Candidatus Legionella jeonii grows symbiotically in Amoeba proteus. This endosymbiotic relationship was first noticed by Kwang Jeon and Joan Lorch in 1966.

A more recent reference dropped "Candidatus" from its name.
