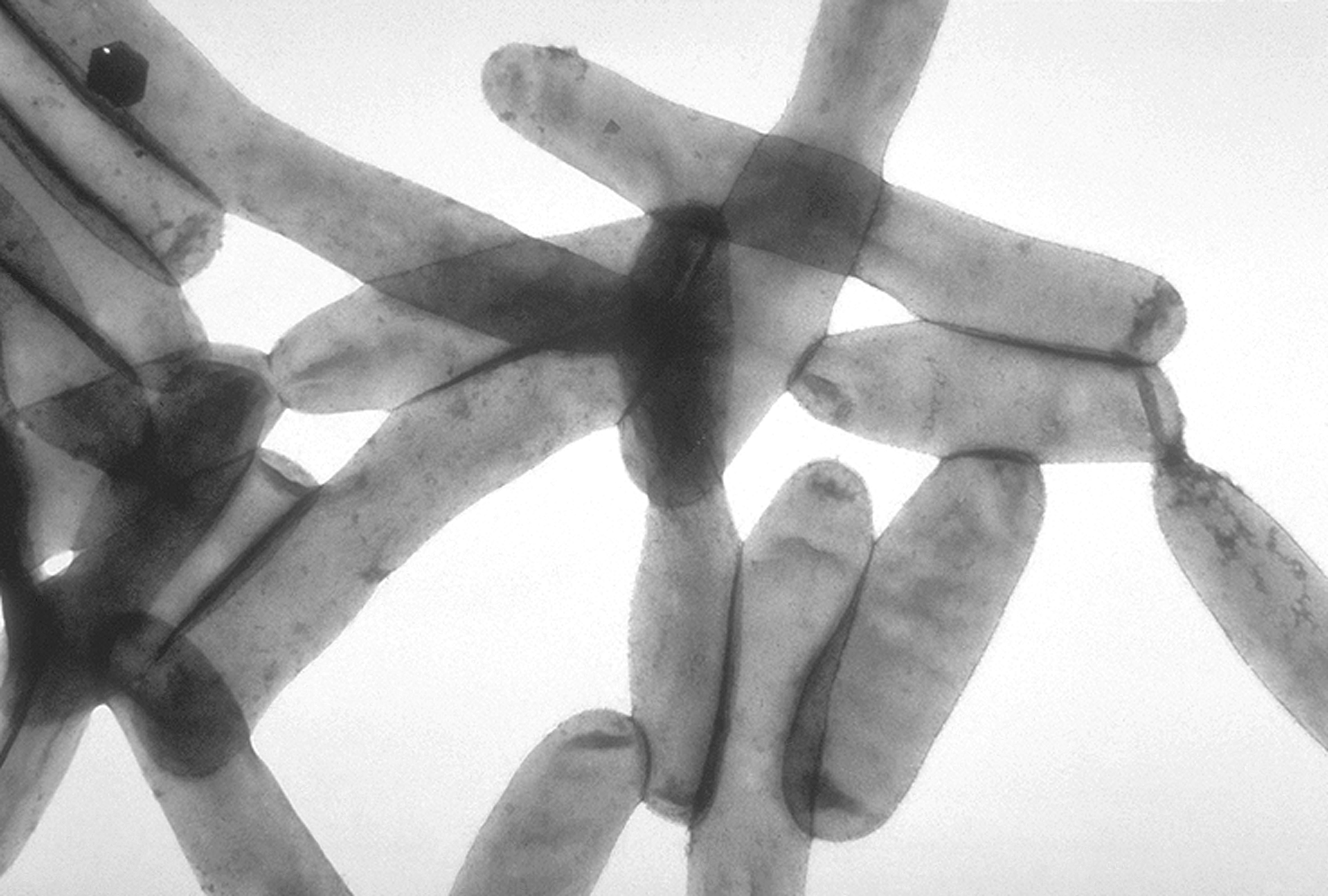

Scientific classification
- Domain: Bacteria
- Kingdom: Pseudomonadati
- Phylum: Pseudomonadota
- Class: Gammaproteobacteria
- Order: Legionellales
- Family: Legionellaceae
- Genus: Legionella
- Species: L. busanensis

Binomial name
- Legionella busanensis Park et al. 2003

Type strain
- ATCC BAA-518, CIP 108685, K9951, KCTC 12084

= Legionella busanensis =

Species of bacterium

Legionella busanensis is a Gram-negative, catalase- and oxidase-positive bacterium from the genus Legionella with a single subpolar flagellum, which was isolated from cooling tower water in Busan in Korea.
