= Legionella nautarum =

Scientific classification
- Domain: Bacteria
- Kingdom: Pseudomonadati
- Phylum: Pseudomonadota
- Class: Gammaproteobacteria
- Order: Legionellales
- Family: Legionellaceae
- Genus: Legionella
- Species: L. nautarum

Binomial name
- Legionella nautarum Dennis et al. 1993

Type strain
- ATCC 49506, CCUG 44900, CIP 105270, NCTC 12375, Thacker 1224

Species of bacterium

Legionella nautarum is a Gram-negative bacterium from the genus Legionella which was isolated from a hot water tap in London.
