= Legionella parisiensis =

Scientific classification
- Domain: Bacteria
- Kingdom: Pseudomonadati
- Phylum: Pseudomonadota
- Class: Gammaproteobacteria
- Order: Legionellales
- Family: Legionellaceae
- Genus: Legionella
- Species: L. parisiensis

Binomial name
- Legionella parisiensis Brenner et al. 1985

Type strain
- ATCC 35299, CCUG 29670, CIP 103847, DSM 19216, JCM 7561, NCTC 11983, PF-209C-C2

Species of bacterium

Legionella parisiensis is a Gram-negative bacterium from the genus Legionella associated with pneumonia.

== History ==
This species was isolated from cooling tower water in Paris. In 1997, it was first associated with human pneumonia in a liver transplant patient.
