= Legionella yabuuchiae =

Scientific classification
- Domain: Bacteria
- Kingdom: Pseudomonadati
- Phylum: Pseudomonadota
- Class: Gammaproteobacteria
- Order: Legionellales
- Family: Legionellaceae
- Genus: Legionella
- Species: L. yabuuchiae

Binomial name
- Legionella yabuuchiae Kuroki et al. 2007

Type strain
- DSM 18492, JCM 14148, OA1-2

Species of bacterium

Legionella yabuuchiae is a bacterium from the genus Legionella which was isolated from industrial wastes in contaminated soils in Japan.
