= Legionella brunensis =

Scientific classification
- Domain: Bacteria
- Kingdom: Pseudomonadati
- Phylum: Pseudomonadota
- Class: Gammaproteobacteria
- Order: Legionellales
- Family: Legionellaceae
- Genus: Legionella
- Species: L. brunensis

Binomial name
- Legionella brunensis Wilkinson et al. 1989

Type strain
- ATCC 43878, BCRC 17046, CCRC 17046, CCUG 31114, CDC 1635-CZK-E, CIP 103874, DSM 19236, NCTC 12240

Species of bacterium

Legionella brunensis is a Gram-negative, non-spore-forming, aerobic bacterium from the genus Legionella, which was isolated from cooling tower water in Czechoslovakia.
