= C13orf46 =

C13of46 Gene and Protein

Identifiers
- Aliases: C13orf46, uncharacterized LOC100507747, chromosome 13 open reading frame 46
- External IDs: GeneCards: C13orf46

Gene location (Human)
Chr.	Chromosome 13 (human)
Band	13q34	Start	113,953,705 bp
Band	13q34	End	113,974,076 bp
RNA expression pattern
Bgee	Human / Mouse (ortholog); Top expressed in: sural nerve; body of pancreas; left testis; right testis; body of stomach; upper lobe of left lung; fundus; left lobe of thyroid gland; right lobe of thyroid gland; stromal cell of endometrium / n/a; More reference expression data
BioGPS	n/a
Orthologs
Databases	NCBI: entry; OMA: entry
Species	Human	Mouse
Entrez	100507747	n/a
Ensembl	ENSG00000283302; ENSG00000283199	n/a
UniProt	n a	n/a
RefSeq (mRNA)	NM_001365455	n/a
RefSeq (protein)	n/a	n/a
Location (UCSC)	Chr 13: 113.95 – 113.97 Mb	n/a
PubMed search		n/a
- Wikidata
View/Edit Human

Chromosome 13 Open Reading Frame 46 is a protein which in humans is encoded by the C13orf46 gene. In humans, C13orf46 is ubiquitously expressed at low levels in tissues, including the lungs, stomach, prostate, spleen, and thymus. This gene encodes eight alternatively spliced mRNA transcript, which produce five different protein isoforms.

== Gene ==
An alternative name for C13orf46 is LOC100507747. C13orf46 spans 47,563 base pairs, contains 11 exons, and is on the minus strand of chromosome 13 at 13q34.

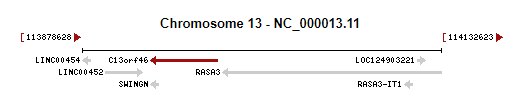
Graphical representation of the location of the human C13orf46 gene. The red arrow pointing to the left represents the span of the gene C13orf46.

=== Gene neighbors ===
The neighboring genes around C13orf46 include LINC00454, LINC00452, SWINGN, RASA3, and LOC124903221.

LINC00454 and LINC00452 (Long Intergenic NonProtein Coding RNA 454 & 452) are both long non-coding RNAs (lncRNA) that regulate epigenetic gene expression, chromatin remodeling, and levels of gene transcription and translation. Both LINC00454 and LINC00452 expression are restricted to the testis. LINC00454 has been associated with Factor X Deficiency while LINC00452 has been found to promote ovarian carcinogenesis.

SWINGN (SWI/SNF Complex Interacting GAS6 Enhancer Non-Coding RNA) is also a lncRNA that neighbors C13orf46. SWINGN regulates the activation of the GAS6 (Growth Arrest Specific 6) oncogene, by interacting with matrix associated and actin dependent regulators of chromatin.

The RASA3 (RAS p21 Protein Activator 3) gene encodes the Ras GTPase activating protein. This protein binds inositol 1,3,4,5-tetrakisphosphate to stimulate the activity of Ras p21 and negatively regulates the Ras signaling pathway. RASA3 is most highly expressed in fat, lymph nodes, and the spleen. The encoded protein is localized to the cell membrane.

== mRNA ==
Eight different transcript variants have been identified for C13orf46. These transcript variants are alternatively spliced to include variations of 11 different exons. Depending on the different transcript variant that is translated, 5 different possible protein isoforms are encoded by C13orf46. The most common protein product encoded by C13orf46 is isoform 1, which is 212 amino acids long.

Table of Variants and Exons
Transcript Variant	mRNA Length (nt)	Protein Isoform	Protein Length (aa)	Molecular Weight (kDA)	Exon 1 (bp)	Exon 2 (bp)	Exon 3 (bp)	Exon 4 (bp)	Exon 5 (bp)	Exon 6 (bp)	Exon 7 (bp)	Exon 8 (bp)	Exon 9 (bp)	Exon 10 (bp)	Exon 11 (bp)
C13orf46 transcript variant 1	3786	C13orf46 protein isoform 1	212	23.4	269	52	166	48	48	68	3135				
C13orf46 transcript variant X1	26461	C13orf46 protein isoform X1	624	66.7								3269	252	1920	21020
C13orf46 transcript variant X2	26389	C13orf46 protein isoform X1	624	66.7								3269	252	20903	1965
C13orf46 transcript variant X3	25642	C13orf46 protein isoform X1	624	66.7								3269	252	19745	2376
C13orf46 transcript variant X4	26573	C13orf46 protein isoform X2	587	62.8								3269	252	23052	
C13orf46 transcript variant X5	29437	C13orf46 protein isoform X3	212	23.4	269	52	166	48	48	68	3337	25449			
C13orf46 transcript variant X6	961	C13orf46 protein isoform X4	192	21.1	269	52	166	48	48	68	310				
C13orf46 transcript variant X7	833	C13orf46 protein isoform X5	175	18.9	269	52	166	48	246	52					

== Protein ==
The primary protein isoform of the C13orf46 gene consists of 212 amino acids. The longest encoded isoform, known as C13orf46 protein isoform X1, is 624 amino acids long. Other protein isoforms encoded by the C13orf46 gene are similar to either of these two versions of the C13orf46 protein. Varying forms of the primary 212 amino acid protein is encoded by transcript variants 1, X5, X6, and X7. Variations of the longest C13orf46 protein isoform are encoded by transcript variants X1, X2, X3, and X4.

=== Protein isoform 1 ===
==== Properties and composition ====
C13orf46 Isoform 1 has a theoretical isoelectric point of 4.84 and a predicted molecular weight of 23.4 kDA. Higher relative amounts of glutamic acid (15.1%) and aspartic acid (7.5%) are found within this isoform, while the amino acids phenylalanine (0.9%) and threonine (0.5%) are found to be less abundant within the protein composition. C13orf46 Isoform 1 also has a glutamic acid rich region where multiple glutamic acid and lysine doublets are present, some of which occur side by side. A total of 14 multiplets are found within the protein overall, 12 of which are charged. C13orf46 Isoform 1 is not predicted to contain any charge clusters, hydrophobic segments, or transmembrane segments.

==== Structure ====
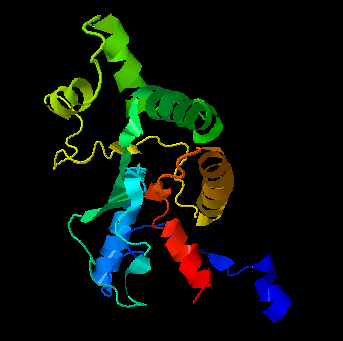
iTASSER predicted tertiary structure of C13orf46 Isoform 1.

C13orf46 Protein Isoform 1 is predicted to consist of 7 alpha helices and 2 beta strands in addition to regions of random free coils.

==== Domains and motifs ====
C13orf46 Isoform 1 has two identified disordered regions spanning between amino acid residues 1 through 148 and 168 to 190. In addition, C13orf46 Isoform 1 has a glutamic acid rich region spanning along amino acid residues 109 to 191.

==== Regulation and post translational modifications ====
C13orf46 Isoform 1 is predicted to undergo several post-translational modifications such as phosphorylation, O-GlcNAcylation, mucin type GalNAc O-glycosylation, palmitoylation, and sumoylation. PKA, PKC, CKII, PKG, GSK3, cdc2, RSK, and ATM are kinases that are predicted to bind and phosphorylate the human C13orf46 Isoform 1. There is also one predicted phosphoprotein-binding phosphosite on the protein.

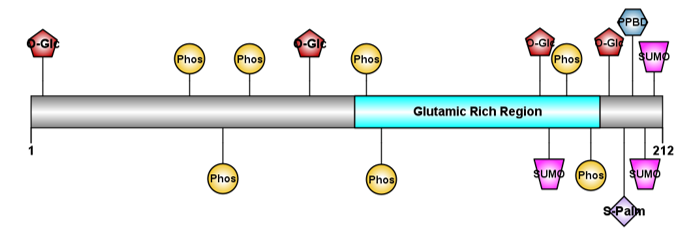
Schematic illustration of C13orf46 Isoform 1 annotated with relevant predicted post translational modifications. Red pentagons represent predicted relevant O-glycosylation sites, yellow spheres represent significant phosphorylation sites, and pink trapezoids represent predicted sumoylation sites. The predicted significant site of palmitoylation is represented by a purple diamond, while the phosphoprotein-binding phosphosite is depicted with a blue hexagon. A glutamic acid rich region within C13orf46 Isoform 1 is shown as a blue domain between amino acids 109 to 191

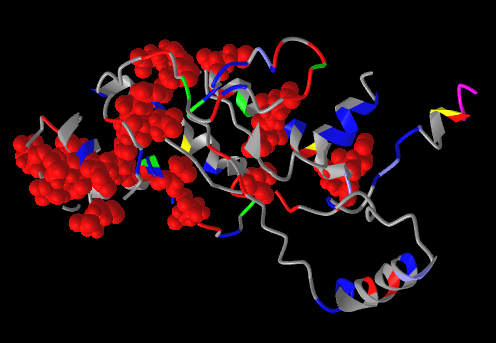
C13orf46 Isoform 1 annotated tertiary structure prediction from iTASSER with highest confidence score. Glutamic acid within the glutamic acid rich region is shown as spheres. The magenta highlights the N-terminal UBR box recognition site for E3 ubiquitin ligases. The green highlights show selected phosphorylation sites that are most conserved and relevant significant predictions based on scores and cross referencing predictions between site tools. The sections highlighted in yellow indicate locations within the protein where O-linked glycosylation may occur. These sections were selected based on comparisons between site prediction tools, score values, and comparisons with orthologs.

=== Protein isoform X1 ===
==== Properties ====
C13orf46 Isoform X1 has a theoretical isoelectric point of 9.33 and a predicted molecular weight of 66.7 kDA. C13orf46 Isoform X1 protein contains much higher relative amounts of serine (18.4%) and leucine (18.8%) compared to other human proteins and also has high amounts of proline (14.4%). Roughly equal amounts of serine and leucine are found within the protein. C13orf46 Isoform X1 protein is also composed of lower than usual amounts of glutamic acid (1.3%), phenylalanine (0.3%), and lysine (0.5%) and also has low amounts of valine (2.4%). Asparagine is not found within the C13orf46 Isoform X1 protein. Within this isoform, 100 amino acid multiplets are found, 5 of which are charged. No charge clusters, hydrophobic segments or transmembrane domains are predicted within the protein.

==== Structure ====
C13orf46 Isoform X1 is predicted to consist of a combination of alpha helices, beta sheets, and free random coil regions. There are 22 predicted alpha helices and 18 predicted beta sheets within the predicted structure of C13orf46 Isoform X1.

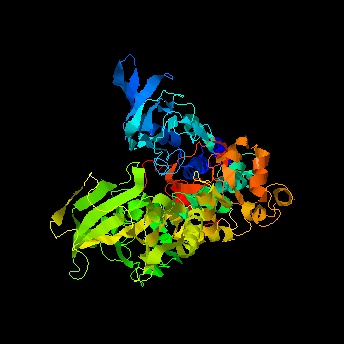
iTASSER predicted tertiary structure of C13orf46 Isoform X1

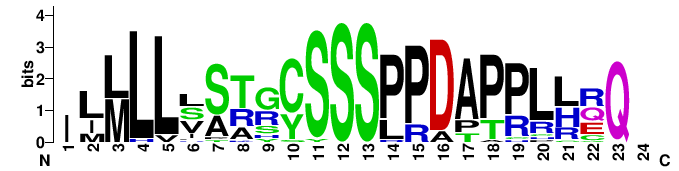
Logo of 26 repeats within C13orf46 Isoform X1

C13orf46 Isoform X1 contains a series of 26 repeats, which vary in sequence structure and length. Out of the 26 identified repeat sequences, 14 sequences consisted of 20 amino acids, while 5 of the repeats consisted of 21 amino acids, 3 repeats consisted of 22 amino acids, and 4 repeats were 23 amino acids long. Each repeat sequence beings with either the amino acid methionine, isoleucine, or leucine. The main sequence structure of the amino acids within the 26 repeats is MLLLSTGCSSSPPDAPPLHQ. An alignment of the 26 repeats indicate that the most conserved part of the repeat sequence occurs in the middle of the sequences with a triplet of the amino acid serine.

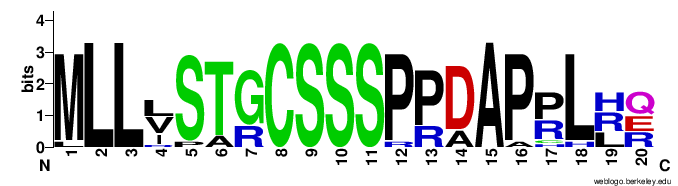
Logo the 14 repeats out of all 26 repeats within C13orf46 Isoform X1 consisting of only 20 amino acids, illuminating the main internal structure of the 26 repeats.

==== Domains and motifs ====
C13orf46 Isoform X1 has a predicted a dimerization domain between amino acids residues 69 to 87.

==== Regulation and post translational modification ====
C13orf46 Isoform X1 is predicted to undergo several post-translational modifications such as phosphorylation, O-GlcNAcylation, mucin type GalNAc O-glycosylation, palmitoylation, and sumoylation. The human C13orf46 Isoform X1 protein also has 11 predicted PPBD-specific binding phosphosites. The most conserved phosphorylation sites occur on the third serine of 23 out of 26 repeats. PKC, PKG, PKA, p38MAPK, GSK3, DNAPK, CKI, cdk5, CKII, and cdc2 are kinases predicted to bind and phosphorylate the human C13orf46 Isoform X1 protein. Predicted phosphorylated sites are also predicted to be sites where O-glycosylation can occur.

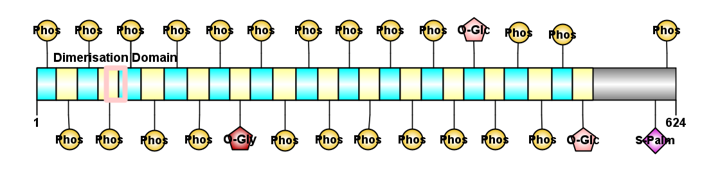
Schematic diagram of predicted significant post translational modifications of C13orf46 Isoform X1. The 26 repeats are shown in alternating color. Predicted phosphorylation sites of CKII are represented by yellow spheres. Three repeats that do not have a predicted to be phosphosite by CKII but are predicted O-GlcNAcylated and/or GalNAc O-glycosylated are depicted as pentagons. Two sites that are only predicted to be O-GlcNAcylated are shown in light pink, while the site predicted to have the potential to be both O-GlcNAcylated and GalNAc O-glycosylated is illustrated in red. A predicted dimerization domain is highlighted by a pink box. One significant s-palmitoylation site predicted on the protein is represented by a purple diamond.

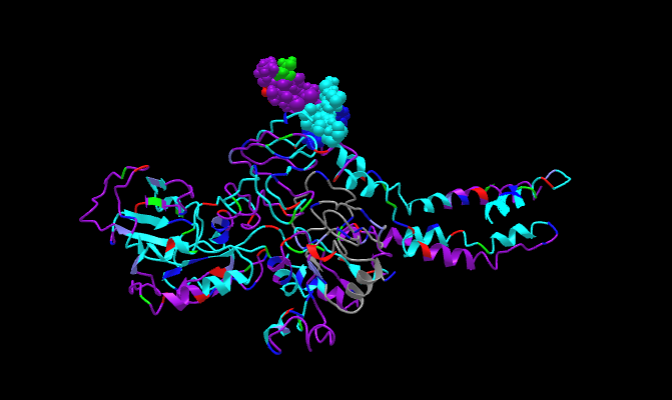
Annotated tertiary structure of C13orf46 depicting charge and hydrophobic regions within the protein. The serine's that are predicted to be phosphorylated by CKII are illustrated in green. The dimerization domain predicted between amino acids 69 to 87 are depicted as spheres. The 26 repeats are highlighted and shown in alternating color of blue and purple.

==== Protein interactions ====
C13orf46 protein isoform X1 has several predicted S-phase cyclin binding sites, in addition to MAPK and p38 interacting motifs.

== Expression ==
RNA sequencing shows the expression of C13orf46 is most observed in the lungs, prostate, pancreas, and stomach at intermediate levels. C13orf46 also has lower expression levels in the bone marrow, spleen, thyroid, lymph node, gall bladder, and thymus.

=== Cellular localization ===
C13orf46 Isoform 1 is predicted to be mostly localized within the nucleus. This protein isoform may also be localized on the cell membrane. C13orf46 Isoform X1 is predicted to be mostly localized within the nucleus or cytoplasm.

== Homology ==
=== Orthologs ===
The C13orf46 gene has orthologs to the human C13orf46 isoform 1 protein and C13orf46 isoform X1 protein, found within primates, mammals, birds, reptiles, fish, and invertebrates.

==== Isoform 1 ====
Orthologs to the human C13orf46 isoform 1 protein are only known to be found in primates and mammals, suggesting that this part of the C13orf46 gene encoding the C13orf46 isoform 1 protein appeared around 99 million years ago.

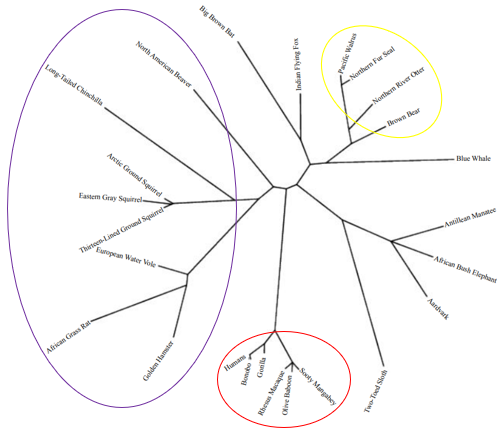
Unrooted phylogenetic tree of C13orf46 isoform 1 evolutionary history. Circles indicate species groups of like taxons. The red circle highlights primates, the yellow circle indicates carnivores, and the purple circle indicates rodents.

Table of Orthologs to Human Protein C13orf46 Isoform 1
Genus and species	Common name	Taxonomic group	Median Date of Divergence (mya)	Accession #	Sequence length (aa)	Sequence identity (%)	Sequence similarity (%)
Homo sapiens	Human	Primates	0	NP_001352384.1	212	100.0%	100.0%
Pan paniscus	Bonobo	Primates	6.4	XP_034792262.1	212	98.1%	98.1%
Gorilla gorilla gorilla	Western Lowland Gorilla	Primates	8.6	XP_030857272.1	212	95.3%	98.1%
Papio anubis	Olive Baboon	Primates	28.9	XP_021785522.1	212	88.7%	92.5%
Cercocebus atys	Sooty Mangabey	Primates	28.9	XP_011913555.1	192	87.3%	91.0%
Macaca mulatta	Rhesus Macaque	Primates	28.9	XP_014977020.1	192	79.2%	82.5%
Ursus arctos	Brown Bear	Carnivora	87	XP_048071403.1	222	59.2%	71.3%
Callorhinus ursinus	Northern Fur Seal	Carnivora	87	XP_025730354.1	184	57.5%	65.6%
Lontra canadensis	Northern River Otter	Carnivora	87	XP_032736869.1	232	46.4%	53.6%
Odobenus rosmarus divergens	Pacific Walrus	Carnivora	87	XP_004412327.1	310	36.4%	41.7%
Loxodonta africana	African Bush Elephant	Proboscidea	87	XP_010591994.1	214	62.6%	73.4%
Choloepus didactylus	Two-Toed Sloth	Pilosa	87	XP_037662557.1	214	60.7%	73.8%
Orycteropus afer afer	Aardvark	Tubulidentata	87	XP_007940592.1	214	60.0%	69.3%
Castor canadensis	North American Beaver	Rodentia	87	XP_020020073.1	217	59.6%	72.0%
Pteropus giganteus	Indian Flying Fox	Chiroptera	94	XP_039734682.1	213	67.6%	76.5%
Eptesicus fuscus	Big Brown Bat	Chiroptera	94	XP_028004567.1	214	65.9%	75.2%
Trichechus manatus latirostris	Antillean Manatee	Sirenia	94	XP_023589319.1	214	63.1%	74.3%
Balaenoptera musculus	Blue Whale	Cetacea	94	XP_036687016.1	207	57.3%	69.0%
Urocitellus parryii	Arctic Ground Squirrel	Rodentia	94	XP_026237314.1	216	61.9%	72.0%
Sciurus carolinensis	Eastern Gray Squirrel	Rodentia	94	XP_047409299.1	238	55.6%	66.1%
Ictidomys tridecemlineatus	Thirteen-Lined Ground Squirrel	Rodentia	94	XP_013221671.2	276	49.3%	57.6%
Chinchilla lanigera	Long-Tailed Chinchilla	Rodentia	99	XP_005373979.1	217	55.5%	66.4%
Arvicola amphibius	European Water Vole	Rodentia	99	XP_038185081.1	237	53.1%	65.1%
Mesocricetus auratus	Golden Hamster	Rodentia	99	XP_005082676.1	237	51.0%	61.8%
Arvicanthis niloticus	African Grass Rat	Rodentia	99	XP_034376776.1	241	50.0%	61.9%

==== Isoform X1 ====
Predicted orthologs to the human C13orf46 isoform X1 protein are found in primates, mammals, birds, reptiles, fish, and as far as back as invertebrates of the bacterial phylum Legionella.

Table of Predicted Orthologs to Human Protein C13orf46 Isoform X1
Genus and species	Common name	Taxonomic group	Median Date of Divergence (mya)	Accession #	Sequence length (aa)	Sequence identity (%)	Sequence similarity (%)
Homo sapiens	Human	Primates	0	XP_047285937.1	624	100.0%	100.0%
Pan troglodytes	Chimpanzee	Primates	6.4	XP_024209271.1	720	54.9%	61.0%
Microtus ochrogaster	Prairie Vole	Rodentia	87	KAH0512811.1	936	10.3%	15.8%
Phoca vitulina	European Harbour Seal	Carnivora	94	XP_032285971.1	510	18.8%	30.1%
Orcinus orca	Killer Whale	Cetacea	94	XP_049556886.1	348	14.2%	19.3%
Myotis davidii	Whiskered Bat	Chiroptera	94	ELK34143.1	530	26.1%	33.6%
Phasianus colchicus	Ring-Necked Pheasant	Galliformes	319	XP_031464934.1	499	23.2%	33.5%
Corvus hawaiiensis	Hawaiian Crow	Passeriformes	319	XP_048182949.1	316	17.3%	23.4%
Hirundo rustica	Barn Swallow	Passeriformes	319	XP_039927228.1	1185	10.0%	14.9%
Pelodiscus sinensis	Chinese Soft-Shelled Turtle	Testudines	319	XP_025042872.1	554	17.3%	26.4%
Rana temporaria	Grass Frog	Anura	353	XP_040201915.1	1147	12.9%	19.7%
Bufo bufo	Common Toad	Anura	353	XP_040296088.1	259	12.3%	19.7%
Lithobates catesbeianus	American Bullfrog	Anura	353	PIO00716.1	245	12.0%	18.5%
Larimichthys crocea	Large Yellow Croaker	Perciformes	431	KAE8277666.1	478	28.9%	37.9%
Coregonus clupeaformis	Lake Whitefish	Salmoniformes	431	XP_041725148.2	609	27.0%	26.0%
Austrofundulus limnaeus	Killifish	Cyprinodontiformes	431	XP_013856594.1	244	22.7%	25.4%
Oncorhynchus tshawytscha	Chinook Blackmouth Salmon	Salmoniformes	431	XP_042158955.1	714	23.5%	26.2%
Salmo salar	Atlantic Salmon	Salmoniformes	431	XP_045562793.1	324	19.9%	20.9%
Prochilodus magdalenae	Columbian Freshwater Fish	Characiformes	431	KAI4891011.1	388	18.6%	25.4%
Oncorhynchus mykiss	Rainbow Trout	Salmoniformes	431	XP_036845983.1	332	18.5%	27.3%
Chiloscyllium punctatum	Brownbanded Bamboo Shark	Orectolobiformes	464	GCC17506.1	625	26.7%	26.8%
Biomphalaria glabrata	Freshwater Snail	Basommatophora	694	KAI8768938.1	308	14.4%	18.9%
Bulinus truncatus	Freshwater Snail	Basommatophora	694	KAH9489149.1	879	10.3%	30.7%
Owenia fusiformis	Bristle Worm	Canalipalpata	694	CAH1787814.1	224	14.3%	15.2%
Legionella fallonii	Legionella	Legionellales	3036	WP_045095679.1	695	15.2%	30.7%

=== Paralogs ===
Human C13orf46 isoform X1 protein has one predicted paralog among mucins, specifically mucin-1. Mucins play a role in creating protective mucus barriers on epithelial tissues. The MUC1 gene is located on chromosome 1 at 1q22, contains 11 exons, and has 22 different isoforms. Mucins are highly O-glycosylated and contain tandem repeat domains abundant with proline, serine, and threonine. Surrounding the repeat domains are cysteine rich regions. Mucin genes do not always share a common ancestry, are prone to convergent evolution, and are grouped based on their functionality instead of common evolutionary history.
