= Legionella maceachernii =

Scientific classification
- Domain: Bacteria
- Kingdom: Pseudomonadati
- Phylum: Pseudomonadota
- Class: Gammaproteobacteria
- Order: Legionellales
- Family: Legionellaceae
- Genus: Legionella
- Species: L. maceachernii

Binomial name
- Legionella maceachernii Brenner et al. 1985

Type strain
- ATCC 35300, CCUG 31116, CDC PX-1-G2-E2, CIP 103846, DSM 16642, GIFU 10745, Gorman PX-1-G2-E2, JCM 7566, NCTC 11982, PX-1-G2-E2

Synonyms
- Tatlockia maceachernii

Species of bacterium

Legionella maceachernii is a Gram-negative bacterium from the genus Legionella which was isolated from a potable water cistern. L. maceachernii can cause pneumonia.
