= Thalassocella =

Scientific classification
- Domain: Bacteria
- Kingdom: Pseudomonadati
- Phylum: Pseudomonadota
- Class: Gammaproteobacteria
- Order: Cellvibrionales
- Family: Cellvibrionaceae
- Genus: Thalassocella; Lucena et al. 2020
- Species: T. subtropicalis

Binomial name
- Thalassocella subtropicalis Lucena et al. 2020

Genus of bacteria

Thalassocella is a genus of bacteria from the family of Phyllobacteriaceae, with one known species (Thalassocella subtropicalis).
