= Legionella sainthelensi =

Scientific classification
- Domain: Bacteria
- Kingdom: Pseudomonadati
- Phylum: Pseudomonadota
- Class: Gammaproteobacteria
- Order: Legionellales
- Family: Legionellaceae
- Genus: Legionella
- Species: L. sainthelensi

Binomial name
- Legionella sainthelensi Campbell et al. 1984

Type strain
- ATCC 35248, CCUG 29672, CIP 103885, DSM 19231, MSH-4, Mt. St. Helens 4, NCTC 11988

Species of bacterium

Legionella sainthelensi is a Gram-negative, catalase- and oxidase-positive, non-spore-forming, motile bacterium from the genus Legionella which was isolated from fresh water in regions influenced by the volcanic eruptions of Mount St. Helens in Washington. L. sainthelensi can cause infection in the respiratory tract.

Genomic information
- NCBI ID: 28087
- Ploidy: haploid
- Genome size: 4.10 Mb
- Number of chromosomes: 1
- Year of completion: 2014
