= Legionella norrlandica =

Scientific classification
- Domain: Bacteria
- Kingdom: Pseudomonadati
- Phylum: Pseudomonadota
- Class: Gammaproteobacteria
- Order: Legionellales
- Family: Legionellaceae
- Genus: Legionella
- Species: L. norrlandica

Binomial name
- Legionella norrlandica Rizzardi et al. 2015

Type strain
- ATCC BAA-2678, CCUG 65936, LEG 4237 III, LEGN

Species of bacterium

Legionella norrlandica is a bacterium from the genus Legionella which has been isolated from a biopurification system.
