= Legionella geestiana =

Scientific classification
- Domain: Bacteria
- Kingdom: Pseudomonadati
- Phylum: Pseudomonadota
- Class: Gammaproteobacteria
- Order: Legionellales
- Family: Legionellaceae
- Genus: Legionella
- Species: L. geestiana

Binomial name
- Legionella geestiana Dennis et al. 1993

Type strain
- ATCC 49504, CCUG 44893, CIP 105569, Dennis 1308, NCTC 12373

Species of bacterium

Legionella geestiana is a gram-negative bacterium from the genus Legionella.
