= Legionella tunisiensis =

Scientific classification
- Domain: Bacteria
- Kingdom: Pseudomonadati
- Phylum: Pseudomonadota
- Class: Gammaproteobacteria
- Order: Legionellales
- Family: Legionellaceae
- Genus: Legionella
- Species: L. tunisiensis

Binomial name
- Legionella tunisiensis Campocasso et al. 2012

Type strain
- CSUR P145, DSM 24805, LegM

Species of bacterium

Legionella tunisiensis is a Gram-negative bacterium from the genus Legionella isolated from hypersaline lake water from the Lake Sabkha in Tunisia.
