= Legionella londiniensis =

Scientific classification
- Domain: Bacteria
- Kingdom: Pseudomonadati
- Phylum: Pseudomonadota
- Class: Gammaproteobacteria
- Order: Legionellales
- Family: Legionellaceae
- Genus: Legionella
- Species: L. londiniensis

Binomial name
- Legionella londiniensis Dennis et al. 1993

Type strain
- ATCC 49505, CCUG 44895, CIP 105269, NCTC 12374, Thacker 1477

Species of bacterium

Legionella londiniensis is a Gram-negative bacterium from the genus Legionella which was isolated from hot spring water in Shizuoka in Japan.
