= Legionella oakridgensis =

Scientific classification
- Domain: Bacteria
- Kingdom: Pseudomonadati
- Phylum: Pseudomonadota
- Class: Gammaproteobacteria
- Order: Legionellales
- Family: Legionellaceae
- Genus: Legionella
- Species: L. oakridgensis

Binomial name
- Legionella oakridgensis Orrison et al. 1983

Species of bacterium

Legionella oakridgensis is a Gram-negative bacterium from the genus Legionella which was isolated from industrial cooling tower waters. It is pathogenic.

Genomic information
- NCBI genome ID: 24057
- Ploidy: haploid
- Genome size: 2.77 Mb
- Number of chromosomes: 1
- Year of completion: 2013
