= Legionella drancourtii =

Scientific classification
- Domain: Bacteria
- Kingdom: Pseudomonadati
- Phylum: Pseudomonadota
- Class: Gammaproteobacteria
- Order: Legionellales
- Family: Legionellaceae
- Genus: Legionella
- Species: L. drancourtii

Binomial name
- Legionella drancourtii La Scola et al. 2004

Type strain
- ATCC 50991, CCUG 111, LLAP 12

Species of bacterium

Legionella drancourtii is a Gram-negative bacterium from the genus Legionella which occurs in nature as a strictly intracellular parasite of free-living amoebae. It is named after Michel Drancourt.
