= Legionella cardiaca =

Scientific classification
- Domain: Bacteria
- Kingdom: Pseudomonadati
- Phylum: Pseudomonadota
- Class: Gammaproteobacteria
- Order: Legionellales
- Family: Legionellaceae
- Genus: Legionella
- Species: L. cardiaca

Binomial name
- Legionella cardiaca Pearce, et al., 2012

Type strain
- ATCC BAA-2315, DSM 25049, H63, JCM 17854

Species of bacterium

Legionella cardiaca is a Gram-negative, non-spore-forming, aerobic, rod-shaped bacterium from the genus Legionella. It was isolated from the aortic valve of a patient with endocarditis.
