= Legionella taurinensis =

Scientific classification
- Domain: Bacteria
- Kingdom: Pseudomonadati
- Phylum: Pseudomonadota
- Class: Gammaproteobacteria
- Order: Legionellales
- Family: Legionellaceae
- Genus: Legionella
- Species: L. taurinensis

Binomial name
- Legionella taurinensis Lo Presti et al. 1999

Type strain
- ATCC 700508, CCUG 44901, CIP 106300, Turin I No. 1

Species of bacterium

Legionella taurinensis is a Gram-negative, oxidase- and catalase-positive bacterium from the genus Legionella with a single polar flagellum which was isolated from a water from a hospital oxygen bubble humidifier in Turin in Italy.
