= Legionella rubrilucens =

Scientific classification
- Domain: Bacteria
- Kingdom: Pseudomonadati
- Phylum: Pseudomonadota
- Class: Gammaproteobacteria
- Order: Legionellales
- Family: Legionellaceae
- Genus: Legionella
- Species: L. rubrilucens

Binomial name
- Legionella rubrilucens Brenner et al. 1985

Type strain
- ATCC 35304, CCUG 29671, CIP 103848, DSM 11884, JCM 7565, NCTC 11987, WA-270A-C2

Species of bacterium

Legionella rubrilucens is a Gram-negative bacterium from the genus Legionella which was isolated from tap water in Los Angeles, hot spring water in Niigata in Japan, and a patient who suffered from pneumonia.
