= Legionella impletisoli =

Scientific classification
- Domain: Bacteria
- Kingdom: Pseudomonadati
- Phylum: Pseudomonadota
- Class: Gammaproteobacteria
- Order: Legionellales
- Family: Legionellaceae
- Genus: Legionella
- Species: L. impletisoli

Binomial name
- Legionella impletisoli Kuroki et al. 2007

Type strain
- DSM 18493, JCM 13919, OA1-1

Species of bacterium

Legionella impletisoli is a Gram-negative bacterium from the genus Legionella which was isolated from soils which were contaminated with industrial wastes in Japan.
