= Legionella worsleiensis =

Scientific classification
- Domain: Bacteria
- Kingdom: Pseudomonadati
- Phylum: Pseudomonadota
- Class: Gammaproteobacteria
- Order: Legionellales
- Family: Legionellaceae
- Genus: Legionella
- Species: L. worsleiensis

Binomial name
- Legionella worsleiensis Dennis et al. 1993

Type strain
- ATCC 49508, CCUG 44923, CIP 105114, CIP 105114.95/83-1347, NCTC 12377

Species of bacterium

Legionella worsleiensis is a bacterium from the genus Legionella which was isolated from industrial cooling tower in Worsley in England.
