= Legionella tucsonensis =

Scientific classification
- Domain: Bacteria
- Kingdom: Pseudomonadati
- Phylum: Pseudomonadota
- Class: Gammaproteobacteria
- Order: Legionellales
- Family: Legionellaceae
- Genus: Legionella
- Species: L. tucsonensis

Binomial name
- Legionella tucsonensis Thacker et al. 1990

Type strain
- 1087-AZ-H, ATCC 49180, CCUG 31119, CIP 105113, DSM 19246, NCTC 12439

Species of bacterium

Legionella tucsonensis is a Gram-negative bacterium from the genus Legionella with a single polar flagellum, which was isolated from the pleural fluid of a renal transplant patient with immunosuppressive therapy in Tucson, Arizona.
