= Legionella birminghamensis =

Scientific classification
- Domain: Bacteria
- Kingdom: Pseudomonadati
- Phylum: Pseudomonadota
- Class: Gammaproteobacteria
- Order: Legionellales
- Family: Legionellaceae
- Genus: Legionella
- Species: L. birminghamensis

Binomial name
- Legionella birminghamensis Wilkinson et al. 1988

Type strain
- 1407-AL-H, ATCC 43702, BCRC 17042, CCRC 17042, CCUG 31233 A, CIP 103871, DSM 19232, GIFU 11749, JCM 7559, KCTC 12007, NCTC 12437

Species of bacterium

Legionella birminghamensis is a Gram-negative, non-spore-forming, aerobic bacterium from the genus Legionella, which was isolated from a cardiac transplant recipient and from water near Clermont-Ferrand in France. It was named after Birmingham, Alabama.
