= Legionella santicrucis =

Scientific classification
- Domain: Bacteria
- Kingdom: Pseudomonadati
- Phylum: Pseudomonadota
- Class: Gammaproteobacteria
- Order: Legionellales
- Family: Legionellaceae
- Genus: Legionella
- Species: L. santicrucis

Binomial name
- Legionella santicrucis Brenner et al. 1985

Type strain
- ATCC 35301, CCUG 29673, CIP 103849, DSM 19325, JCM 7557, NCTC 11989, NCTC 35301, SC-63-C7

Species of bacterium

Legionella santicrucis is a Gram-negative bacterium from the genus Legionella, which was isolated from tap water in St. Croix on the Virgin Islands.
