= Legionella cincinnatiensis =

Scientific classification
- Domain: Bacteria
- Kingdom: Pseudomonadati
- Phylum: Pseudomonadota
- Class: Gammaproteobacteria
- Order: Legionellales
- Family: Legionellaceae
- Genus: Legionella
- Species: L. cincinnatiensis

Binomial name
- Legionella cincinnatiensis Thacker et al. 1989

Type strain
- 72-OH-0, ATCC 43753, BCRC 17047, CCRC 17047, CCUG 31230 A, CIP 103875, DSM 19233, NCTC 12438

Species of bacterium

Legionella cincinnatiensis is a Gram-negative, non-spore-forming, aerobic bacterium from the genus Legionella which was isolated in Cincinnati from an open lung biopsy specimen from a patient who had hemodialysis because of an end-stage renal disease and suffered from bronchopneumonia.
