= Legionella cherrii =

Scientific classification
- Domain: Bacteria
- Kingdom: Pseudomonadati
- Phylum: Pseudomonadota
- Class: Gammaproteobacteria
- Order: Legionellales
- Family: Legionellaceae
- Genus: Legionella
- Species: L. cherrii

Binomial name
- Legionella cherrii

Type strain
- ATCC 35252, BCRC 17044, CCRC 17044, CCUG 29666, CIP 103842, DSM 19213, NCTC 11976, ORW

Species of bacterium

Legionella cherrii is an aerobic, flagellated, Gram-negative bacterium from the genus Legionella. It was isolated from a heated water sample in Minnesota. L. cherrii is similar to another Legionella species, L. pneumophila, and is believed to cause major respiratory problems.

== History ==
=== Discovery ===
The bacterium was first discovered in 1982 by R. L. Tyndall and C. B. Duncan, who were a part of D.J. Brenner's team that discovered ten new species of Legionella. The isolation process initiated after collecting water samples and transferring them into guinea pig tissues before plating them onto buffered charcoal yeast extract agar. Afterwards, L. cherrii strains were cultured around 36 °C in an environment containing 2.5% carbon dioxide.

=== Etymology ===
The genus Legionella is named after the 1976 pneumonia (Legionella pneumophila) outbreak at the American Legion convention at The Bellevue-Stratford Hotel in Philadelphia. The genus was previously unknown, but it was established three years later. The specific term cherrii is derived from the scientist William B. Cherry due to his contributions on the studies of Legionellae.

== Characterization and genomics ==
Genomic information
- NCBI ID: 28084
- Ploidy: haploid
- Genome size: 3.71 Mb
- Number of chromosomes: 1
- Year of completion: 2014

Legionella cherrii is rod-shaped and considered an oxidase-negative bacterium since it lacks cytochrome c oxidase and does not use oxygen in its electron transport chain. L. cherrii also has the ability to autofluoresce a bluish-white color which was tested by placing the specimen under a Woods lamp-a mechanism that uses backlight to highlight bacteria-and measured under 366 nm wavelengths. L. cherrii lacks the ability to reduce nitrate, does not contain a urease, and does not convert D-glucose to acid. However, L. cherrii can hydrolyze gelatin. When on a yeast extract agar plate, L. cherrii forms a dissolvable brown pigment containing tyrosine. One or a few flagella aid them in their motility. Legionella organisms’ dependence on L-cysteine and their unique fatty acids and isoprenoid ubiquinone distinguish them from other aerobic bacteria. Like other Legionella species, L. cherrii does not form spores and is an aerobic, Gram-negative bacterium. The genome size was sequenced using Illumina HiSeq 2000 and found to be 3.7 Mb. Scaffold assembly was conducted using whole genome shotgun sequencing and 13 scaffolds were found in the complete genome. The G/C content for this particular species of Legionella is 38.8 mol%. About 3,111 protein coding genes, four rRNA genes, and 36 tRNA genes were also discovered in the genome.

== Ecology ==
Various strains of L. cherrii were isolated in different areas in 1982. Strains ORW, ORB, and ORZ were discovered in Minnesota in a heated water sample. Another isolate, SC-65-C3, was found in a potable water stern on the island of St. Croix in the Virgin Islands. Legionella species are mostly found in freshwater environments. However, various strains of Legionella can congregate in water filtration systems, air conditioning units, humidifiers, and equipment used to combat respiratory infections.

== Phylogeny ==
To determine previously classified Legionella species' relatedness to L. cherrii, Brenner et al. hybridized DNA reactions using an in vitro method with phosphate (^{32}PO_{4}). A similar percentage of 94% or higher was found between the four L. cherrii strains. Reassociation criteria differed between 60 and 75 °C depending on the optimal or stringent growth of the bacteria. None to 0.5% divergence was found in related sequences. L. steigerwaltii was related to L. cherrii the most, and exhibited a 67% relatedness percentage. Following L. steigerwalti, L. dumofii (57%), L. anisa (56%), L. bozemanii (51%), and L. gormanii (47%) showed these levels of similarity. Although L. parisiensis is an autofluorescent species like L. cherrii, it only had a 24% relatedness to L. cherrii. Compared to other Legionella species, L. cherrii is 6-35% related.

== Pathogenesis ==
Legionella cherrii and other Legionella species are considered to be intracellular bacteria that can cause major respiratory problems in humans. Infection occurs when a human host inhales the organism, which may be carried in humidified air. Distinguishing patients with Legionnaires' disease is difficult because most are asymptomatic due to Legionnaires' disease being similar to other types of pneumonia. Although L. pneumophila is the leading cause of Legionnaires' disease, other Legionella species (such as L. cherrii) likely are capable of causing this disease. The cultural growth period for Legionellae is typically 3–4 days. Lung biopsy or bronchoscopy is not necessary to obtain a clinical isolate from a human patient. Plated acidification or using BCYE agar increases the level of selectivity and allows easier access to collecting a Legionella sample from an infected human's sputum. Not much is known on how to treat Legionnaires' disease, but one way could be to reduce the amount of biofilm production the bacteria create.
