= Legionella israelensis =

Scientific classification
- Domain: Bacteria
- Kingdom: Pseudomonadati
- Phylum: Pseudomonadota
- Class: Gammaproteobacteria
- Order: Legionellales
- Family: Legionellaceae
- Genus: Legionella
- Species: L. israelensis

Binomial name
- Legionella israelensis Bercovier et al. 1986

Type strain
- ATCC 43119, Brenner Bercovier4, CCUG 31115, CIP 103879, DSM 19235, GIFU 11367, JCM 7560, KCTC 12008, NCTC 12010

Species of bacterium

Legionella israelensis is a Gram-negative, oxidase-negative, catalase-positive, motile bacterium from the genus Legionella which was isolated from water from an oxidation pond in Ga'ash in Israel.
