= Legionella massiliensis =

Scientific classification
- Domain: Bacteria
- Kingdom: Pseudomonadati
- Phylum: Pseudomonadota
- Class: Gammaproteobacteria
- Order: Legionellales
- Family: Legionellaceae
- Genus: Legionella
- Species: L. massiliensis

Binomial name
- Legionella massiliensis Campocasso et al. 2012

Type strain
- CSUR P146, DSM 24804, LegA

Species of bacterium

Legionella massiliensis is a Gram-negative bacterium from the genus Legionella which was isolated from water from a cooling tower in Bouches du Rhone in France.
