= Legionella clemsonensis =

Scientific classification
- Domain: Bacteria
- Kingdom: Pseudomonadati
- Phylum: Pseudomonadota
- Class: Gammaproteobacteria
- Order: Legionellales
- Family: Legionellaceae
- Genus: Legionella
- Species: L. clemsonensis

Binomial name
- Legionella clemsonensis Palmer et al. 2016

Species of bacterium

Legionella clemsonensis was isolated in 2006, but was described in 2016 by Clemson University researchers. It is a Gram-negative bacterium.

== Taxonomic and phylogenetic description ==
“Legionella” is named after the American Legion convention where the first outbreak occurred, killing 34 people and sickening 221 individuals in 1976. It occurred in Philadelphia during the convention for the association of the U.S. veterans. The specific name clemsonensis” derives from Clemson University, where undergraduates DNA-sequenced this new strain. Legionella has a correlation with another genus called Coxiella. Both cause lung infection that can eventually lead to pneumonia due to the intracellular bacteria in aerosols.

== Discovery ==
Based on physical characteristics, phylogenetic analysis, and membrane fatty-acid composition, the organism was found to represent a unique lineage within the Legionella bacteria. The specific strain for Legionella clemsonensis is D5610. It was named in honor of the research group of students from the Clemson’s Creative Inquiry. Legionella clemsonensis was first isolated in 2006 from the bronchial wash of a patient diagnosed with pneumonia. Bronchial washing is part of a bronchoscopy procedure. After being isolated and stored, strain D5610 was acquired by the Centers for Disease Control and Prevention (CDC), which sent 68 strains of Legionella, including strain D5610, for students to analyze at Clemson. When isolated, it was shown to be very similar to bacterial genus Legionella. Researchers stated "it was identified as Legionella based on sequencing, cellular fatty-acid analysis, biochemical reactions, and biofilm characterization." For a physical characterization of L.a clemsonensis, it was streaked for a single colony isolation using a charcoal yeast extract agar and required cysteine for primary isolation. No growth was shown, which is typical of Legionella strains. A characteristic of L. clemsonensis is that it has a single, polar flagellum. Researchers also used fatty-acid methyl-ester analyses to distinguish differences between the Legionella strains. Cellular fatty-acid composition was analyzed using a Sherlock microbial Identification System.

== Preliminary characterization ==
Legionella clemsonensis was determined as a special lineage within the genus Legionella based on its phylogenetic analysis and physical appearance. It is a Gram-negative bacterium that is rod-shaped with one polar flagellum to help it move around. The strain can grow between 26 and 45 °C, forming biofilms that are similar to L. pneumophila Philadelphia 1. The strain D5610 of L. clemsonensis shows a distinctive temperature constraint compared to many of the Legionella species that do not grow under 26 °C and a restriction of temperatures above 45 °C . Most Legionella species have the ability to grow as high as 63 °C and very slowly at temperatures as low as 5 °C. At both 37 and 26 °C, strain D5610 was found to grow more slowly than L. pneumophila Philadelphia 1, and it also formed a significant amount of pigment that was less produced. These attributes suggest that this isolation is a standard Legionella species, for which the name Legionella clemsonensis was used. Legionella is considered to be pathogenic in humans and is one of the leading outbreaks found in constructed water systems. Because the biofilms are the source, countless outbreaks that originated from water systems and the ability of a species to form biofilms both can contribute to L. clemonensis’s pathogenicity. The process of characterizing and sequencing the strain D5610 is still undergoing investigation. Because this strain is still being investigated, no specific metabolism has been shown for L. clemsonensis. Yet, Legionella’s usual metabolism is a facultative intracellular pathogen that increases in large numbers inside free-living amoebae, as well as macrophages and other protozoa. In water systems, the pathogen lives in low metabolic state in the biofilms. A known strain of Legionella called in vitro L. pneumophila does not grow on standard media such as blood agar, because of a pH of 6.9 and certain amino acids such as cysteine being required. Yet when these requirements are met, the growth in the aerobic conditions is still slow. Up to 5 days are needed for colonies to be produced. The genomics have yet to be stated for this particular strain of Legionella, as well as the habitats.

== Importance ==
Legionella clemsonensis is pathogenic; most Legionella species are commonly known to cause pneumonia. A feature that sets L. clemsonensis apart is that under ultraviolet light, it fluoresces green, which differs from other Legionella strains because they usually fluoresce blue, red, or yellow.
