= Legionella dumoffii =

Scientific classification
- Domain: Bacteria
- Kingdom: Pseudomonadati
- Phylum: Pseudomonadota
- Class: Gammaproteobacteria
- Order: Legionellales
- Family: Legionellaceae
- Genus: Legionella
- Species: L. dumoffii

Binomial name
- Legionella dumoffii Brenner et al. 1980,

Type strain
- ATCC 33279, BCRC 17048, CCRC 17048, CCUG 11881, CECT 7349, CIP 103876, DSM 17625, NCTC 11370, NY 23

Synonyms
- Fluoribacter dumoffii

Species of bacterium

Legionella dumoffii is a Gram-negative bacterium from the genus Legionella with a monopolar flagellum which was isolated from lung tissue of a patient who suffered from fatal pneumonia. L. dumoffii occurs in soil and freshwater environments and can cause human pneumonia and accidentally induce other diseases such as prosthetic valve endocarditis and septic arthritis.
