= Legionella steelei =

Scientific classification
- Domain: Bacteria
- Kingdom: Pseudomonadati
- Phylum: Pseudomonadota
- Class: Gammaproteobacteria
- Order: Legionellales
- Family: Legionellaceae
- Genus: Legionella
- Species: L. steelei

Binomial name
- Legionella steelei Edelstein et al. 2012

Type strain
- ATCC BAA-2169, IMVS 3113, IMVS 3376

Species of bacterium

Legionella steelei is a Gram-negative bacterium from the genus Legionella which was isolated from specimens of the respiratory tract of patients with bronchitis in California and South Australia.
