= Legionella spiritensis =

Scientific classification
- Domain: Bacteria
- Kingdom: Pseudomonadati
- Phylum: Pseudomonadota
- Class: Gammaproteobacteria
- Order: Legionellales
- Family: Legionellaceae
- Genus: Legionella
- Species: L. spiritensis

Binomial name
- Legionella spiritensis Brenner et al. 1985

Type strain
- ATCC 35249, Bibb HSH-9, CCUG 29715, CCUG 31118, CIP 103850, DSM 19324, JCM 7562, MSH-9, MSH-g, Mt. St. Helens, NCTC 11990

Species of bacterium

Legionella spiritensis is a Gram-negative bacterium from the genus Legionella which was isolated from the Spirit Lake near Mount St. Helens.
