= Legionella jamestowniensis =

Scientific classification
- Domain: Bacteria
- Kingdom: Pseudomonadati
- Phylum: Pseudomonadota
- Class: Gammaproteobacteria
- Order: Legionellales
- Family: Legionellaceae
- Genus: Legionella
- Species: L. jamestowniensis

Binomial name
- Legionella jamestowniensis Brenner et al. 1985

Type strain
- ATCC 35298, CCUG 29669, CIP 103845, DSM 19215, GIFU 10741, JA-26-G1-E2, JA-26-GI-E2, JCM 7590, NCTC 11981

Species of bacterium

Legionella jamestowniensis is a Gram-negative bacterium from the genus Legionella which was isolated from wet soil in Jamestown, New York.

Genomic information
- NCBI genome ID: 42081
- Ploidy: haploid
- Genome size: 3.37 Mb
- Number of chromosomes: 1
- Year of completion: 2015
