= Sentinel outlet =

A sentinel outlet in occupational safety and health is a water outlet that is chosen to have its temperature monitored so that risk from Legionella can be controlled. This is typically chosen to be the closest and furthest outlets from the water tank.
