= Plasticicumulans acidivorans =

Scientific classification
- Domain: Bacteria
- Phylum: Pseudomonadota
- Class: Gammaproteobacteria
- Order: incertae sedis
- Family: incertae sedis
- Genus: Plasticicumulans
- Species: P. acidivorans

Binomial name
- Plasticicumulans acidivorans Jiang et al. 2011

Type strain
- CBS 122990, DSM 23606, TUD-JY37

Species of bacterium

Plasticicumulans acidivorans is a bacterium from the genus Plasticicumulans.
