= Dead leg (plumbing) =

In plumbing, a dead leg is a section of piping that experiences little to no circulation, usually due to poorly designed redundant pipework. This can lead to stagnant fluid within the pipe, which can promote the growth of waterborne pathogens, particularly Legionella.

== Health Hazards ==
Legionella bacteria found in these sections can lead to Legionnaires' disease, a form of atypical pneumonia, which is fatal in approximately 10% of cases.

== Regulation ==
Regulation on dead legs remains mixed internationally.

In the United Kingdom, the Health and Safety Executive states that a dead leg should be removed or the system must be flushed at least weekly. In the United States, the CDC recommends dead legs are eliminated as part of a comprehensive water management programme. This programme also involves control measures such as flushing, cleaning, disinfection of pipes, and the monitoring of their temperature.

Despite warnings from the World Health Organisation, several countries have no regulation on dead legs, including India.
