= Pseudohongiella nitratireducens =

Scientific classification
- Domain: Bacteria
- Kingdom: Pseudomonadati
- Phylum: Pseudomonadota
- Class: Gammaproteobacteria
- Genus: Pseudohongiella
- Species: P. nitratireducens

Binomial name
- Pseudohongiella nitratireducens Xu et al. 2016

Type strain
- CGMCC 1.15425, KCTC 52155, MCCC 1K03186, SCS-111

Species of bacterium

Pseudohongiella nitratireducens is a Gram-negative, aerobic, rod-shaped and motile bacterium from the genus of Pseudohongiella which has been isolated from seawater from the South China Sea.
