= Saccharophagus =

Scientific classification
- Domain: Bacteria
- Kingdom: Pseudomonadati
- Phylum: Pseudomonadota
- Class: Gammaproteobacteria
- Order: Cellvibrionales
- Family: Cellvibrionaceae
- Genus: Saccharophagus; Ekborg et al. 2005
- Species: S. degradans

Binomial name
- Saccharophagus degradans Ekborg et al. 2005

Species of bacterium

Saccharophagus degradans is a gram-negative marine bacterium known to degrade a number of complex polysaccharides as energy source. S. degradans have also been shown to ferment xylose to ethanol. In recent studies, Saccharophagus degradans from the Chesapeake Bay was effectively used to produce cellulosic ethanol. Cellulosic ethanol production by means of bacterial action could be the key cheap production of cellulosic ethanol for global mass market production of bioethanol. It is currently produced by such means as gasification. Saccharophagus degradans is the only species in the genus Saccharophagus.
