= Pseudohongiella acticola =

Scientific classification
- Domain: Bacteria
- Kingdom: Pseudomonadati
- Phylum: Pseudomonadota
- Class: Gammaproteobacteria
- Genus: Pseudohongiella
- Species: P. acticola

Binomial name
- Pseudohongiella acticola Park et al. 2015

Type strain
- CECT 8627, KCTC 42131, GBSW-5

Synonyms
- Nonhongiella acticola

Bacterium from the genus of Pseudohongiella

Pseudohongiella acticola is a Gram-negative, aerobic, rod-shaped, non-spore-forming and motile bacterium from the genus of Pseudohongiella which has been isolated from seawater from the Sea of Japan in Korea.
