= Litorivivens aequoris =

Scientific classification
- Domain: Bacteria
- Kingdom: Pseudomonadati
- Phylum: Pseudomonadota
- Class: Gammaproteobacteria
- Order: incertae sedis
- Family: incertae sedis
- Genus: Litorivivens
- Species: L. aequoris

Binomial name
- Litorivivens aequoris Jun and Yoon 2017

Type strain
- KCCM 90262, NBRC 111904, strain KMU-37

Species of bacterium

Litorivivens aequoriss is a Gram-negative, strictly aerobic, chemoheterotrophic and motile bacterium from the genus Litorivivens which has been isolated from seawater from the beach of Najeong in Korea.
