= Plasticicumulans lactativorans =

Scientific classification
- Domain: Bacteria
- Phylum: Pseudomonadota
- Class: Gammaproteobacteria
- Order: incertae sedis
- Family: incertae sedis
- Genus: Plasticicumulans
- Species: P. lactativorans

Binomial name
- Plasticicumulans lactativorans Jiang et al. 2014

Type strain
- DSM 25287, NCCB 100398, YD

Species of bacterium

Plasticicumulans lactativorans is a polyhydroxybutyrate-accumulating bacterium in the genus Plasticicumulans, which has been isolated from a sewage treatment plant in Kralingseveer, Netherlands.
