= Pseudohongiella spirulinae =

Scientific classification
- Domain: Bacteria
- Kingdom: Pseudomonadati
- Phylum: Pseudomonadota
- Class: Gammaproteobacteria
- Genus: Pseudohongiella
- Species: P. spirulinae

Binomial name
- Pseudohongiella spirulinae Wang et al. 2015

Type strain
- KCTC 32221, LMG 27470

Synonyms
- Nonhongiella spirulinensis

Species of bacterium

Pseudohongiella spirulinae is a Gram-negative, aerobic and motile bacterium from the genus of Pseudohongiella which has been isolated from a pond which was cultivated with Spirulina platensis from Sanya in China.
