= Legionella fallonii =

Scientific classification
- Domain: Bacteria
- Kingdom: Pseudomonadati
- Phylum: Pseudomonadota
- Class: Gammaproteobacteria
- Order: Legionellales
- Family: Legionellaceae
- Genus: Legionella
- Species: L. fallonii

Binomial name
- Legionella fallonii Adeleke et al. 2001

Type strain
- ATCC 700992, CCUG 43887, CIP 107645, DSM 19889, LLAP-10

Species of bacterium

Legionella fallonii is a Gram-negative, catalase-positive, weakly oxidase-positive bacterium from the genus Legionella which was isolated from a ship air-conditioning system.
