= Litorivivens lipolytica =

Scientific classification
- Domain: Bacteria
- Kingdom: Pseudomonadati
- Phylum: Pseudomonadota
- Class: Gammaproteobacteria
- Order: incertae sedis
- Family: incertae sedis
- Genus: Litorivivens
- Species: L. lipolytica

Binomial name
- Litorivivens lipolytica Park et al. 2015

Type strain
- CECT 8654, HJTF-7, KCTC 42157

Synonyms
- Litorivita lipolytica

Species of bacterium

Litorivivens lipolytica is a Gram-negative, aerobic and lipolytic bacterium from the genus Litorivivens which has been isolated from tidal flat sediments from the South Sea in Korea.
