= Pseudohongiella =

Scientific classification
- Domain: Bacteria
- Kingdom: Pseudomonadati
- Phylum: Pseudomonadota
- Class: Gammaproteobacteria
- Order: Pseudomonadales
- Family: Pseudohongiellaceae
- Genus: Pseudohongiella; Wang et al. 2015

Type species
- Pseudohongiella spirulinae Wang et al. 2015

Species
- P. acticola P. nitratireducens P. spirulinae

Synonyms
- Nonhongiella

Genus of bacteria

Pseudohongiella is a genus of bacteria.
