= Litorivivens =

Scientific classification
- Domain: Bacteria
- Kingdom: Pseudomonadati
- Phylum: Pseudomonadota
- Class: Gammaproteobacteria
- Order: incertae sedis
- Family: incertae sedis
- Genus: Litorivivens; Park et al. 2015

Type species
- Litorivivens lipolytica Park et al. 2015

Species
- Litorivivens aequoris Litorivivens lipolytica

Genus of bacteria

Litorivivens is a genus of bacteria from the class Gammaproteobacteria.
