= Orbaceae =

Scientific classification
- Domain: Bacteria
- Kingdom: Pseudomonadati
- Phylum: Pseudomonadota
- Class: Gammaproteobacteria
- Order: Orbales; Kwong and Moran 2013
- Family: Orbaceae; Kwong and Moran 2013

Type genus
- Orbus Volkmann et al. 2010

Genera
- Frischella; Gilliamella; Orbus; Utexia; Zophobihabitans

Family of bacteria

The Orbales are an order of Pseudomonadota with the single family Orbaceae. This order was created to accommodate novel bacterial species isolated from the guts of honeybees and bumblebees.
