= Plasticicumulans =

Scientific classification
- Domain: Bacteria
- Phylum: Pseudomonadota
- Class: Gammaproteobacteria
- Order: incertae sedis
- Family: incertae sedis
- Genus: Plasticicumulans Jiang et al. 2011

Type species
- Plasticicumulans acidivorans Jiang et al. 2011

Species
- Plasticicumulans acidivorans Plasticicumulans lactativorans

Genus of bacteria

Plasticicumulans is a genus of bacteria from the family Candidatus Competibacteraceae.
