= Arsukibacterium =

Scientific classification
- Domain: Bacteria
- Kingdom: Pseudomonadati
- Phylum: Pseudomonadota
- Class: Gammaproteobacteria
- Order: incertae sedis
- Family: incertae sedis
- Genus: Arsukibacterium; Schmidt et al. 2016

Type species
- Arsukibacterium ikkense Schmidt et al. 2016

Species
- Arsukibacterium ikkense; Arsukibacterium indicum; Arsukibacterium perlucidum; Arsukibacterium tuosuense

Genus of bacteria

Arsukibacterium is a Gram-negative, aerobic and motile genus of bacteria from the class Gammaproteobacteria.
