= Bronchial brushing =

Bronchial brushing is a procedure in which cells are taken from the inside of the airway mucosa or bronchial lesions through catheter-based brushing under direct visualization or fluoroscopic guidance. Flexible brushes are passed through the bronchoscope, and the bronchial surface is gently abraded to obtain the specimen. Various types of bronchial brush may be used to collect both cellular and microbiological material, using direct vision when collecting from proximal areas of suspicion or fluoroscopic screening when sampling more peripheral sites. A bronchial brushing is used to find cancer and changes in cells that may lead to cancer. It can also be used to obtain specimens for microbiologic diagnosis.
