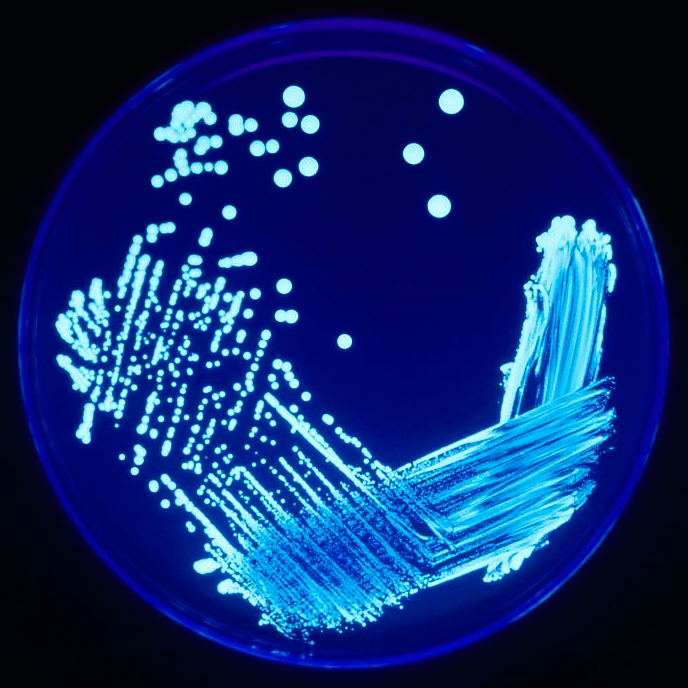
- Legionella sp. under UV light

Scientific classification
- Domain: Bacteria
- Kingdom: Pseudomonadati
- Phylum: Pseudomonadota
- Class: Gammaproteobacteria
- Order: Legionellales
- Family: Legionellaceae; Brenner et al. 1979
- Genus: Legionella; Brenner et al. 1979

Species
- Legionella adelaidensis; Legionella anisa; Legionella beliardensis; Legionella birminghamensis; Legionella bozemanae; Legionella brunensis; Legionella busanensis; Legionella cardiaca; Legionella cherrii; Legionella cincinnatiensis; Legionella clemsonensis; Legionella donaldsonii; Legionella drancourtii; Legionella dresdenensis; Legionella drozanskii; Legionella dumoffii; Legionella erythra; Legionella fairfieldensis; Legionella fallonii; Legionella feeleii; Legionella geestiana; Legionella gormanii; Legionella gratiana; Legionella gresilensis; Legionella hackeliae; Legionella impletisoli; Legionella israelensis; Legionella jamestowniensis; Candidatus Legionella jeonii; Legionella jordanis; Legionella lansingensis; Legionella londiniensis; Legionella longbeachae; Legionella lytica; Legionella maceachernii; Legionella maioricensis; Legionella massiliensis; Legionella micdadei; Legionella monrovica; Legionella moravica; Legionella nagasakiensis; Legionella nautarum; Legionella norrlandica; Legionella oakridgensis; Legionella parisiensis; Legionella pittsburghensis; Legionella pneumophila; Legionella quateirensis; Legionella quinlivanii; Legionella rowbothamii; Legionella rubrilucens; Legionella sainthelensi; Legionella santicrucis; Legionella shakespearei; Legionella spiritensis; Legionella steelei; Legionella steigerwaltii; Legionella saoudiensis; Legionella taurinensis; Legionella thermalis; Legionella tucsonensis; Legionella tunisiensis; Legionella wadsworthii; Legionella waltersii; Legionella worsleiensis; Legionella yabuuchiae; Legionella bononiensis

= Legionella =

Pathogenic genus of Gram-negative bacteria

Legionella is a genus of Gram-negative bacteria that can be seen using a silver stain or grown in a special media that contains cysteine, an amino acid. Most Legionella species are intracellular pathogens whose primary hosts are amoebae, however many Legionella are accidental pathogens of humans. Legionella bacteria are known to cause legionellosis (all illnesses caused by Legionella) including a pneumonia-type illness called Legionnaires' disease and a mild flu-like illness called Pontiac fever. These bacteria are common in many places, like soil and water. Legionella are aerobic and motile. There are over 50 species and 70 types (serogroups) identified. Legionella does not spread from person-to-person. Most individuals who are exposed to the bacteria do not get sick. Most outbreaks result from poorly maintained cooling towers.

The cell wall of the Legionella bacteria has parts that determine its specific type. The structural arrangement and building blocks (sugars) in the cell wall help classify the bacteria.

== Etymology ==
Legionella was named after a 1976 outbreak of a then-unknown "mystery disease" at a convention of the American Legion, an association of U.S. military veterans, in Philadelphia. This outbreak happened within days of the 200th anniversary of the signing of the Declaration of Independence, which led to it being highly publicized and caused great concern in the U.S. On January 18, 1977, the causative agent was identified as a previously unknown bacterium subsequently named Legionella.

== Detection ==
The detection of Legionella typically requires growing them on buffered charcoal yeast extract agar. As Legionella growth requires cysteine and iron, it cannot grow on other common lab media.

To detect Legionella in water, it is first concentrated, then inoculated into charcoal yeast extract agar containing selective agents that prevent the growth of other organisms. Heat or acid treatments are sometimes used to eliminate other microbes in a sample.

After incubation for up to ten days, the presence of Legionella can be confirmed if colonies grow on agar with cysteine but not on agar without it. Immunological techniques are then commonly used to determine the species and/or serogroups of bacteria present in the sample.

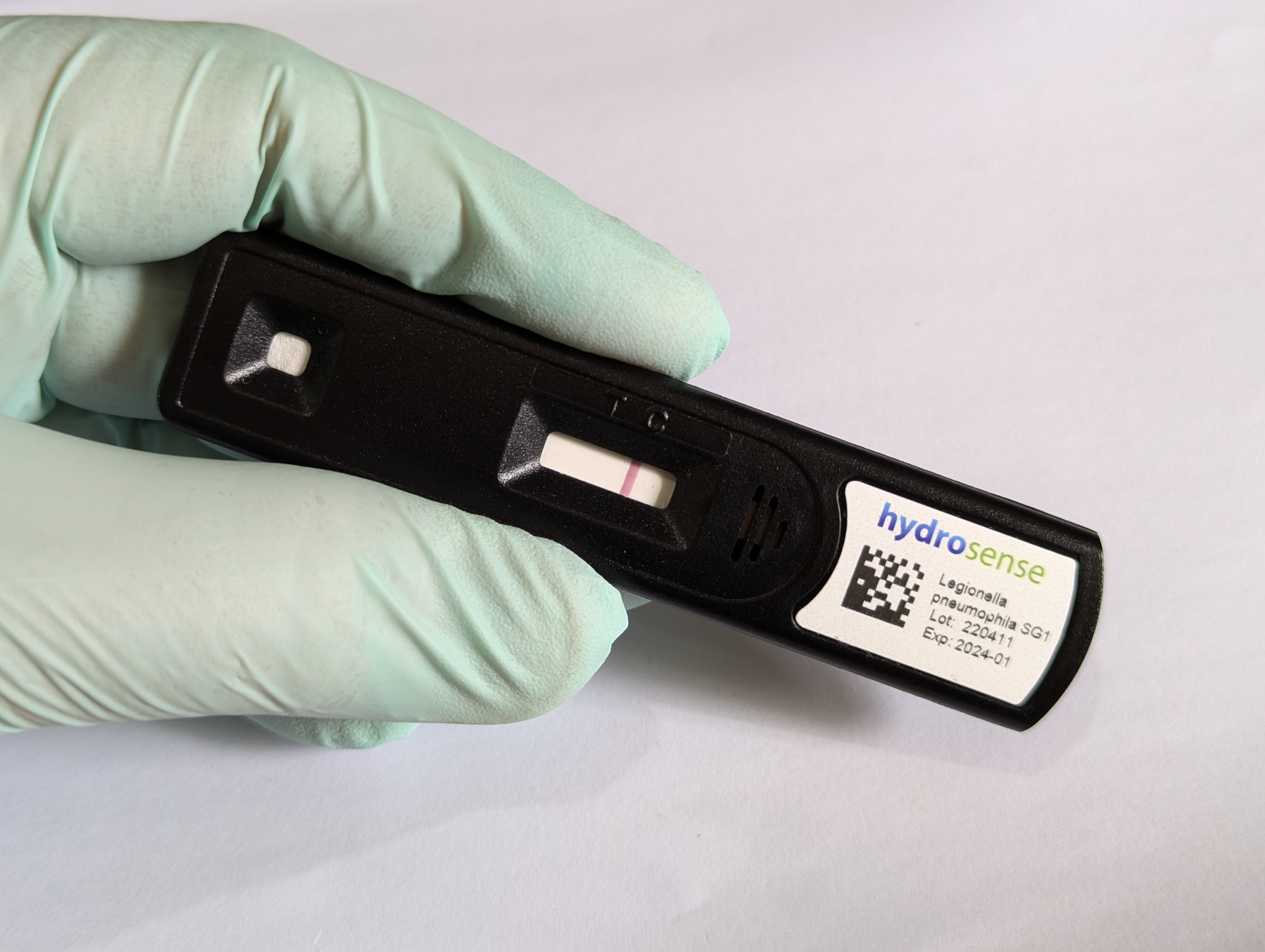
An example of an LFICA test showing a negative result for Serogroup 1

Some hospitals use the Legionella urinary antigen test when Legionella pneumonia is suspected. This test is faster and uses a urine instead of a sputum sample, giving results in hours compared to days. However, it only detects one type of Legionella: Legionella pneumophila serogroup 1 (LP1). Non-LP1 strains can only be detected through culturing.

Methods like polymerase chain reaction (PCR) and rapid immunological tests can detect Legionella in water much faster.

Government health surveillance reports have shown an increase in the proportion of water-related Legionella outbreaks, particularly in healthcare settings.

Genomic analyses of Legionella has resulted in the identification of 24 conserved signature indels (CSIs) in diverse proteins including 30S ribosomal protein S8, periplasmic serine endoprotease DegP precursor, DNA polymerase I, and ABC transporter permease, that are specifically present in different species of the Legionella. These markers can help distinguish Legionella from other types of bacteria, improving diagnosis.

=== Sources ===
Documented sources include cooling towers, swimming pools, domestic water systems, showers, ice-making machines, refrigerated cabinets, whirlpool spas, hot springs, fountains, dental equipment, soil, automobile windshield washer fluid (especially if filled with water instead of wiper fluid), industrial coolant and waste water treatment plants.

Air-conditioning units that do not use water to cool air cannot be sources of infection.

==== Airborne transmission ====
The bacteria can spread through tiny droplets of water that get into the air. People can breathe in these droplets, which then infect cells in the airways, resulting in illness. This is the most common way Legionella spreads.

==== Recreational exposure ====
Cooling towers are well established as sources of Legionella that may have an effect on community exposure to the bacterium and Legionnaires' disease epidemics. In addition to cooling towers, use of swimming pools, spa pools, and other recreational water bodies has also been shown to increase risk of exposure to Legionella, though this differs by species of Legionella. In a review of disease caused by recreational exposure to Legionella, most exposures occurred in spas or pools used by the public (hotels or recreational centers) or in natural settings (hot springs or thermal water).

Hotels and other tourist destinations have contributed to Legionella exposure. The relative danger at commonly used facilities with heating and cooling water systems depends on several factors, such as the water source, how much Legionella is present (if there is any), if and how the water system is treated, how people are interacting with this water, and other factors that make the water systems so dynamic.

In addition to tourists and other recreators, gardeners may be at increased risk for exposure to Legionella. In some countries (such as Australia), Legionella lives in soil and compost. Warmer temperatures and increased rainfall in some regions of the world due to climate change may impact Legionella in soil, gardeners' seasonal exposure to contaminated soil, and complex water systems used by the public.

==== Exposure related to natural disasters and climate change ====
Not only are Legionella spp. present in artificial water systems and infrastructure, but also these bacteria live in natural bodies of water, such as lakes and rivers. Weather patterns and other environmental factors may increase risk of Legionella outbreaks; a study in Minnesota, USA, using outbreak information from 2011 to 2018 showed precipitation as having the greatest effect of increasing risk of Legionella exposure when taking into account other environmental factors (temperature, relative humidity, land use and age of infected person). Weather patterns heavily relate to the established infrastructure and water sources, especially in urban settings. In the US, most cases of Legionella infection have occurred in the summertime, though they were likely more associated with rainfall and humidity than summer temperatures. Severe rain patterns can increase risk of water source contamination through flooding and unseasonable rains; therefore, natural disasters, especially those associated with climate change, may increase risk of exposure to Legionella.

=== Vaccine research ===
No vaccine is available for legionellosis. Vaccination studies using heat-killed or acetone-killed cells have been carried out in guinea pigs, which were then given Legionella intraperitoneally or by aerosol. Both vaccines were shown to give moderately high levels of protection. Protection was dose-dependent and correlated with antibody levels as measured by enzyme-linked immunosorbent assay (ELISA) to an outer membrane antigen and by indirect immunofluorescence to heat-killed cells.

== Molecular biology ==
Legionella is a genetically diverse species with 32% of genes being strain-specific. The molecular function of some of the proven virulence factors of Legionella have been discovered.

== Legionella disease manifestation ==
=== Signs and symptoms ===
Legionella pneumonia, often called atypical pneumonia, is the most common form of legionellosis. The early symptoms are general, including fever, muscle pain, headache, shortness of breath, and a dry or productive cough. Patients with pneumonia who also have neurological or gastrointestinal symptoms like loss of appetite, nausea, or vomiting may be more likely to have legionellosis. A physical examination may reveal abnormal lungs sounds such as rales or rhonchi, and if consolidation is present, there may be signs like egophony or dullness to percussion. Laboratory tests might show either a high or low white blood cell count, low platelets, elevated liver enzymes (ALT, AST), low sodium levels, and possibly decreased kidney function.

Another form of legionellosis is Pontiac fever, which resembles the flu and includes symptoms like fever, headache, muscle pain, chills, dizziness, nausea, vomiting, and diarrhea. This form is milder than Legionella pneumonia and typically resolves on its own.

In some cases, Legionella can cause infections outside the lungs, including skin and soft tissue infections similar to cellulitis. This is especially a concern if contaminated water comes into contact with surgical wounds. It can also lead to heart infections, such as prosthetic valve endocarditis (without positive blood cultures), myocarditis, and pericarditis. In rare cases, Legionella species have been linked to joint infections (example: septic arthritis) and sinusitis.

=== Pathogenesis ===
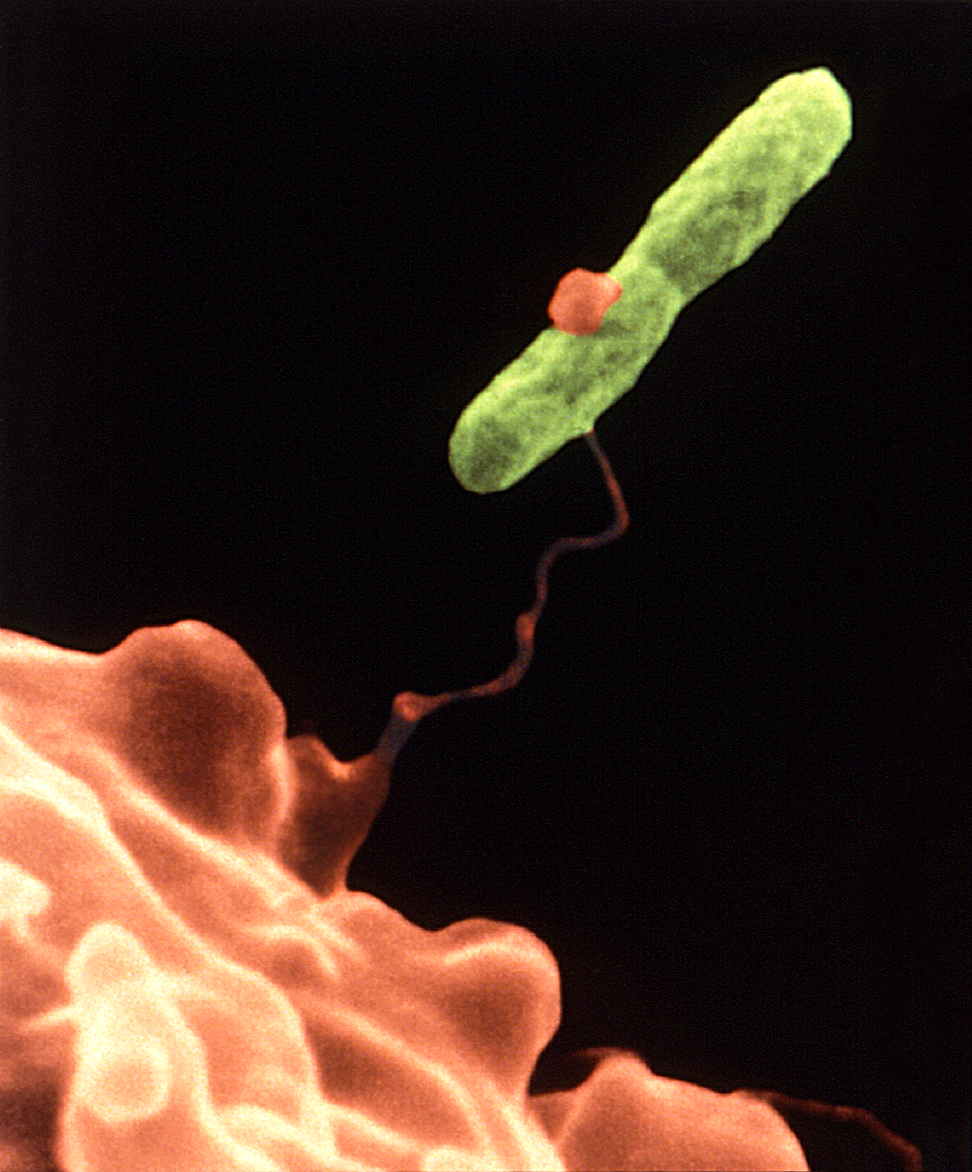
A Legionella pneumophila bacterium (green) caught by a Vermamoeba vermiformis amoeba (orange)

In nature, Legionella bacteria live inside tiny organisms, like amoebae (examples: Acanthamoeba spp., Naegleria spp., Vermamoeba spp., or other protozoa such as Tetrahymena pyriformis). These amoebae are found in water and soil. They are found in low amounts in natural water sources like lakes and streams, but can grow quickly in man-made water systems under the right conditions.

Legionella is spread through inhaling contaminated water droplets, which can come from mists, sprays, or other sources that release tiny droplets into the air. In homes, the most common sources of exposure are shower heads and sinks. The incubation period, or the time it takes for symptoms to appear, is usually two to ten days for Legionella pneumonia and one to three days for Pontiac fever. In rare cases, infection can also happen if people accidentally breathe in drinking water. Person-to-person spread has not been proven, but could be possible in rare situations.

Most healthy people don't get severely sick. The risk of Legionella infection is higher in adults, especially those over 40 years old. People with certain health conditions, like kidney or liver disease, chronic lung disease, or heart disease, are at a greater risk. Those with weakened immune systems, such as cancer patients or organ transplant recipients, are at risk as well. People with chronic illnesses, like autoimmune disease treated with TNF inhibitors, also face a higher risk of infection. Men are about three times more likely than women to get infected, while children are less likely to develop severe cases. Smoking, including cannabis smoking, is strongly linked to increased risk due to damage to the airway lining.

Hospitals and nursing homes are especially concerned about water system safety because vulnerable patients are at a higher risk. For example, the Texas Department of State Health Services, has guidelines for hospitals to stop the spread of Legionella.

In the United States, Legionella infects about 8,000 to 18,000 people each year. Preventing exposure to contaminated water droplets remains key to reducing spread.

=== Mechanism ===
After inhaling or accidentally swallowing small aerosol particles, Legionella bacteria attach to immune cells and are taken up by them through a process called phagocytosis. Inside the body, the bacteria can grow and multiply in lung cells, specifically alveolar macrophages and monocytes.

Legionella has several ways to evade the immune system, increasing the chance that a person develops symptoms of infection. It creates special vacuoles, or protective bubbles, inside immune cells to hide from the body's defenses. It also reduces the activity of cytokine receptors (which play a role in immune response), blocks the production of certain proteins needed by the host, and avoids being broken down by lysosomes, which are cell structures meant to digest harmful particles.

=== Diagnosis ===
Legionella is usually diagnosed using a urinary antigen test. Some patients, especially those in the ICU or those who cannot provide a sputum sample, may need an invasive procedure, such as a bronchoscopy, if the initial urinary antigen test is negative. For the most accurate diagnosis, doctors may take cultures from sputum, fluid from the lungs (called bronchoalveolar lavage), lung tissue, or other affected areas. These cultures are considered the "gold standard" for confirming Legionella infection.

=== Prevention and screening ===
Preventing Legionella infection starts with improving water systems and setting up water-monitoring processes to keep it under control. In the U.S., prevention efforts focus mainly on health care settings, especially hospitals, where water-based exposures are more likely to be fatal. Federal guidelines to reduce Legionella risks were first introduced in June 2017, requiring all medical centers to monitor water quality and have systems in place to prevent hospital-acquired Legionella pneumonia. Facilities with water features, like therapy pools, ice machines, and decorative fountains, must have cleaning and disinfection policies.

To remove Legionella from water systems, chemical disinfectants are often added. Water filtration can also be used, either at the plumbing level or at specific points of use, as a primary or combined prevention method. Using disinfectants requires regular maintenance and monitoring of chemical levels to ensure they're effective in preventing Legionella growth.

=== Treatment ===
Antibiotics are usually the first choice when treating community-acquired pneumonia, which may or may not be caused by Legionella. The first-line options when Legionella is the causative agent are macrolides and fluoroquinolones. Azithromycin, a type of macrolide, is the preferred choice. For patients with mild illness, the treatment course usually lasts about 10–14 days, although most symptoms tend to improve within five days of starting the antibiotics. For patients who are immunosuppressed or have severe cases of Legionella pneumonia, a longer treatment course of three weeks is recommended to ensure effective recovery.

=== Outcomes and prognosis ===
Even with the right treatment, Legionella pneumonia can lead to serious health problems and can be life-threatening. The case fatality rate for this type of pneumonia is about 10%, and patients who are admitted to the ICU or have other major health issues are more likely to die from it. If there is a delay in starting antibiotic treatment, the risk of death can be about three times higher compared to those who receive treatment promptly. Among patients who develop pneumonia in the hospital, especially cases caused by Legionella, the death rate is around 25%. For those who are immunocompromised, the mortality rate can be as high as 30–50%.

After surviving Legionella pneumonia, many patients experience long-term complications, with more than 25% facing ongoing issues such as recurrent hospitalizations, acute kidney failure, lung problems, and recurring pneumonia. On the other hand, recovery from Pontiac fever usually occurs within five days, and serious complications or death related to Pontiac fever are very rare.

=== Epidemiology ===
Legionella is responsible for more than 50% of all waterborne outbreaks and over 10% of diseases related to drinking water in the U.S. The incidence of legionellosis, or Legionella infection, is about two to three cases annually per 100000 people; however, the true number of cases is likely higher than reported. This is because many studies on community-acquired pneumonia do not routinely test for Legionella, meaning some cases may go undetected.

=== History ===
Examples of common-source outbreaks:

- 2001 Spain; source: cooling tower; 449 documented cases of Legionnaires' disease
- 2012: Hotel; source: potable water, fountain, spa; # cases: 89 (+29 suspected)
- 2012: Hospital; source: potable water; # cases: 22
- 2014: Community; source: cooling tower; # cases: 334
- 2014-2015: Hospital/community; source: potable water, household, cooling towers; # case: 86
- 2015: Long-term care facility; source: potable water; # cases: 74
- 2018: Hospital; source: potable water, showers; # cases: 128
- 2019: Hotel; source: fountain; # cases: 13 (+66 suspected)
- 2019: Community; source: hot tub display; # cases: 141

== Legionella control and biomonitoring ==
Control of Legionella growth can occur through chemical, thermal or ultraviolet treatment methods.

=== Heat ===
One option is temperature control – i.e., keeping all cold water below 20 °C (68 °F) and all hot water above 51 °C (124 °F).

Temperature affects the survival of Legionella as follows:

- Above 70 °C (158 °F) – Legionella dies almost instantly
- At 60 °C (140 °F) – 90% die in 2 minutes (Decimal reduction time (D) = 2 minutes)
- At 50 °C (122 °F) – 90% die in 80–124 minutes, depending on strain (D = 80–124 minutes)
- 48 to 50 °C (118 to 122 °F) – can survive but do not multiply
- 32 to 42 °C (90 to 108 °F) – ideal growth range
- 25 to 45 °C (77 to 113 °F) – growth range
- Below 20 °C (68 °F) – can survive, but are dormant

Other temperature sensitivity:

- 60 to 70 °C (140 to 158 °F) to 80 °C (176 °F) – Disinfection range
- 66 °C (151 °F) – Legionella dies within 2 minutes
- 60 °C (140 °F) – Legionella dies within 32 minutes
- 55 °C (131 °F) – Legionella dies within 5 to 6 hours

Water temperature can be monitored in real time with electronic devices.

=== Controlling Legionella in potable water systems ===
Potable water is water that is intended for drinking. The CDC recommends that hot water is kept between 60 °C (140 °F) and 49 °C (120 °F) and that cold water is stored below 20 °C (68 °F). It is also recommended to flush infrequently used fixtures regularly.

=== In building water systems ===
==== Chlorine ====
A very effective chemical treatment is chlorine. For systems with marginal issues, chlorine provides effective results at >0.5 ppm residual in the hot water system. For systems with significant Legionella problems, temporary shock chlorination – where levels are raised to higher than 2 ppm for a period of 24 hours or more and then returned to 0.5 ppm – may be effective. Hyperchlorination can also be used where the water system is taken out of service and the chlorine residual is raised to 50 ppm or higher at all distal points for 24 hours or more. The system is then flushed and returned to 0.5 ppm chlorine prior to being placed back into service. These high levels of chlorine penetrate biofilm, killing both the Legionella bacteria and the host organisms. Annual hyperchlorination can be an effective part of a comprehensive Legionella preventive action plan.

==== Copper–silver ionization ====
Copper–silver ionization is recognized by the U.S. Environmental Protection Agency and WHO for Legionella control and prevention. It is a popular method used in building water systems to control Legionella bacteria, mainly because it is affordable and does not require much maintenance. In this method, the copper ions weaken the bacteria's cell wall, allowing silver ions to then disrupt the bacteria's DNA and proteins, preventing further proliferation. Copper and silver ion concentrations must be maintained at optimal levels, taking into account both water flow and overall water usage, to control Legionella.

Copper–silver ionization is an effective process to control Legionella in potable water distribution systems found in health facilities, hotels, nursing homes, and most large buildings. However, it is not intended for cooling towers because of pH levels greater than 8.6, that cause ionic copper to precipitate. Furthermore, tolyltriazole, a common additive in cooling water treatment, could bind the copper making it ineffective. Ionization became the first such hospital disinfection process to have fulfilled a proposed four-step modality evaluation; by then, it had been adopted by over 100 hospitals. Copper–silver ionization works slower than other disinfectants and is affected by the water's chemical makeup.

==== Chlorine dioxide ====
Chlorine dioxide has been approved by the U.S. Environmental Protection Agency as a primary disinfectant of potable water since 1945. Chlorine dioxide does not produce any carcinogenic byproducts like some other chlorine sources when used in the purification of drinking water that contains natural organic compounds such as humic and fulvic acids; trihalomethanes may be formed. Drinking water containing such molecules has been shown to increase the risk of cancer.

Since chlorine dioxide stays as a gas, it is easier for it to enter microorganisms to disrupt their internal functions. It works better than chlorine when it comes to disrupting biofilms and is effective across a wider pH range. Testing has demonstrated that low levels of chlorine dioxide reduced Legionella bacteria to undetectable levels in six days; however, its effectiveness can be reduced when amoebae are present. It is also not widely distributed in water systems due to concerns regarding its toxicity, unpleasant odors, and harmful byproducts, as stated above, that it can create.

Monochloramine is an alternative. It is created by mixing chlorine and ammonia and valued for its stability and ability to penetrate biofilms better than chlorine. Like chlorine and chlorine dioxide, monochloramine is approved by the U.S. Environmental Protection Agency as a primary potable water disinfectant. Environmental Protection Agency registration requires a biocide label, which lists toxicity and other data required for all registered biocides.

It does work slower than chlorine and requires precise chemical management due to concerns for toxicity.

==== Ultraviolet light ====
Ultraviolet light, in the range of 200 to 300 nm, can inactivate Legionella. According to a review by the US EPA, three-log (99.9%) inactivation can be achieved with a dose of less than 7 mJ/cm^{2}.

==== Biomonitoring ====
A Legionella-specific aptamer has been discovered and in 2022 was developed into an assay for detecting to a limit of 10^{4.3} cells/mL with no processing steps.

== European standards ==
Several European countries established the European Working Group for Legionella Infections to share knowledge and experience about monitoring potential sources of Legionella. The working group has published guidelines about the actions to be taken to limit the number of colony-forming units (that is, live bacteria that are able to multiply) of Legionella per litre:

Legionella bacteria CFU/litre	Action required (35 samples per facility are required, including 20 water and 10 swabs)
1000 or less	System under control
more than 1000 up to 10,000	Review program operation: The count should be confirmed by immediate resampling. If a similar count is found again, a review of the control measures and risk assessment should be carried out to identify any remedial actions.
more than 10,000	Implement corrective action: The system should immediately be resampled. It should then be "shot dosed" with an appropriate biocide, as a precaution. The risk assessment and control measures should be reviewed to identify remedial actions. (150+ CFU/mL in healthcare facilities or nursing homes require immediate action.)

Monitoring guidelines are stated in Approved Code of Practice L8 in the UK. These are not mandatory, but are widely regarded as so. An employer or property owner must follow an Approved Code of Practice, or achieve the same result. Failure to show monitoring records to at least this standard has resulted in several high-profile prosecutions, e.g. Nalco + Bulmers – neither could prove a sufficient scheme to be in place while investigating an outbreak, therefore both were fined about £300,000GBP. Important case law in this area is R v Trustees of the Science Museum 3 All ER 853, (1993) 1 WLR 1171.

Employers and those responsible for premises within the UK are required under Control of Substances Hazardous to Health to undertake an assessment of the risks arising from Legionella. This risk assessment may be very simple for low risk premises, however for larger or higher risk properties may include a narrative of the site, asset register, simplified schematic drawings, recommendations on compliance, and a proposed monitoring scheme.

The L8 Approved Code of Practice recommends that the risk assessment should be reviewed at least every 2 years and whenever a reason exists to suspect it is no longer valid, such as water systems have been amended or modified, or if the use of the water system has changed, or if there is reason to suspect that Legionella control measures are no longer working.

== Weaponization ==
Legionella can be used as a weapon, and indeed genetic modification of L. pneumophila has been shown where the mortality rate in infected animals can be increased to nearly 100%. A former Soviet bioengineer, Sergei Popov, stated in 2000 that his team experimented with genetically enhanced bioweapons, including Legionella. Popov worked as a lead researcher at the Vector Institute from 1976 to 1986, then at Obolensk until 1992, when he defected to the West. He later divulged much of the Soviet biological weapons program and settled in the United States.

== See also ==
- Environmental microbiology
- List of Legionnaires' disease outbreaks
- Microbiomes of the built environment
