= Cellvibrionaceae =

Scientific classification
- Domain: Bacteria
- Kingdom: Pseudomonadati
- Phylum: Pseudomonadota
- Class: Gammaproteobacteria
- Order: Cellvibrionales
- Family: Cellvibrionaceae; Spring et al. 2015

Genera
- Agaribacterium Huang et al. 2017; Agarilytica Ling et al. 2017; Cellvibrio (ex Winogradsky 1929) Blackall et al. 1986; Eionea Urios et al. 2011; Exilibacterium Wang et al. 2020; Gilvimarinus Du et al. 2009; Halioxenophilus Iwaki et al. 2018; Maricurvus Iwaki et al. 2012; Marinimicrobium Lim et al. 2006; Pseudomaricurvus Iwaki et al. 2014; Pseudoteredinibacter Chen et al. 2011; Saccharophagus Ekborg et al. 2005; Simiduia Shieh et al. 2008; Teredinibacter Distel et al. 2002; Thalassocella Lucena et al. 2020; Umboniibacter Romanenko et al. 2010

Family of bacteria

The Cellvibrionaceae are a family of Gammaproteobacteria.
