= Cellvibrionales =

Cellvibrionaceae

Scientific classification
- Domain: Bacteria
- Kingdom: Pseudomonadati
- Phylum: Pseudomonadota
- Class: Gammaproteobacteria
- Order: Cellvibrionales; Spring et al. 2015

Families
- Cellvibrionaceae Spring et al. 2015; Halieaceae Spring et al. 2015; Microbulbiferaceae Spring et al. 2015; Porticoccaceae Spring et al. 2015; Spongiibacteraceae Spring et al. 2015

Order of bacteria

The Cellvibrionales are an order of gram-negative bacteria from the class Gammaproteobacteria.
