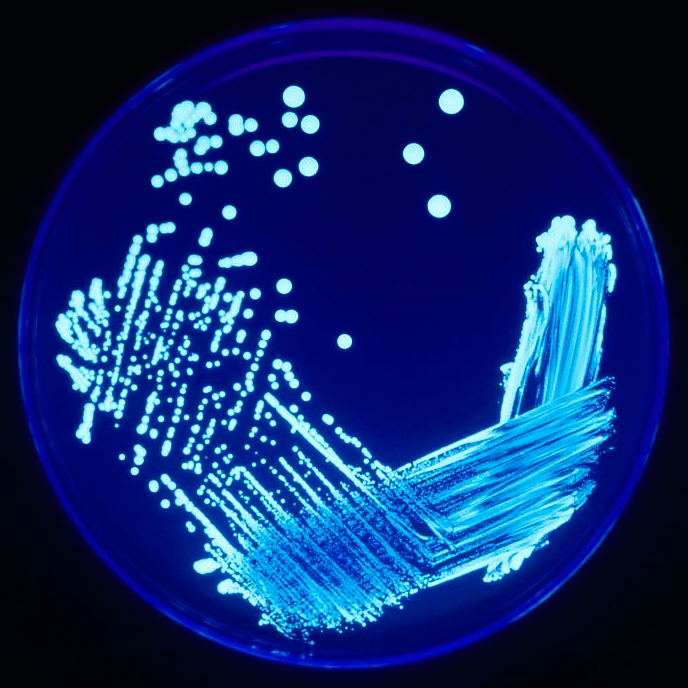
- Legionella sp. under ultraviolet illumination

Scientific classification
- Domain: Bacteria
- Kingdom: Pseudomonadati
- Phylum: Pseudomonadota
- Class: Gammaproteobacteria
- Order: Legionellales

Families and genera
- Legionellaceae; Legionella; Coxiellaceae; Aquicella; Coxiella; Diplorickettsia; Rickettsiella "Ca. Berkiella" "Ca. Fiscibacter" "Ca. Ovatusbacter" "Ca. Pokemonas"

= Legionellales =

Order of bacteria

The Legionellales are an order of Pseudomonadota ("Proteobacteria"). Like all Pseudomonadota, they are Gram-negative. They comprise two families, typified by Legionella and Coxiella, both of which include notable pathogens. For example, Q fever is caused by Coxiella burnetii and Legionella pneumophila causes Legionnaires' disease and Pontiac fever.

Members of the order Legionellales can be molecularly distinguished from other Gammaproteobacteria by the presence of four conserved signature indels (CSIs) in the proteins tRNA-guanine(34) transglycosylase, lipoprotein-releasing system transmembrane protein lolE and tRNA (guanosine(37)-N1)-methyltransferase TrmD.
