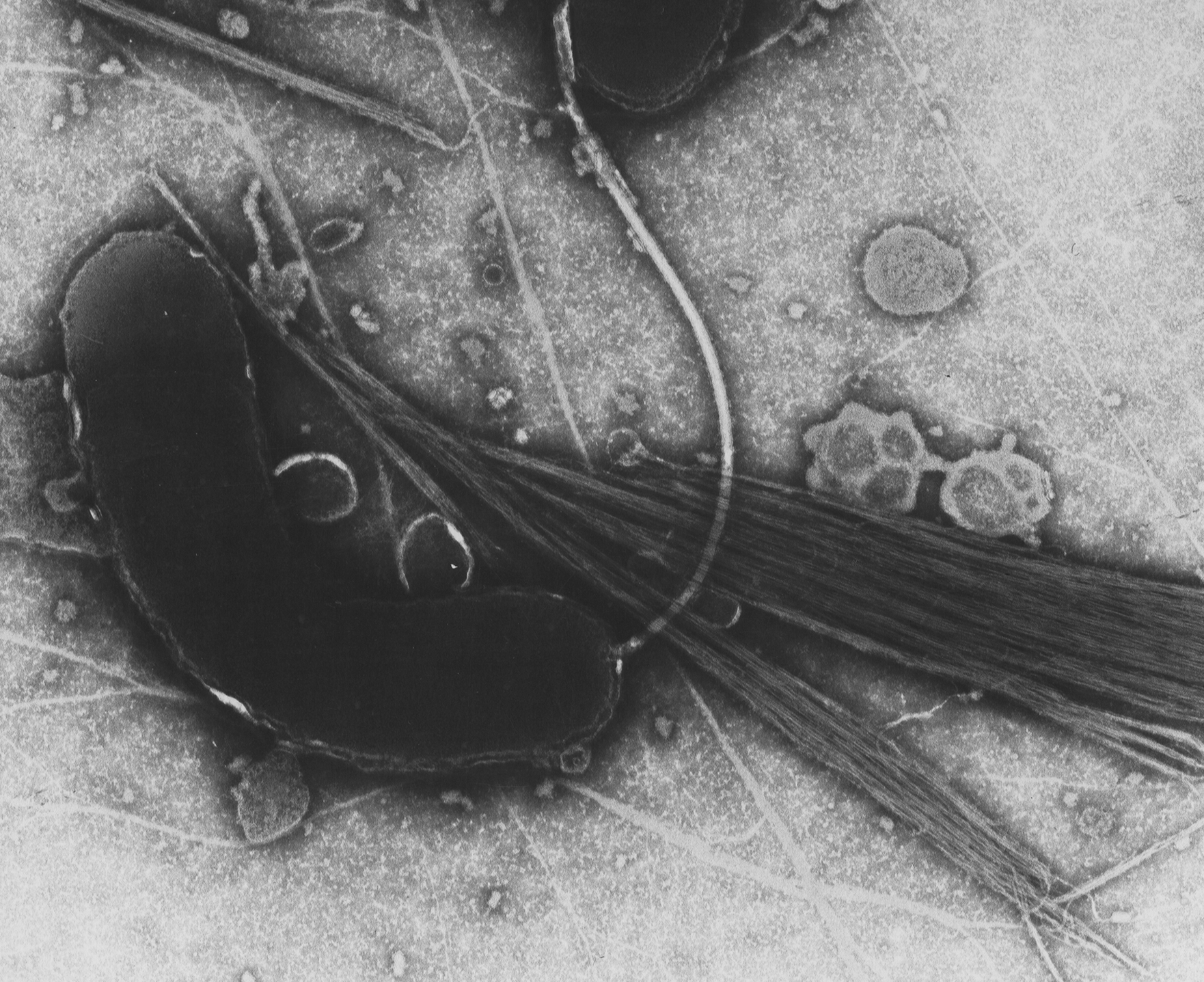
- Vibrio cholerae

Scientific classification
- Domain: Bacteria
- Kingdom: Pseudomonadati
- Phylum: Pseudomonadota
- Class: Gammaproteobacteria; Garrity et al. 2005

Orders
- Acidiferrobacterales Kojima et al. 2015; Aeromonadales Martin-Carnahan and Joseph 2005; Alteromonadales Bowman and McMeekin 2005; Arenicellales Teramoto et al. 2015; Beggiatoales Buchanan 1957; Cardiobacteriales Garrity et al. 2005; Cellvibrionales Spring et al. 2015; Chromatiales Imhoff 2005; Enterobacterales Adeolu et al. 2016; Immundisolibacterales Corteselli et al. 2017; Legionellales Garrity et al. 2005; Methylococcales Bowman 2005; Nevskiales Naushad et al. 2015; Oceanospirillales Garrity et al. 2005; Orbales Kwong and Moran 2013; Pasteurellales Garrity et al. 2005; Pseudomonadales Orla-Jensen 1921 (Approved Lists 1980); Thiohalobacterales Sorokin and Merkel 2023; Thiohalorhabdales Sorokin and Merkel 2023; Vibrionales Garrity and Holt 2001; Xanthomonadales Christensen and Cook 1978 (Approved Lists 1980); Families incertae sedis; Thorselliaceae Kämpfer et al. 2015; Genera incertae sedis; Arsukibacterium Schmidt et al. 2016; "Candidatus Azoamicus" Graf et al. 2021; Litorivivens Park et al. 2015; Plasticicumulans Jiang et al. 2011

Synonyms
- "Chromatiia" Cavalier-Smith 2020

= Gammaproteobacteria =

Class of bacteria in the phylum Pseudomonadota

Gammaproteobacteria is a class of bacteria in the phylum Pseudomonadota (synonym Proteobacteria). It contains about 250 genera, which makes it the most genus-rich taxon of the Prokaryotes. Several medically, ecologically, and scientifically important groups of bacteria belong to this class. All members of this class are Gram-negative. It is the most phylogenetically and physiologically diverse class of the Pseudomonadota.

Members of Gammaproteobacteria live in several terrestrial and marine environments, in which they play various important roles, including in extreme environments such as hydrothermal vents. They can have different shapes, rods, curved rods, cocci, spirilla, and filaments, and include free living bacteria, biofilm formers, commensals and symbionts; some also have the distinctive trait of being bioluminescent. Diverse metabolisms are found in Gammaproteobacteria; there are both aerobic and anaerobic (obligate or facultative) species, chemolithoautotrophics, chemoorganotrophics, photoautotrophs and heterotrophs.

== Etymology ==
The element "gamma" (third letter of the Greek alphabet) indicates that this is Class III in Bergey's Manual of Systematic Bacteriology (Vol. II, page 1). Proteus refers to the Greek sea god who could change his shape. Bacteria (Greek βακτήριον; "rod" "little stick"), in terms of etymological history, refers to Bacillus (rod-shaped bacteria), but in this case is "useful in the interim while the phylogenetic data are being integrated into formal bacterial taxonomy".

== Phylogeny ==
Currently, many different classifications are based on different approaches, such as

- the National Center for Biotechnology Information, based on a combination of Prokaryotic Code and sequence approaches
- List of Prokaryotic names with Standing in Nomenclature, based on the Prokaryotic Code
- ARB-Silva Database based on ribosomal RNA, or
- a multiprotein approach, such as Williams et al. 2010 and Genome Taxonomy Database

It is (as of 2010) still very difficult to resolve the phylogeny of this bacterial class.

The following molecular phylogeny of Gammaproteobacteria is based on a set of 356 protein families.

Phylogeny of Gammaproteobacteria

- Betaproteobacteria
- Gammaproteobacteria
  - Xanthomonadales
  - - Chromatiales
    - Methylococcus
    - Beggiatoa
    - - Legionellales
      - Ruthia, Vesicomyosocius, Thiomicrospira, Dichelobacter, Francisella
      - - - Moraxellaceae, Alcanivorax
          - - Saccharophagus
            - - Oceanospirillaceae
              - - Marinobacter
                - Pseudomonadaceae
        - - Pseudoalteromonadaceae, Alteromonas, Idiomarinaceae
          - - Shewanellaceae
            - - Psychromonadaceae
              - - Aeromonadales
                - - Vibrionales
                  - - Pasteurellales
                    - Enterobacterales

Phylogeny of Gammaproteobacteria after Not all orders are monophyletic, consequently families or genera are shown for the Pseudomonadales, Oceanospirillales, and Alteromonadales. In the case of singleton orders, the genus is shown. (In bacterial taxonomy, orders have the suffix -ales, while families have -aceae.)

A number of genera in Gammaproteobacteria have not yet been assigned to an order or family. These include Alkalimonas, Gallaecimonas, Ignatzschineria, Litorivivens, Marinicella, Plasticicumulans, Pseudohongiella, Sedimenticola, Thiolapillus, and Wohlfahrtiimonas.

== Significance and applications ==
Gammaproteobacteria, especially the orders Alteromonadales and Vibrionales, are fundamental in marine and coastal ecosystems because they are the major groups involved in nutrient cycling. Despite their fame as pathogens, they find application in a huge number of fields, such as bioremediation and biosynthesis.

Gammaproteobacteria can be used as a microbial fuel cell (MFC) element that applies their ability to dissimilate various metals. The produced energy could be collected as one of the most environmentally friendly and sustainable energy production systems. They are also used as biological methane filters.

Phototrophic purple sulfur bacteria are used in wastewater treatment processes. The ability of some Gammaproteobacteria (e.g. the genus Alcanivorax) to bioremediate oil is increasingly important for degrading crude oil after oil spills. Some species from the family Chromatiaceae are notable because they may be involved in the production of vitamin B12. Some Gammaproteobacteria are used to synthesize poly-b-hydroxyalkanoate (PHA), which is a polymer that is used in the production of biodegradable plastics. Many Gammaproteobacteria species are able to generate secondary metabolites with antibacterial properties.

== Ecology ==
Gammaproteobacteria are widely distributed and abundant in various ecosystems such as soil, freshwater lakes and rivers, oceans and salt lakes. For example, they constitute about 6–20% (average of 14%) of bacterioplankton in different oceans, and they are distributed worldwide in both deep-sea and coastal sediments. In seawater, bacterial community composition could be shaped by environmental parameters such as phosphorus availability, total organic carbon, salinity, and pH. In soil, higher pH is correlated with higher relative abundance of Alphaproteobacteria, Betaproteobacteria and Gammaproteobacteria. The relative abundance of Betaproteobacteria and Gammaproteobacteria is also positively correlated to the dissolved organic carbon (DOC) concentration, which is a key environmental parameter shaping bacterial community composition. Gammaproteobacteria are also key players in the dark carbon fixation in coastal sediments, which are the largest carbon sink on Earth, and the majority of these bacteria have not been cultured yet. The deep-sea hydrothermal system is one of the most extreme environments on Earth. Almost all vent-endemic animals are strongly associated with the primary production of the endo- and/or episymbiotic chemoautotrophic microorganisms. Analyses of both the symbiotic and free-living microbial communities in the various deep-sea hydrothermal environments have revealed a predominance in biomass of members of the Gammaproteobacteria.

Gammaproteobacteria have a wide diversity, metabolic versatility, and functional redundancy in the hydrothermal sediments, and they are responsible for the important organic carbon turnover and nitrogen and sulfur cycling processes. Anoxic hydrothermal fluids contain several reduced compounds such as H_{2}, CH_{4}, and reduced metal ions in addition to H_{2}S. Chemoautotrophs that oxidize hydrogen sulfide and reduce oxygen potentially sustain the primary production in these unique ecosystems. In the last decades, it has been found that orders belonging to Gammaproteobacteria, like Pseudomonas, Moraxella, are able to degrade different types of plastics, and these microbes might have a key role in plastic biodegradation.

== Metabolism ==
Gammaproteobacteria are metabolically diverse, employing a variety of electron donors for respiration and biosynthesis.

Some groups are nitrite-oxidizers and ammonia oxidizers like the members of Nitrosococcus (with the exception of Nitrosococcus mobilis) and they are also obligate halophilic bacteria.

Others are chemoautotrophic sulfur-oxidizers, like Thiotrichales, which are found in communities such as filamentous microbial biofilms in the Tor Caldara shallow-water gas vent in the Tyrrhenian Sea. Moreover, thanks to 16S rRNA gene analysis, different sulfide oxidizers in the Gammaporteobacteria class have been detected, and the most important among them are Beggiatoa, Thioploca and Thiomargarita; besides, large amounts of hydrogen sulfide are produced by sulfate-reducing bacteria in organic-rich coastal sediments.

Marine Gammaproteobacteria include aerobic anoxygenic phototrophic bacteria (AAP) that use bacteriochlorophyll to support the electron transport chain. They are believed to be a widespread and essential community in the oceans.

Methanotrophs, such as the order Methylococcales, metabolize methane as sole energy source and are very important in the global carbon cycle. They are found in any site with methane sources, like gas reserves, soils, and wastewater.

Purple sulfur bacteria are anoxygenic phototrophs that oxidize sulfur, but potentially also other substrates like iron. They are represented by members of two families, Chromatiaceae (e.g. Allochromatium, Chromatium, Thiodicyton) and Ectothiorhodospiraceae (e.g. Ectothiorhodospira). A few species within the genus Thermomonas (order Lysobacter) carry out the same metabolism.

Numerous genera are obligate or generalist hydrocarbonclasts. The obligate hydrocarbonoclastic bacteria (OHCB) use hydrocarbons almost exclusively as a carbon source; until now they have been found only in the marine environment. Examples include Alcanivorax, Oleiphilus, Oleispira, Thalassolitus, Cycloclasticus and Neptunomonas, and some species of Polycyclovorans, Algiphilus (order Xanthomonadales), and Porticoccus hydrocarbonoclasticus (order Cellvibrionales) that were isolated from phytoplankton. In contrast, aerobic "generalist" hydrocarbon degraders can use either hydrocarbons or nonhydrocarbon substrates as sources of carbon and energy; examples are found in the genera Acinetobacter, Colwellia, Glaciecola, Halomonas, Marinobacter, Marinomonas, Methylomonas, Pseudoalteromonas, Pseudomonas, Rhodanobacter, Shewanella, Stenotrophomonas, and Vibrio.

The most widespread pathway for carbon fixation among Gammaproteobacteria is the Calvin–Benson–Bassham (CBB) cycle, although a minority may use the rTCA cycle. Thioflavicoccus mobilis (a free living species) and "Candidatus Endoriftia persephone" (symbiont of the giant tubeworm Riftia pachyptila) may use the rTCA cycle in addition to the CBB cycle, and may express these two different pathways simultaneously.

== Symbiosis ==
Symbiosis is a close and a long-term biological interaction between two different biological organisms. A large number of Gammaproteobacteria are able to join in a close endosymbiosis with various species. Evidence for this can be found in a wide variety of ecological niches: on the ground, within plants, or deep on the ocean floor. On the land, it has been reported that Gammaproteobacteria species have been isolated from Robinia pseudoacacia and other plants, while in the deep sea a sulfur-oxidizing gammaproteobacteria was found in a hydrothermal vent chimney; by entering into symbiotic relationships in deep sea areas, sulfur-oxidizing chemolithotrophic microbes receive additional organic hydrocarbons in hydrothermal ecosystems. Some Gammaproteobacteria are symbiotic with geothermic ocean vent-downwelling animals, and in addition, Gammaproteobacteria can have complex relationships with other species that live around thermal springs, for example, with the shrimp Rimicaris exoculata living from hydrothermal vents on the Mid-Atlantic Ridge.

Regarding the endosymbionts, most of them lack many of their family characteristics due to significant genome reduction.

== Pathogens ==
Gammaproteobacteria include several medically and scientifically important groups of bacteria, such as the families Enterobacteriaceae, Vibrionaceae, and Pseudomonadaceae. A number of human pathogens belong to this class, including Yersinia pestis, Vibrio cholerae, Pseudomonas aeruginosa, Escherichia coli, and some species of Salmonella. The class also contains plant pathogens such as Xanthomonas axonopodis pv. citri (citrus canker), Pseudomonas syringae pv. actinidiae (kiwifruit Psa outbreak), and Xylella fastidiosa. In the marine environment, several species from this class can infect different marine organisms, such as species in the genus Vibrio which affect fish, shrimp, corals or oysters, and species of Salmonella which affect grey seals (Halichoerus grypus).

== See also ==
- Betaproteobacteria
- Pseudomonadota
