= List of Legionnaires' disease outbreaks =

This is a list of Legionnaires' disease outbreaks; Legionnaire's is a potentially fatal infectious disease caused by gram negative, aerobic bacteria belonging to the genus Legionella. The first reported outbreak was during a Legionnaires Convention at The Bellevue-Stratford Hotel in Philadelphia in 1976.

An outbreak is defined as two or more cases where the onset of illness is closely linked in time (weeks rather than months) and in space, where there is suspicion of, or evidence of, a common source of infection with or without microbiological support (i.e. common spatial location of cases from travel history).

== Worldwide listings by year ==
=== 1960s ===
Year	City	Venue	Source	Cases	Deaths	Fatality rate	Notes
1965	Washington, D.C., United States	St. Elizabeths Hospital	Unknown	94	16	17%	The outbreak occurred in 1965, but was not identified as legionnaires' disease until saved blood serum was exposed to bacterial samples from the 1976 Philadelphia Legionnaires' disease outbreak.

=== 1970s ===
Year	City	Venue	Source	Cases	Deaths	Fatality rate	Notes
1973, 1977	Benidorm, Spain	Hotel Rio Park	Shower pipes	at least 4	4	unknown	The first outbreak in Hotel Rio Park occurred in 1973, four tourists died, but at the time it was not recognized as Legionnaires' disease until a subsequent outbreak in the same hotel in 1977.
1976	Philadelphia, Pennsylvania, United States	1976 Philadelphia Legionnaires' disease outbreak	Air conditioning	221	34	15.4%	This was the first recognized outbreak of legionellosis, although earlier cases of legionellosis were later discovered to have occurred as far back as 1947. The Philadelphia outbreak, however, had the highest death rate.
1978	Memphis, Tennessee, United States	Baptist Memorial Hospital-Memphis (1912–2000)	air-conditioning cooling tower	44			1978 Memphis Legionnaire's Disease Outbreak
1979	Melbourne, Australia	light industrial building	medium-sized evaporative condenser				
1979	Ballarat, Australia	psychiatric hospital	shower water system				

=== 1980s ===
Year	City	Venue	Source	Cases	Deaths	Fatality rate	Notes
1985	Wollongong, Australia	social club building	small cooling tower				
1985	Stafford, England	Stafford District Hospital	Air conditioning	175	28	16%	In April 1985, 175 patients were admitted to the District or Kingsmead Stafford Hospitals with chest infection or pneumonia. A total of 28 people died. Medical diagnosis showed that Legionnaires' disease was responsible and the immediate epidemiological investigation traced the source of the infection to the air-conditioning cooling tower on the roof of Stafford District Hospital.
1986	Adelaide, Australia	community	small cooling tower at hospital				
1987	Wollongong, Australia	shopping centre	small cooling tower at a shop				
1988	Adelaide, Australia	community	potting mixes				
1988	Westminster, England	BBC headquarters	cooling tower at Broadcasting House				
1989	Sydney, Australia	bowling club	small cooling tower				
1989	Burnie, Australia	community	small cooling tower at hospital				

=== 1990s ===
Year	City	Venue	Source	Cases	Deaths	Fatality rate	Notes
1992	Sydney, Australia	shopping centre	small cooling tower				
1994	Sunshine Coast, Australia	holiday apartment unit	private spa pool				
1995	Sydney, Australia	shopping centre	small cooling tower at hospital				
1996	Christiansburg, Virginia, United States	Department Store	Hot tub	23	2	8.7%	
1999	Bovenkarspel, Netherlands	1999 Bovenkarspel legionellosis outbreak	Hot tub	318	32	10%	In February and March 1999, an outbreak occurred in the Netherlands during the Westfriese Flora flower exhibition in Bovenkarspel, North Holland. 318 people became ill and at least 32 people died. There is a possibility that more people died from it (which might make it the deadliest recorded outbreak), but these people were interred before the Legionella infection was recognized. The source of the bacteria was a hot tub in the exhibition area.

=== 2000s ===
Year	City	Venue	Source	Cases	Deaths	Fatality rate	Notes
2000	Melbourne, Australia	Sea Life Melbourne Aquarium	Cooling tower	125	4	3.2%	In April 2000, an outbreak of Legionella pnemophila serogroup 1 occurred in Melbourne, Australia. The outbreak resulted in 125 confirmed cases of Legionnaire's disease, with 95 (76%) hospitalised. It is reported that 4 died from the outbreak. The investigation traced the source of the infection to the cooling tower at the newly opened aquarium. Since this outbreak, legionella infection statistics are required to be reported by the state government as a notifiable disease. Regulations were introduced by the state to control legionella in 2001.
2000	Vizela, Portugal	Public square	Decorative fountain	11	0	0%	In August 2000, an outbreak of Legionnaires' disease occurred in Vizela, Northern Portugal. A total of 11 persons with Legionnaires' disease were admitted to the hospital. There were no fatalities. All patients had been in the main square of Vizela in the night of August 11–12, 2000, where the annual festivities of the municipality were being held. Investigators traced the source of the outbreak to a decorative fountain located in the square.
2001	Murcia, Spain	Hospital	Cooling towers	800+	6	0.8%	The world's largest outbreak of Legionnaires' disease happened in July 2001 with patients appearing at the hospital on July 7, in Murcia, Spain. More than 800 suspected cases were recorded by the time the last case was treated on July 22; 636–696 of these cases were estimated and 449 confirmed (so, at least 16,000 people were exposed to the bacterium) and 6 died. A case-fatality rate of approximately 1%.
2002	Barrow-in-Furness, England	2002 Barrow-in-Furness legionellosis outbreak	Air conditioning	172	7	4.1%	In 2002, Barrow-in-Furness in England had an outbreak of Legionnaires' disease. Six women and one man died as a result of the illness; another 172 people also contracted the disease. The cause was found to be a contaminated cooling tower at the town's Forum 28 arts centre. Barrow Borough Council later became the first public body in the UK to be charged with corporate manslaughter but were cleared. They were, however, along with architect Gillian Beckingham, fined for breaches of Health and Safety regulations in a trial that ended in 2006.
2003-2004	Pas-de-Calais, France	Petrochemical plant	Cooling tower	86	18	20.93%	This was the worst outbreak of Legionnaires in French history.
2004	Zaragoza, Spain	Hospital	Cooling tower	27	7	26%	Five out of seven of the fatalities were above the age of 50.
2005	Toronto, Canada	Seven Oaks Home for the Aged	Cooling tower	127	21	16.5%	In late September, 2005, 127 residents of a nursing home became ill with Legionella pneumophila. Within a week, 21 of the residents had died. Culture results at first were negative. The source of the outbreak was traced to the air-conditioning cooling towers on the nursing home's roof.
2005	Fredrikstad, Norway	Factory	Air scrubber	103	10	9.7%	At least 103 people became ill and ten died from Legionnaires' disease caused by bacteria growing in an air scrubber of a nearby factory.
2007	Jastrzębie Zdrój, Poland	2nd District Specialist Hospital, Ophthalmic Ward	Water system	4	3	75%	In January 2007 in the 2nd district specialist hospital in Jastrzębie-Zdrój two patients on the ophthalmic ward unexpectedly died. It was noted that they suddenly had a high fever, coughs and hallucinations. First they were transferred to the infectious diseases ward for some hours with a suspicion of pneumonia, later they were transferred to intensive care. Tests showed that both patients had legionellosis. The disease proved to be the cause of death of one of the patients, the other also had circulatory failure. The bacteria responsible for legionellosis was found in four patients from this hospital. In total the outbreak resulted in three deaths.
2008	New Brunswick, New Jersey, United States	Saint Peter's University Hospital	Drinking water	6	2	33.3%	Chlorination in the water system had dropped below effective levels.

=== 2010s ===
Year	City	Venue	Source	Cases	Deaths	Fatality rate	Notes
2010	Wales	South Wales Valleys	Likely cooling towers	22	2	9%	Thought to be cooling towers in local industry.
2011	Dayton, Ohio, United States	Dayton	Hospital air conditioning	11	5	45%	Was the largest outbreak in Ohio since 1994 at the time.
2012	Québec City, Canada	Lower Québec City	Possibly cooling towers	180	13	7.22%	180 confirmed cases as of September 14, 2012, probably due to contaminated water in industrial cooling towers.
2012	Calp, Spain	AR Diamante Beach Hotel	Plumbing system	18	3	17%	Large hotel with solar water heating system for spa and domestic hot water. A month before the deaths, local government authorities may have known about the problem, but were accused of not alerting the public to avoid disruption of the tourism industry.
2012	Edinburgh, Scotland	South west of Edinburgh	Possibly cooling towers	92	4	3%	56 confirmed cases, with a further 36 suspected cases, bringing the total number of people affected to 92. Four people are known to have died from the outbreak.
2012	Chicago, Illinois, United States	JW Marriott Hotel	Decorative Lobby Fountain	10	3	30%	8 confirmed cases with people who stayed at the JW Marriott Chicago during July–August 2012.
2012	Auckland, New Zealand	Unknown	Water Source and/or Air Conditioning	11	1	9%	The number of people affected in a major outbreak of Legionnaires' disease in Auckland, which has claimed one life, has risen to 11.
2012	Stoke-on-Trent, England	Warehouse, Fenton	Hot tub	19	1	5.2%	Infection began in warehouse hot tub. Seventeen of the confirmed cases visited the warehouse a couple of weeks before becoming ill.
2012	Pittsburgh, Pennsylvania, United States	Veteran's Administration Hospital	unknown	22	6	27%	2012 Pittsburgh legionellosis outbreak
2013	Warstein, Germany	Multiple locations	Cooling tower at a plant	165	3	1.8%	Largest legionellosis outbreak in German history. Legionella were also found at a sewage treatment plant and the Warsteiner brewery.
2014	Portugal	2014 Legionella outbreak in Portugal	Cooling tower	375	12	3.2%	A widespread outbreak in Vila Franca de Xira district, Portugal.
2014–2016	Flint, Genesee County, Michigan, United States	Countywide	McLaren Regional Medical Center	87	12	13.8%	Investigation by Frontline also examined cases diagnosed as pneumonia that could have been misdiagnosed and diagnosed as Legionnaires' Disease. McLaren and the Michigan Department of Environmental Quality is being sued for $100 million in regards to the outbreak. See also Flint water crisis, possibly linked to legionnaires disease
2015	Bronx, New York, United States	Co-op City, South Bronx, and Morris Park	Cooling Towers in the Bronx, such as Co-op City, Lincoln Hospital, and Concourse Plaza.	140	13	9.3%	12 people sickened in January 2015. No fatalities reported. The 2015 New York Legionnaires' disease outbreak was investigated the New York City Health Department Out of 17 buildings with cooling towers, five tested positive for the disease, including cooling towers in the Concourse Plaza Hotel and Lincoln Hospital. The Opera House Hotel in the South Bronx is also considered a source of the outbreak. The outbreak is currently being investigated by the New York City Health Department "Environmentalists sampled 35 cooling towers in the Morris Park area, and 15 came back with positive results." In total 52 buildings were sampled and 20 of them came back positive.
2015	Northland, New Zealand	Pahiatua Fonterra Plant	Unknown	3	0	0%	This outbreak occurred at one of Fonterra's milk plants in Northland, New Zealand, in November 2015. Currently three cases have been reported, though currently no deaths.
2015	Quincy, Illinois, United States	Veterans home	Unknown	58	13	27.7%	The outbreak investigation is ongoing
2016	Sydney, Australia	Sydney Town Hall	Suspected cooling tower	at least 4	0	0%	
2016	Hopkins, Minnesota, United States	Citrus Systems, Inc.	Cooling tower	23	1	4.3%	Confirmed by Minnesota Department of Health. 23 people became sick, 17 were hospitalized, and one person died.
2017	Manhattan, New York, United States	Lenox Hill	TBD	7	1	14.3%	
2017	Las Vegas, Nevada, United States	Rio Hotel and Casino	Water system	2	0	0%	
2017	Round Rock, Texas, United States	SpringHill Suites hotel	Swimming pool and hot tub	6	0	0%	
2017	Anaheim, California, United States	Disneyland	Cooling towers	22	1	4.5%	
2017	Lisbon, Portugal	São Francisco Xavier Hospital	Cooling tower	56	6	11%	In November 2017, an outbreak of Legionnaires' disease occurred in São Francisco Xavier Hospital, in Lisbon, Portugal. The outbreak resulted in 56 confirmed cases of Legionnaire's disease, of which 6 died. The investigation traced the source of the infection to a cooling tower in the hospital.
2018	Bloomsbury, London	University College London	Water cooler	1	0	0%	
2018	Washington Heights, New York, United States	The Sugar Hill Project (Building)	Cooling towers	27	1	3.7%	
2019	Westminster, London, England	Dolphin Square	Water System	3	0	0%	First case confirmed by NHS England 20 March 2019. Samples taken from the flexible shower hose and bathroom sink of the affected resident's flat, showed legionella bacteria present in those specific locations. Third case confirmed by Public Health England 1 July 2019.
2019	Evergem, Belgium	Ghent/Evergem Port Stora Enso	Cooling Towers	32	2	6.7%	Five samples collected from 17 initially suspected cooling towers at the Port of Ghent near Evergem, tested positive for Legionella pneumophila, 3 with average and 2 in high quantities. Genetic testing confirmed 1 of 2 towers with high quantities to have links with the patients. Swedish-Finnish Stora Enso admitted to be responsible.
2019	Ohio, New Jersey and Michigan, United States	Multiple locations	Not yet determined Flint MI Water Crisis	32	6	18.75%	As of June 4, 2019, 32 have fallen sick during the outbreaks across the states of New Jersey and Ohio. Many have fallen sick and died from drinking or being near the contaminated water in Flint, MI.
2019	Atlanta, United States	Sheraton downtown		11	0	0%	
2019	Fletcher, North Carolina, United States	North Carolina Mountain State Fair	hot tub display	141	4	2.8%	

=== 2020s ===
Year	City	Venue	Source	Cases	Deaths	Fatality rate	Notes
2020	Vernon Hills, Illinois, United States	Brookdale Senior Living	Under investigation	5	1	20%	Outbreak of Legionnaires' disease up to five reported cases at Vernon Hills senior living center.
2020	Vila do Conde, Póvoa do Varzim, Matosinhos, Porto District, Portugal	Multiple locations	Under investigation	88	15	17%	88 cases and 15 deaths (11 of these were also infected with SARS-CoV-2). The source of the bacteria is still unknown. The deadliest Legionella outbreak in Portugal, it was declared extinct on January 13, 2021.
2022	San Miguel de Tucumán, Tucumán Province, Argentina	Health clinic	Under investigation	22	6	27%	Cluster of pneumonia cases associated with a health clinic. 22 cases and 6 deaths (all with comorbidities). The source of the bacteria is still unknown.
2023	Rzeszów, Subcarpathian Voivodeship, Poland	Multiple locations	Under investigation	164	41	25%	Ongoing outbreak. The source of the bacteria is suspected to be contaminated water sources.
2024	Lincoln, New Hampshire, United States	RiverWalk Resort	Cooling Tower	5	0	0%	Ongoing outbreak. The source of the bacteria is suspected to be contaminated cooling towers.
2025	London, Ontario, Canada	Multiple locations	HVAC system at Sofina Foods Inc.	105	5	4.5%	Declared over on August 6 but was later redeclared ongoing as 25 more cases were reported.
2025	Harlem, New York City, New York, United States	Multiple locations	Cooling towers at Harlem Hospital and NYC Public Health Laboratory	114	7	6%	Outbreak began Aug 9 and declared over Aug 29, 2025. DOH inspectors discovered Legionnaires bacteria in 12 cooling towers at 10 buildings in Harlem. Via matching bacterial strains, outbreak is believed to have originated in cooling towers atop Harlem Hospital and the under-construction NYC Public Health Lab (W137 St).
2025	Marshall County, Iowa, United States	Multiple locations	Cooling towers	74	2	2.7%	There have been 74 cases of legionellosis since the outbreak started in late August with 2 deaths as of September 23. The source of this outbreak is still unclear, although state and local leaders suspect a cooling tower in the community.
2026	Toronto, Canada	Multiple locations	Under investigation	9	0	0%	9 cases of Legionnaires' disease have been identified in Toronto, with cases first identified in late March. The cases are locally clustered, although the cause remains under investigation.

== Governmental controls to prevent outbreaks ==
=== Regulations and ordinances ===
The guidance issued by the UK government's Health and Safety Executive (HSE) now recommends that microbiological monitoring for wet cooling systems, using a dipslide, should be performed weekly. The guidance now also recommends that routine testing for legionella bacteria in wet cooling systems be carried out at least quarterly, and more frequently when a system is being commissioned, or if the bacteria have been identified on a previous occasion. Further non-statutory UK guidance from the Water Regulations Advisory Scheme now exists for pre-heating of water in applications such as solar water heating systems.

The City of Garland, Texas, United States requires yearly testing for legionella bacteria at cooling towers at apartment buildings.

Malta requires twice yearly testing for Legionella bacteria at cooling towers and water fountains. Malta prohibits the installation of new cooling towers and evaporative condensers at health care facilities and schools.

The Texas Department of State Health Services has provided guidelines for hospitals to detect and prevent the spread of nosocomial infection due to legionella. The European Working Group for Legionella Infections (EWGLI) was established in 1986 within the European Union framework to share knowledge and experience about potential sources of Legionella and their control. This group has published guidelines about the actions to be taken to limit the number of colony forming units (i.e., the "aerobic count") of micro-organisms per mL at 30 °C (minimum 48 hours incubation):

Aerobic count	Legionella	Action required
10,000 or less	1,000 or less	System under control.
more than 10,000 up to 100,000	more than 1,000 up to 10,000	Review program operation. The count should be confirmed by immediate re-sampling. If a similar count is found again, a review of the control measures and risk assessment should be carried out to identify any remedial actions.
more than 100,000	more than 10,000	Implement corrective action. The system should immediately be re-sampled. It should then be 'shot dosed' with an appropriate biocide, as a precaution. The risk assessment and control measures should be reviewed to identify remedial actions.

Almost all natural water sources contain Legionella and their presence should not be taken as an indication of a problem. The tabled figures are for total aerobic plate count, cfu/ml at 30 °C (minimum 48 hours incubation) with colony count determined by the pour plate method according to ISO 6222(21) or spread plate method on yeast extract agar. Legionella isolation can be conducted using the method developed by the US Center for Disease Control using buffered charcoal yeast extract agar with antibiotics.

Copper-Silver ionization is an effective industrial control and prevention process to eradicate Legionella in potable water distribution systems and cooling towers found in health facilities, hotels, nursing homes and most large buildings. In 2003, ionization became the first such hospital disinfection process to have fulfilled a proposed four-step modality evaluation; by then it had been adopted by over 100 hospitals. Additional studies indicate ionization is superior to thermal eradication.

A 2011 study by Lin, Stout and Yu found Copper-Silver ionization to be the only Legionella control technology which has been validated through a 4-step scientific approach.

It was previously believed that transmission of the bacterium was restricted to much shorter distances. A team of French scientists reviewed the details of an epidemic of Legionnaires' disease that took place in Pas-de-Calais in northern France in 2003–2004. There were 86 confirmed cases during the outbreak, of whom 18 died. The source of infection was identified as a cooling tower in a petrochemical plant, and an analysis of those affected in the outbreak revealed that some infected people lived as far as 6–7 km from the plant.

A study of Legionnaires' disease cases in May 2005 in Sarpsborg, Norway concluded that: "The high velocity, large drift, and high humidity in the air scrubber may have contributed to the wide spread of Legionella species, probably for >10 km."

In 2010 a study by the UK Health Protection Agency reported that 20% of cases may be caused by infected windscreen washer systems filled with pure water. The finding came after researchers spotted that professional drivers are five times more likely to contract the disease. No cases of infected systems were found whenever a suitable washer fluid was used.

Temperature affects the survival of Legionella as follows:

- 70 to 80 °C (158 to 176 °F): Disinfection range
- At 66 °C (151 °F): Legionellae die within 2 minutes
- At 60 °C (140 °F): They die within 32 minutes
- At 55 °C (131 °F): They die within 5 to 6 hours
- Above 50 °C (122 °F): They can survive but do not multiply
- 35 to 46 °C (95 to 115 °F): Ideal growth range
- 20 to 50 °C (68 to 122 °F): Growth range
- Below 20 °C (68 °F): They can survive but are dormant

Removing slime, which can carry legionellae when airborne, may be an effective control process.

== See also ==
- Pontiac fever
