= 1999 Bovenkarspel legionellosis outbreak =

Outbreak of legionellosis in Bovenkarspel, the Netherlands

Coordinates: 52°42′1.4″N 5°15′5″E

- Part of Westfriese Flora
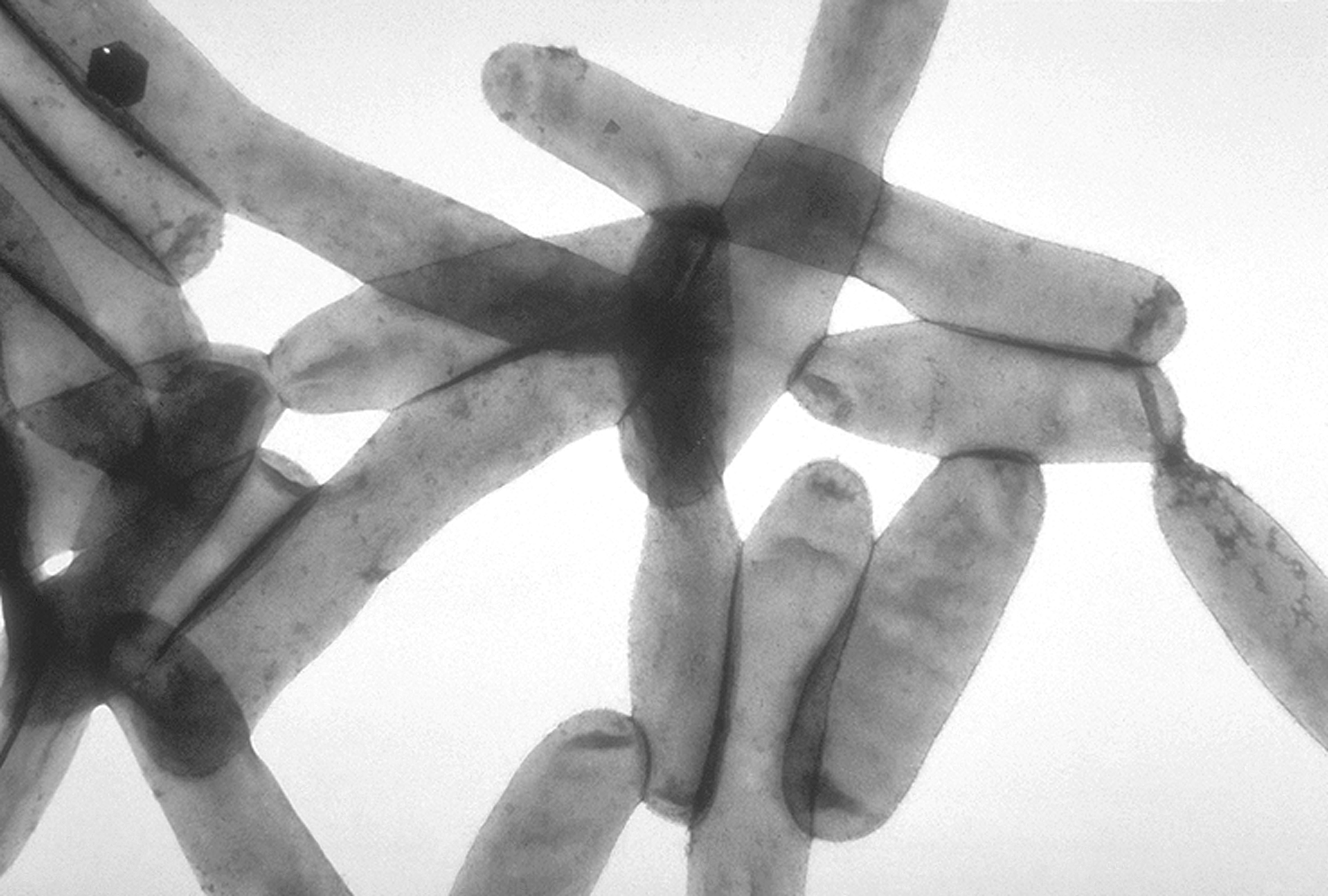
- Legionella pneumophila bacterium
- Native name: Legionellaramp
- Date: 25 February 1999
- Venue: CNB Auction Hall
- Location: Bovenkarspel, Netherlands
- Cause: Hot tub filled with water from long-inactive fire hose
- Deaths: (at least) 32
- Injuries: 206

The Bovenkarspel legionellosis outbreak (Dutch: Legionellaramp; Legionella disaster) began on 25 February 1999 in Bovenkarspel, the Netherlands, and was one of the largest outbreaks of legionellosis in history. With at least 32 dead and 206 severe infections, it was the deadliest legionellosis outbreak since the original 1976 outbreak in Philadelphia, United States.

Between 19 and 28 February 1999, the Westfriese Flora took place in Bovenkarspel, one of the largest indoor flower exhibitions in the world (later the Holland Flowers Festival). A vendor had several recreational hot tubs on display, with one of them filled from a long-inactive fire hose and heated to 37 degrees Celsius (98.6 degrees Fahrenheit). In the water that had previously stagnated inside the hose, a very aggressive type of Legionella pneumophila bacterium had developed. Although the Dutch Health Council had recommended treating whirlpool water with chlorine since 1986, this was not done with the affected hot tub, allowing the bacteria to spread. In 2001, the Regulation on Legionella Prevention in Drinking Water and Warm Tap Water came into effect to prevent further legionellosis outbreaks.

In October 2000, a memorial to the victims of the outbreak was unveiled in Bovenkarspel.
