= Hot tub filter =

A spa filter is a type of filter that works continuously to keep debris and sediments from the water in a spa pool.

== Cartridge filters ==
Cartridge filter technologies were first invented in the mid-1960s. There are three parts to a cartridge filter: end caps (typically made of plastic), a core structure to provide strength (often PVC), and a pleated media (often polyester) with a continuously graded, fixed pore structure. There are more than 500 shapes and sizes of such filter cartridges in use today. Such cartridges can provide pre- and final filtration steps in the same cartridge, resulting in lower overall filtration and disposal costs.

Cartridge filters routinely filter out particulate down to ca. 5-10 micrometres in size. They have large surface areas enabling them to operate for long periods. Cartridge filter systems also permit better water flow that other filter alternatives–thus placing less strain on filter pumps. These types of filters are also easiest to clean, e.g., using the flow of high-pressure water from a hose. Such filters are made of polyester or other materials that can provide a superfine filtering surface. Pleats or folds in such filters are key to their operation: tight pleats allow for a large amount of material to be used in a small container, and the more material used, the larger the surface area available to capture debris. The fabric of the filter catches and holds impurities until the filter can be cleaned or replaced.

In most areas, cartridge filters are less expensive than diatomaceous earth filters, but cost more than sand filters. Cartridge filters are popular because they involve minimal maintenance.In some situations, it may be sufficient to hose off a cartridge filter a few times each season to keep them working properly. In other situations, one may need to soak filters in detergent to clean them, or even replace them. When maintenance is efficiently performed, it can take only a few minutes to return a filtration system to operation.

== Diatomaceous earth filters ==
The fossilised remains of diatoms are mined as diatomaceous earth, which is used to manufacture the white, unscented powder widely used in industrial filtration applications, and available for spa pool filtration cartridges.

== Ceramic filtration ==
Ceramic filters have been used in water treatment for several centuries. Though are being marketed for centralized water treatment systems, most ceramic filters are now being manufactured for point-of-use applications.

Cleaning and maintenance of the filter is critical; so like other low-cost point of use systems, it is best combined with an educational program about safe storage, filter cleaning, and other recommended practices. The advantages of ceramic filters are their ease of use, long life (if not broken), and fairly low cost. Disadvantages include possible recontamination of stored water since there is no chlorine residual and a relatively low flow rate - typically one to two litres per hour.

== Sand filtration ==
Sand filters are one type of filter in use. These filters use sand as the filtering medium. Sand filters look like large balls and they hold hundred of pounds of sterile sand. Water flows into the top of the filter housing and makes its way down through the sand bed where the sharp edges of the sand catch the particulates. Sand filters remove particles as small as 20 to 25 microns. However, sand filters certainly are efficient enough to keep just about any pool clean.

To keep a sand filter working, depending on the size of the filter you must clean it as often as once a week. Maintenance means backwashing where the flow of clean water is reversed back into the filter. The problem with this, however, is that backwashed water is simply wasted. A typical backwashing session can waste a few hundred gallons of water – water that must be replaced.

== Polymer fiber ==
Polymer fiber filters, sometimes arranged into filter balls, are often made of polyethylene terephthalate and are designed to last longer than conventional filters and have a lower environmental impact.

== See also ==
- Hot tub
- History of water filters
