= Gloria (1980 film) =

1980 film by John Cassavetes

- Theatrical release poster
- Directed by: John Cassavetes
- Written by: John Cassavetes
- Produced by: Sam Shaw
- Starring: Gena Rowlands
- Cinematography: Fred Schuler
- Edited by: George C. Villaseñor
- Music by: Bill Conti
- Color process: Technicolor
- Production company: Columbia Pictures
- Distributed by: Columbia Pictures
- Release date: October 1, 1980
- Running time: 122 minutes
- Country: United States
- Language: English
- Budget: $4 million
- Box office: $4.9 million

Gloria is a 1980 American neo-noir crime thriller film written and directed by John Cassavetes. It tells the story of Gloria Swenson, gangster Tony Tanzini's former girlfriend who goes on the run with Phil Dawn, a young boy who is being hunted by the mob for information he may or may not have. It stars Gena Rowlands, Julie Carmen, Buck Henry and John Adames.

The film had its world premiere at the 37th Venice International Film Festival, winning the Golden Lion, the festival's top prize, in a tie with Atlantic City by Louis Malle.

== Plot ==
In New York City, in the South Bronx, Jeri Dawn is heading home with groceries. Inside the lobby of her apartment building, she passes a man whose dress and appearance are out of place. Jeri quickly boards the elevator. She is met in her apartment by her husband Jack, an accountant for a New York City mob family. There is a contract on Jack and his family, as he has been acting as an informant for the FBI. Suddenly, a neighbor, Gloria Swenson, rings their doorbell, asking to borrow some coffee. Jeri tells Gloria there is an impending hit on her family and implores Gloria to protect her children. Gloria doesn't like kids but reluctantly agrees. The Dawns' daughter Joan refuses to leave and locks herself in the bathroom. While Jeri and Jack attempt to get Joan, Gloria takes their young son Phil and an incriminating accounts ledger to her apartment, narrowly missing the hit squad.

After hearing loud shotgun blasts from the Dawns' apartment, a visibly shaken Gloria decides that she and Phil must go into hiding. After quickly packing a bag, they leave the building, just as police are entering with heavy weapons. Meanwhile, a crowd of onlookers and news reporters have gathered in front of the building, and a cameraman captures a picture of them leaving.

Gloria and Phil take a cab into Manhattan, where they hide out in an empty apartment. The following morning, Phil sneaks out of the apartment and sees his photograph on the front page of several newspapers. Later on, Gloria watches the news on television, which reports the mob hit and names her as Phil's suspected abductor.

The next morning, realizing they are not safe where they are, Gloria and Phil sneak out of the apartment just as a group of gangsters close in on them. The gangsters know Gloria and confront her on the sidewalk outside, exhorting her to give up Phil and the ledger. Gloria pulls out a revolver and shoots at the car of five gangsters, which takes off and flips over.

Gloria goes to the bank to empty her safe deposit box, and the two settle for the night at a flophouse. She confronts another group of gangsters at a restaurant; she asks for immunity in exchange for the ledger. One of the goons says that only Tanzini can agree to that so she disarms them and flees.

The next day, Gloria tells Phil that she plans to send him away to a boarding school. Offended by her intentions, Phil claims he is an independent grown man who can manage alone. Gloria decides to abandon him and have a drink. She is soon filled with guilt for leaving Phil and rushes back to look for him; however, he has been captured by some wiseguys. Gloria rescues him, killing one mobster in the process, and fleeing from two others via a taxi and the subway, where several by-standers help her escape.

Gloria and Phil eventually make it to a hotel room in Newark, where she laments the mob's strength and ubiquitous presence, explaining to Phil that she was once the mistress of Tanzini himself. She meets with Tanzini, relinquishes the ledger, and then flees, killing one gangster as another shoots down upon her elevator car. Phil waits several hours, then flees to Pittsburgh via rail. At a cemetery, Phil and Gloria (the latter disguised as the former's grandmother arriving in a limousine after miraculously surviving her ordeal) reunite.

== Cast ==
- Gena Rowlands as Gloria Swenson
- Buck Henry as Jack Dawn
- Julie Carmen as Jeri Dawn
- John Adames as Phil Dawn
- Lupe Garnica as Margarita Vargas
- Jessica Castillo as Joan Dawn
- Tom Noonan as Mobster
- Gary Howard Klar as Irish Cop
- J.C. Quinn as Mobster
- Alex Stevens as Mobster
- Sonny Landham as Mobster
- Ray Baker as Assistant Bank Manager
- John Finnegan as Frank
- Lawrence Tierney as The Bartender
- Val Avery as Sill
- Edward Wilson as Guillermo D'Antoni
- Basilio Franchina as Tony Tanzini

== Production ==
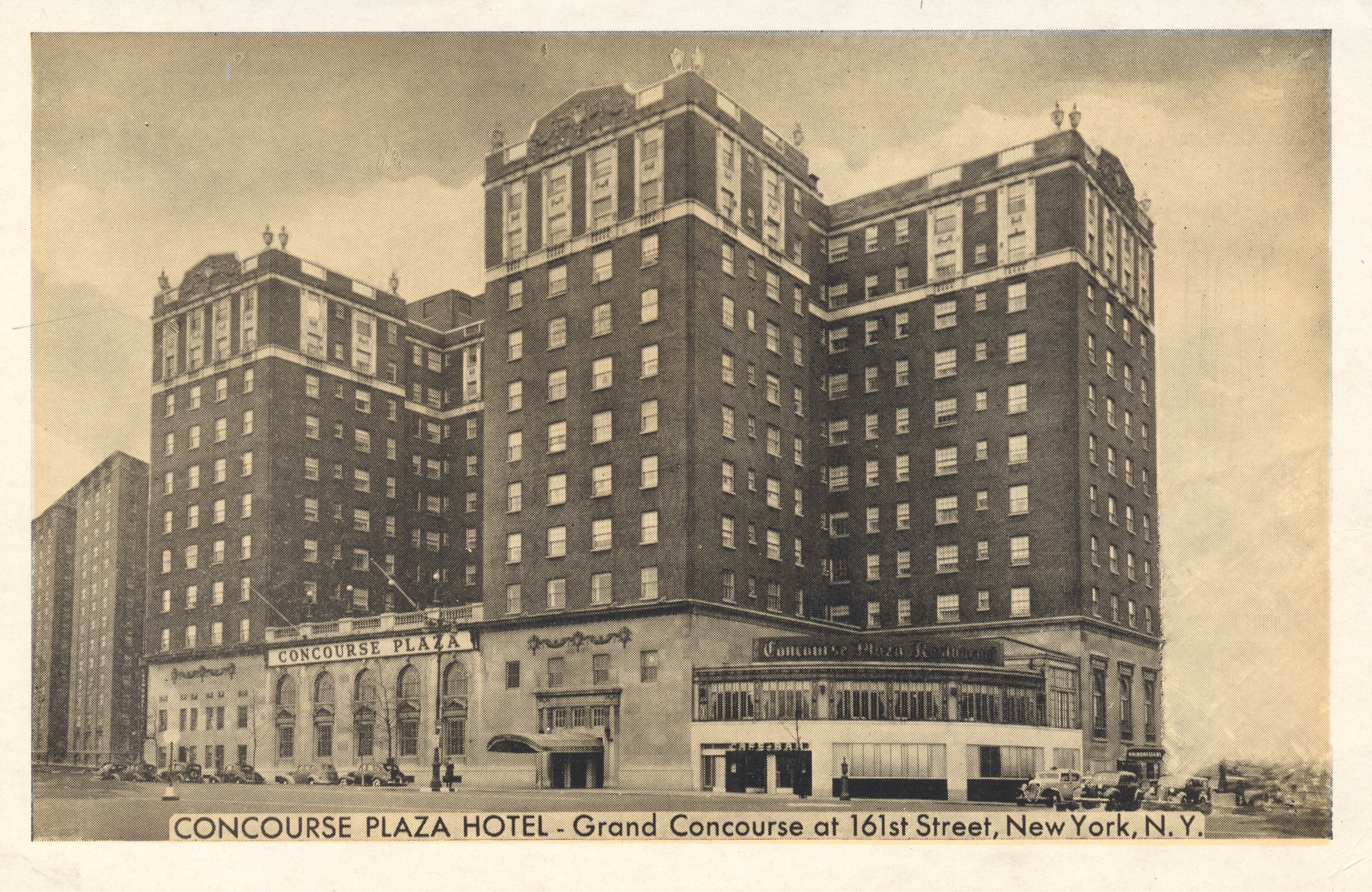
Concourse Plaza Hotel (old postcard)
Bronx apartment

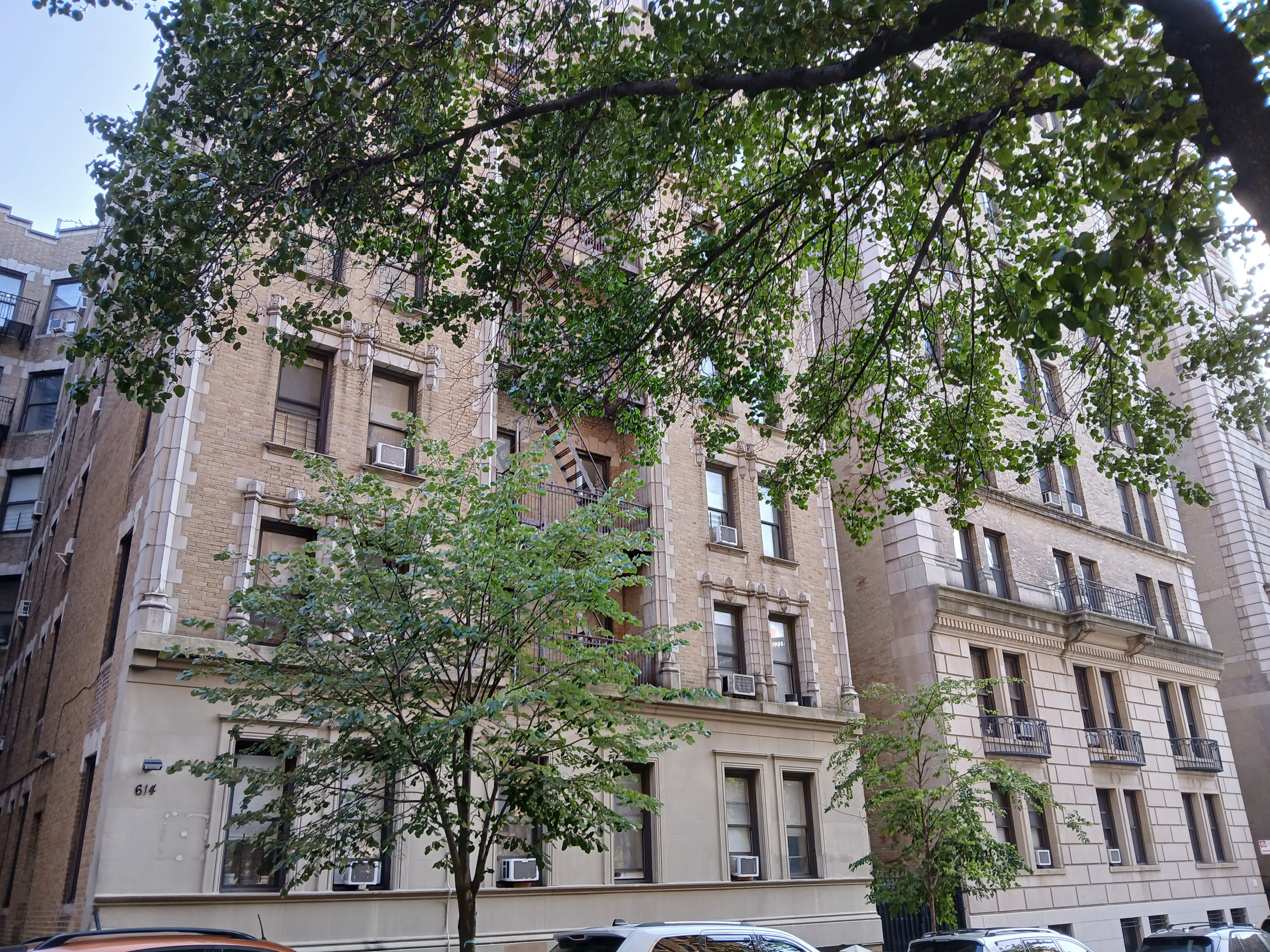
The Grinnell, 800 Riverside Drive
(Other apartments)

Filming locations

John Cassavetes did not originally intend to direct his screenplay and planned merely to sell the story to Columbia Pictures. However, once his wife, Gena Rowlands, was asked to play Gloria Swenson, the title character in the film, she asked Cassavetes to direct it. Gloria is John Adames' only film role.

Cassavetes deliberately selected nonglamorous parts of New York to avoid a "Woody Allen movie" effect. Cassavetes told a biographer "that all the pictures that are made about New York never concentrate on neighborhoods. And New York to me is comprised of a series of neighborhoods."

Three weeks were set aside for rehearsal prior to filming, which began at the former Concourse Plaza Hotel which was the set for the seedy apartment building at the beginning of the film. An apartment building at 800 Riverside Drive was the location for three of other setting: Gloria's sister's place; the Newark hotel room, and Tony Tanzini's headquarters. Cassavetes "had to struggle to keep Rene D'Auriac and the Columbia set-design crew from cleaning them up or retouching the graffiti on the Concourse Plaza."

The boy, played by nonprofessional actor John Adames, was cast after an open call. He was between five and seven years old when cast, and his character Phil Dawn was six.

The role of the boy was described by Cassavetes as "neither sympathetic nor non-sympathetic. He's just a kid. He reminds me of me, constantly in shock, reacting to this unfathomable environment. He was always full of excitement and wonderment as to what he was doing, trying to comprehend this fathomless story of a family being wiped out." His biographer Ray Carney writes: "To add to the toughness of the performance, Gena Rowlands didn't come out of character between takes and was as cool to Adames when they weren't filming as when they were. She felt that if she treated him any differently on the set than her character was in the movie, it would only confuse the boy and potentially spoil their scenes. Cassavetes endorsed her decision."

== Reception ==
On review aggregator Rotten Tomatoes, the film has a 91% approval rating based on 33 reviews, with an average rating of 7.1/10. The website's critics consensus reads: "A comparatively commercial entry from director John Cassavetes, Gloria's pulpy pleasures are elevated by his observant touch and Gena Rowlands' galvanizing star performance." Metacritic, which uses a weighted average, assigned the film a score of 68 out of 100, based on 12 critics, indicating "generally favorable" reviews.

New York Times critic Vincent Canby wrote that the film "has its charms but not for a minute is it believeable." He called it "a very peculiar, lumpy mixture. It's Hollywood-style hokum directed and acted in the bravura manner of all of Mr. Cassavetes's earlier, sometimes quite spectacular home movies." Canby praised Rowlands and called the supporting cast "exceptionally good."

Reviewing for the Chicago Sun-Times, Roger Ebert gave the film three out of four stars and described it as "tough, sweet and goofy", as well as "fun and engaging but slight". He believed the overly silly nature of the script is redeemed by "Cassavetes' reliance on a tried-and-true plot construction" and the acting performances, particularly that of Rowlands, who he said "propels the action with such appealing nervous energy that we don't have the heart to stop and think how silly everything is".

Roger Ebert praised Adames' performance, calling him "well cast". Writing for Film Comment in 2017, Shonni Enelow revisited Adames' performance as the "crucial positive negative" that "makes the film work". Adames' performance was criticized by other reviewers, who expected Adames to be "cute and cuddly", and when he was not, they judged that Cassavetes had failed. Canby wrote that Adames "is not especially convincing and he's seldom spontaneous, and because his performance looks to have been directed so obviously, he gives the most Hollywood-like performance in the picture." Adames won the first ever Golden Raspberry Award for Worst Supporting Actor, shared with Laurence Olivier for his role in The Jazz Singer at the 1st Golden Raspberry Awards. He did not have any subsequent film roles.

The film is recognized by American Film Institute in these lists:

- 2003: AFI's 100 Years...100 Heroes & Villains:
  - Gloria Swenson – Nominated Hero

The Japanese filmmaker Akira Kurosawa cited Gloria as one of his favorite films.

In a 2003 review, Slant Magazine praised Rowlands' performance and said that "the supporting cast pales in comparison to Rowlands".

== Legacy ==
A sequel was in the works before Cassavetes' death. The film was remade in 1999 under the same title with a screenplay by Steve Antin. The remake was directed by Sidney Lumet and starred Sharon Stone and Jean-Luke Figueroa.

Other films inspired by Gloria include Erick Zonca's 2008 film Julia, starring Tilda Swinton and Luc Besson's 1994 film Léon: The Professional. In 2013, Paul Schrader was planning his own remake of the film, starring Lindsay Lohan. In 2018, Taraji P. Henson starred in a film loosely inspired by Gloria entitled Proud Mary.

== Accolades ==
| Award | Category | Nominee(s) | Result | Ref. |
|---|---|---|---|---|
| Academy Awards | Best Actress | Gena Rowlands | Nominated | |
| Boston Society of Film Critics Awards | Best Actress | Gena Rowlands | Won | |
| Cahiers du Cinéma | Best Film | John Cassavetes | 10th Place | |
| Golden Globe Awards | Best Actress in a Motion Picture – Drama | Gena Rowlands | Nominated | |
| Golden Raspberry Awards | Worst Supporting Actor | John Adames | Won (Note: Tied with Laurence Olivier for The Jazz Singer.) | |
| Stinkers Bad Movie Awards | Worst Performance by a Child in a Feature Role | John Adames | Nominated | |
| Turkish Film Critics Association Awards | Best Foreign Film | | 3rd Place | |
| Venice International Film Festival | Golden Lion | John Cassavetes | Won (Note: Tied with Atlantic City.) | |
| Venice International Film Festival | OCIC Award (Honorable Mention) | John Cassavetes | Won | |

== See also ==
- List of films of 1980
- Arthouse action film
- New Hollywood

== Bibliography ==
- Cassavetes, John and Raymond Carney (2001). "Chpt 10: Gloria (1978–1980)" in Cassavetes on Cassavetes. Macmillan. ISBN 0-571-20157-1.
- Morris, George (1980). "Lady on the Lam", Texas Monthly. Vol. 8, No. 10. ISSN 0148-7736.
