= 2015 Bronx Legionnaires' disease outbreaks =

Disease outbreaks in New York City, United States

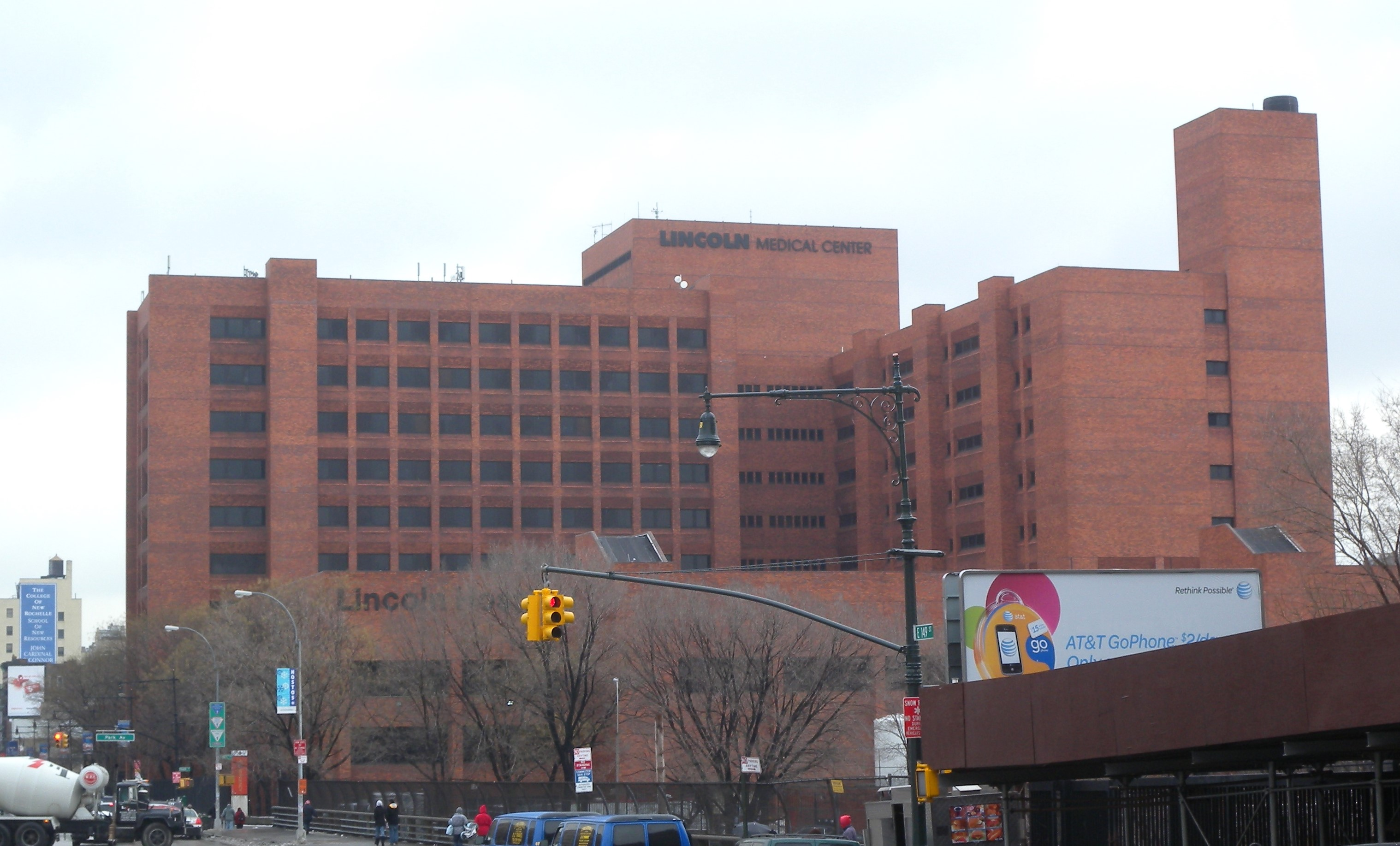
- Lincoln Hospital in the Bronx, one of five buildings where the second outbreak was spread
- Date: December 2014 (first outbreak); July 2015 (second outbreak)
- Duration: 2 months (first outbreak); 1.5 months (second outbreak)
- Location: The Bronx, New York City: first outbreak: Co-op City cooling towers; second outbreak: five buildings including Lincoln Hospital and Concourse Plaza Cooling Towers
- Cause: under investigation
- Outcome: Affected buildings were ordered to be decontaminated within 14 days, under the threat of misdemeanor charges
- Deaths: 10
- Injuries: Over 100

In 2015, there were two outbreaks of Legionnaires' disease in the Bronx, New York City, United States. Between January and August 2015, one hundred and thirty people in New York City were infected with Legionnaires', but the majority of them were in the Bronx.

Legionnaires' disease is an acute type of pneumonia that is caused by the inhalation of aerosolized water containing the Legionella bacteria. Forty-two Legionella species have been classified to date, and these bacteria can grow in areas where there is warm water, such as cooling towers.

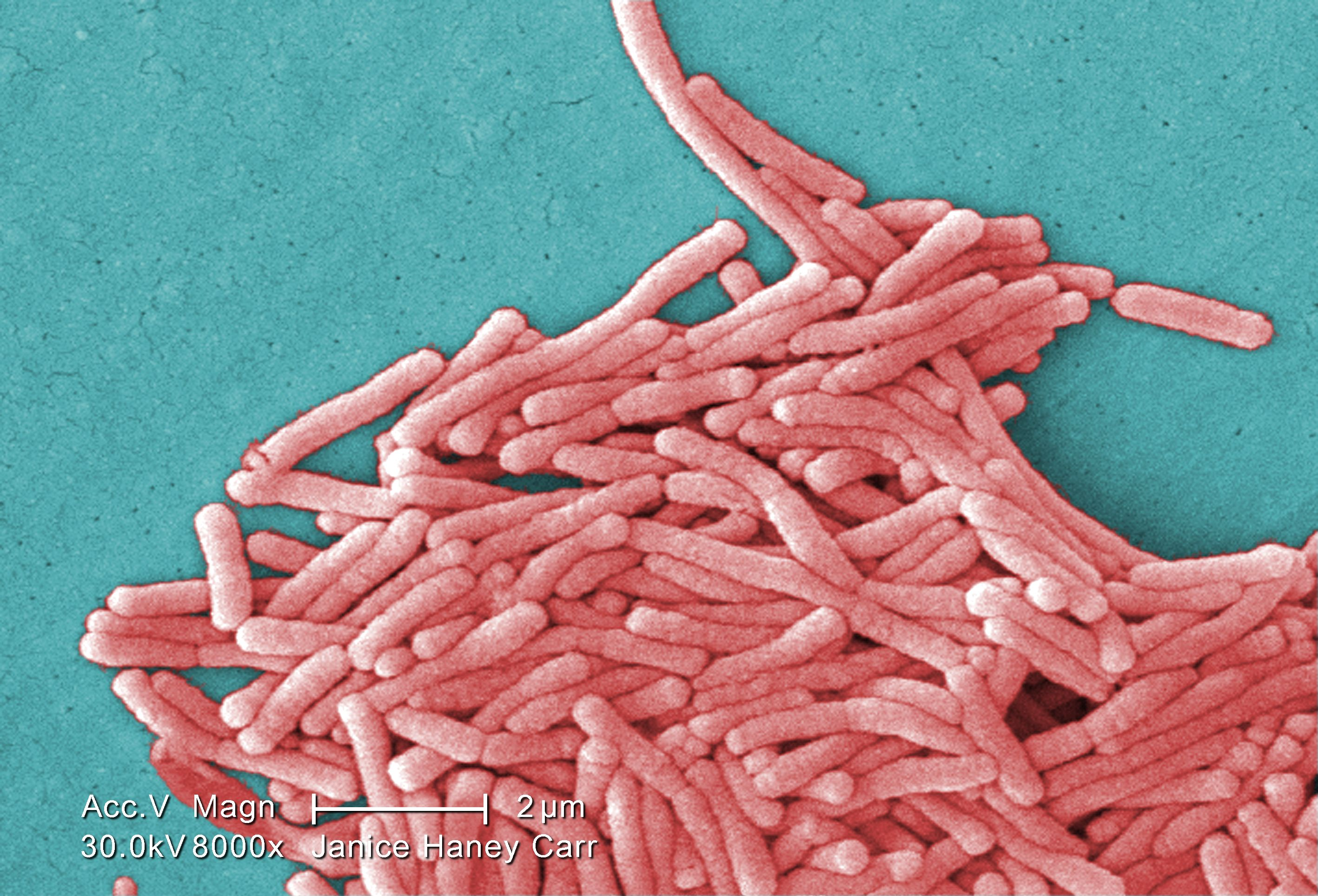
Legionella pneumophila bacteria

== January 2015 ==
In January 2015, Legionnaires' disease sickened 8 people near Co-op City's cooling towers in the northeast Bronx. Twelve people were diagnosed with Legionnaires' disease between December 2014 and the end of the outbreak in January 2015.

== August 2015 ==
In an unrelated July and August 2015 outbreak, the disease affected at least 120 people and caused at least twelve deaths in the South Bronx area. The cause of the outbreak was traced back to the Opera House Hotel on July 10, 2015, and was declared as over as of August 20. Following the Morrisania outbreak, city officials stated that they would be pursuing new regulations for cooling towers. Affected buildings were also ordered to be decontaminated within 14 days, under the threat of misdemeanor charges.

== September 2015 ==
On September 21, 2015, 13 more cases of Legionnaires' disease were identified and were said to be unrelated to the outbreaks from previous months. 35 cooling towers were inspected and 15 of these tested positive for the Legionella bacteria. After the cases surfaced, city officials put legislative programs into effect that require building owners to perform quarterly inspections and to verify that the cooling towers have been tested and are free of the Legionnella bacteria.
