= 1976 Philadelphia Legionnaires' disease outbreak =

Disease outbreak in Pennsylvania, United States

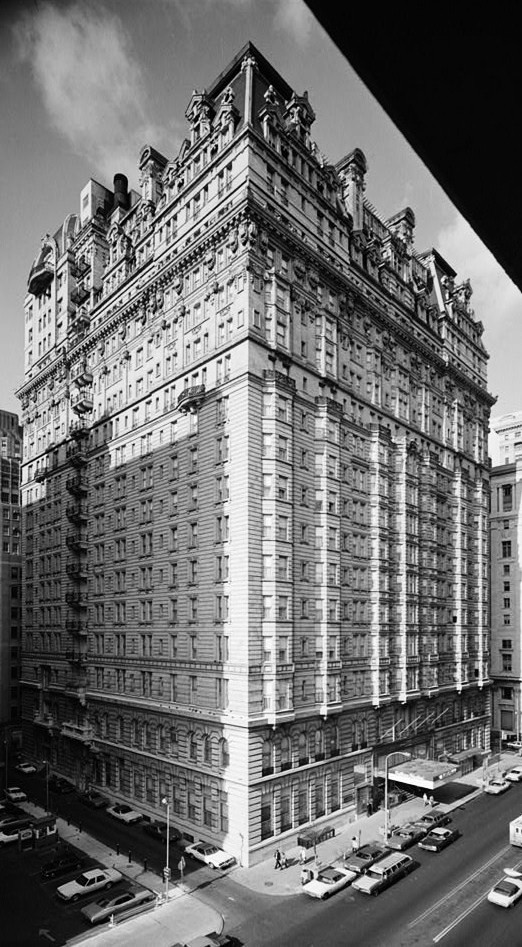
The Bellevue-Stratford Hotel in Philadelphia, site of the first known outbreak of Legionnaires' disease. The hotel closed in November 1976, four months after the outbreak

The 1976 Legionnaires' disease outbreak, occurring in the late summer in Philadelphia, Pennsylvania, at an annual American Legion convention, was the first occasion in which a cluster of a particular type of pneumonia cases were determined to be caused by the Legionella pneumophila bacteria. Previous outbreaks were retroactively diagnosed as being most probably caused by Legionella bacteria.

== Background ==
On July 21, 1976, the American Legion opened its annual three-day convention at The Bellevue-Stratford Hotel in Philadelphia, Pennsylvania. More than 2,000 Legionnaires, mostly men, attended the convention. The date and city were chosen to coincide with America's celebration of the 200th anniversary of the signing of the Declaration of Independence in Philadelphia in 1776.

On July 27, three days after the convention ended, Legionnaire Ray Brennan, a 61-year-old retired US Air Force captain employed as a Legion bookkeeper, died at his home of an apparent heart attack. Brennan had returned home from the convention on the evening of July 24 complaining of feeling tired. On July 30, another Legionnaire, Frank Aveni, aged 60, also died of an apparent heart attack, as did three other Legionnaires. All of them had been convention attendees. Twenty-four hours later, on August 1, six more Legionnaires died. They ranged in age from 39 to 82, and, like the five previous victims, all had complained of tiredness, chest pains, lung congestion, and fever.

Three of the Legionnaires had been patients of Dr. Ernest Campbell, a physician in Bloomsburg, Pennsylvania, who noticed that the only common link between the three was that they had attended the convention. He contacted the Pennsylvania Department of Health. Officials at the American Legion also began getting notices of the sudden deaths of several members, all at the same time. Within a week, more than 130 people, mostly men, had been hospitalized, and 25 were reported dead.

In total, there were 149 Legionnaires who became sick and 33 other persons associated with the hotel or in the area who also became sick. Of these 182 cases, 29 persons died.

== Epidemiology ==
The U.S. Center for Disease Control mounted an unprecedented investigation and, by September, the focus had shifted from outside causes, such as a disease carrier, to the hotel environment itself. In January 1977, the Legionella bacterium was finally identified and isolated and was found to be breeding in the cooling tower of the hotel's air conditioning system, which then spread it through the building. This finding prompted new regulations worldwide for climate control systems.

Complicating the situation was a fear among the public that the original cluster of 14 cases, six of whom died within a few days of each other, represented an outbreak of swine flu. The total number of cases reached 211, and of those, 29 had died. At the time of the outbreak, epidemiological investigation protocols did not include active participation by both laboratory specialists and investigators. No effective communication existed between scientists in the field interviewing patients, and those in the laboratory testing specimens.

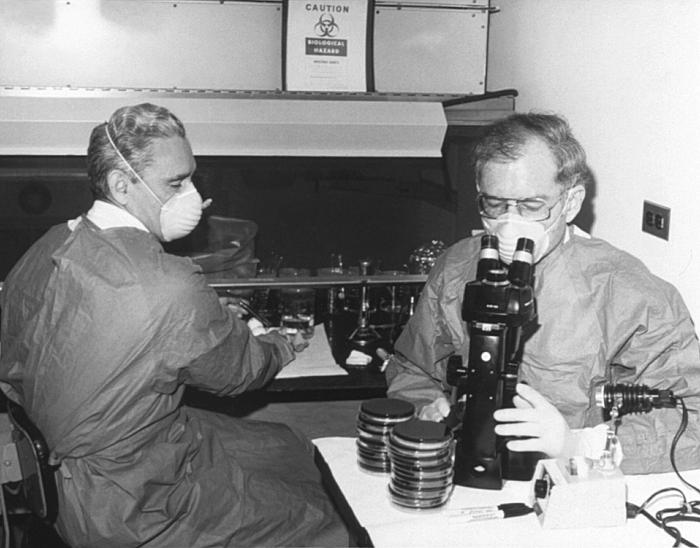
Centers for Disease Control medical technologist George Gorman (left) and Jim Feeley, examining culture plates upon which the first environmental isolates of Legionella pneumophila had been grown

== Discovery of Legionella pneumophila ==
While the Center for Disease Control (as it was called in that era) responded rapidly, as did the Pennsylvania Health Department, it took six months for the CDC microbiologist Joseph McDade to discover the cause of the outbreak. He initially thought the cause was viral because blood and tissues from the patients failed to grow bacteria when incubated in culture medium. His subsequent attempts to isolate the viral agent in eggs included antibiotics to kill off "contaminating" bacteria. It was only when he omitted the antibiotics that the bacteria grew in eggs. Attempts to reproduce the disease in mice, the standard laboratory animal model, also failed. The disease was finally produced in guinea pigs. The CDC announced the discovery at a press conference on January 18, 1977. The bacterium was later named Legionella pneumophila.

Legionella pneumophila is the most common cause, but sometimes other species of Legionella bacteria also cause Legionnaires' disease. The terms "Philadelphia fever" and "Legion fever" appear to have been used at the time of the outbreak and for shortly thereafter, although at least one 2008 source which covers disease in a historical narrative sense also included "Legion fever" as alternate name. Both the World Health Organization in 2018 and the United States Center for Disease Control and Prevention (CDC) in 2017 only use the term Legionnaires' disease to refer to the serious version with pneumonia.

== Retrospective diagnosis of earlier outbreaks as Legionnaires' disease ==
CDC investigators quickly discovered outbreaks of respiratory disease caused by L. pneumophila dating back to 1959.

- An outbreak of what was dubbed Pontiac fever occurred in a health department in Pontiac, Michigan in July 1967. No one died. Although caused by the same bacterium, Pontiac fever is a milder ailment than Legionnaires' disease. Pneumonia is absent in those with Pontiac fever.
- An outbreak of pneumonia in July–August 1965, at St. Elizabeths Hospital in Washington, DC, which killed 16 persons out of 78 infected was later determined to be Legionnaires' disease.
- A September 1974 convention of the Independent Order of Odd Fellows was also held at the very same Bellevue-Stratford Hotel. Out of approximately 1,500 members who attended, 20 developed pneumonia and two died. A later article in The Lancet reported: "Illness [high fever and pneumonia] was significantly associated with attendance at one convention activity held on Monday morning, September 16, 1974, in the grand ballroom of the hotel." Oddly, staff members of the hotel seemed immune to infection and the CDC has yet to discover the reason for this apparent immunity.

== See also ==
- 1999 Bovenkarspel legionellosis outbreak
- List of legionellosis outbreaks
