= Westfriese Flora =

Former annual garden festival in the Netherlands

Coordinates: 52°42′1.4″N 5°15′5″E

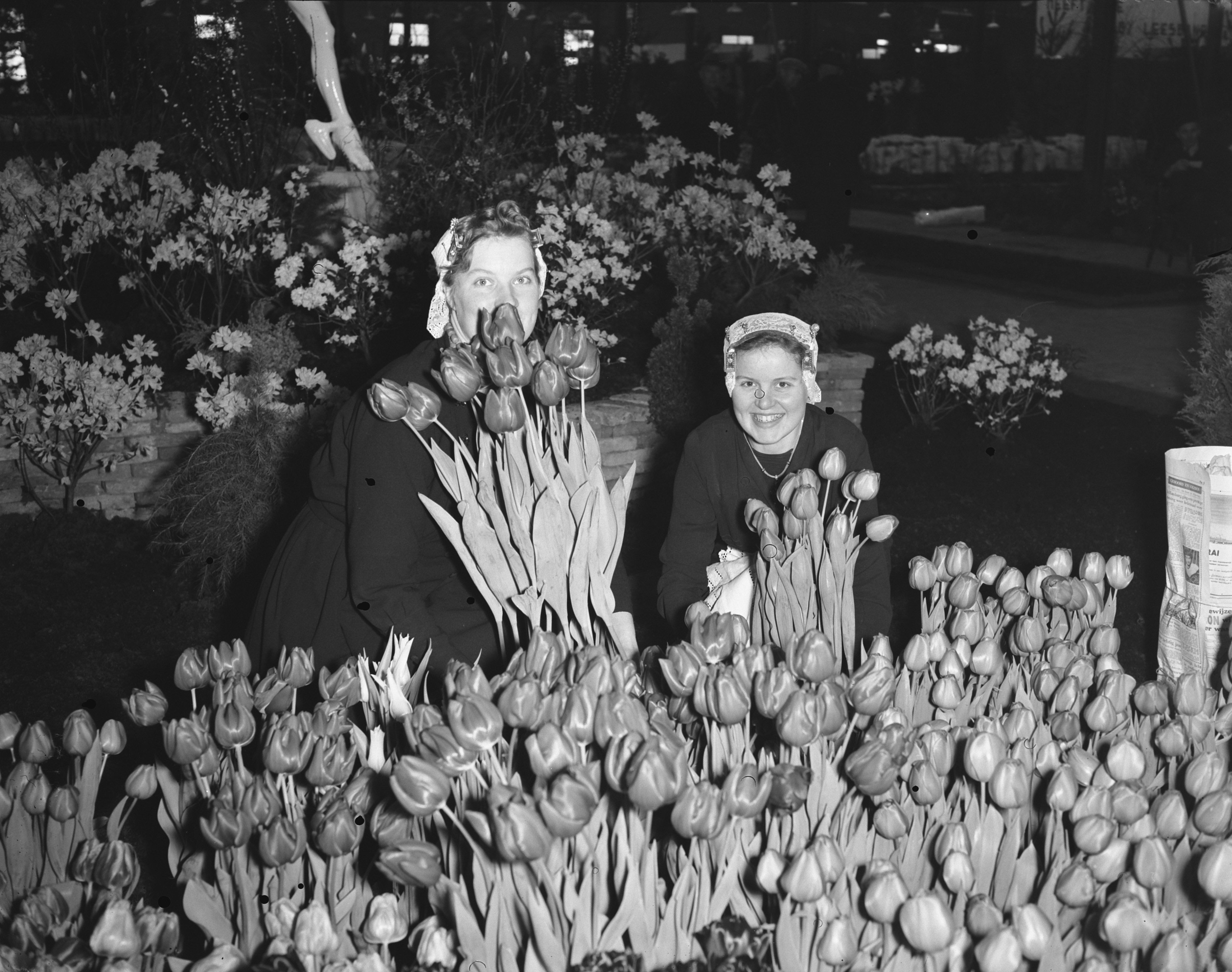
- Preparation for the Westfriese Flora
- Status: Defunct
- Genre: Garden festival
- Begins: 1933
- Ends: 1999
- Frequency: Annual
- Venue: CNB Auction Hall
- Location: Bovenkarspel
- Country: Netherlands
- Most recent: 2018 (as Westfriese Mini Flora)
- Attendance: Up to 100.000 (at peak)

The Westfriese Flora (later renamed Holland Flowers Festival) was an annual garden festival held in Bovenkarspel, Netherlands. Established in 1933, it evolved into the world's largest indoor bulb flower show. The event showcased of tulips, daffodils, hyacinths, and other flowers, functioning both as a trade fair for horticultural professionals and a festive occasion for the general public.

== History ==
The festival was founded in 1933 by local bulb growers' associations in the West Friesland region to promote regional horticulture. Over the years, it gained national prominence, drawing up to 100,000 visitors annually at its peak.

The event expanded to include trade fairs, agricultural exhibitions, livestock displays, and cultural activities such as fashion shows and musical performances. Held annually in February–March, the festival became an important platform for local businesses and tourism. It took place in a large exhibition hall in central Bovenkarspel.

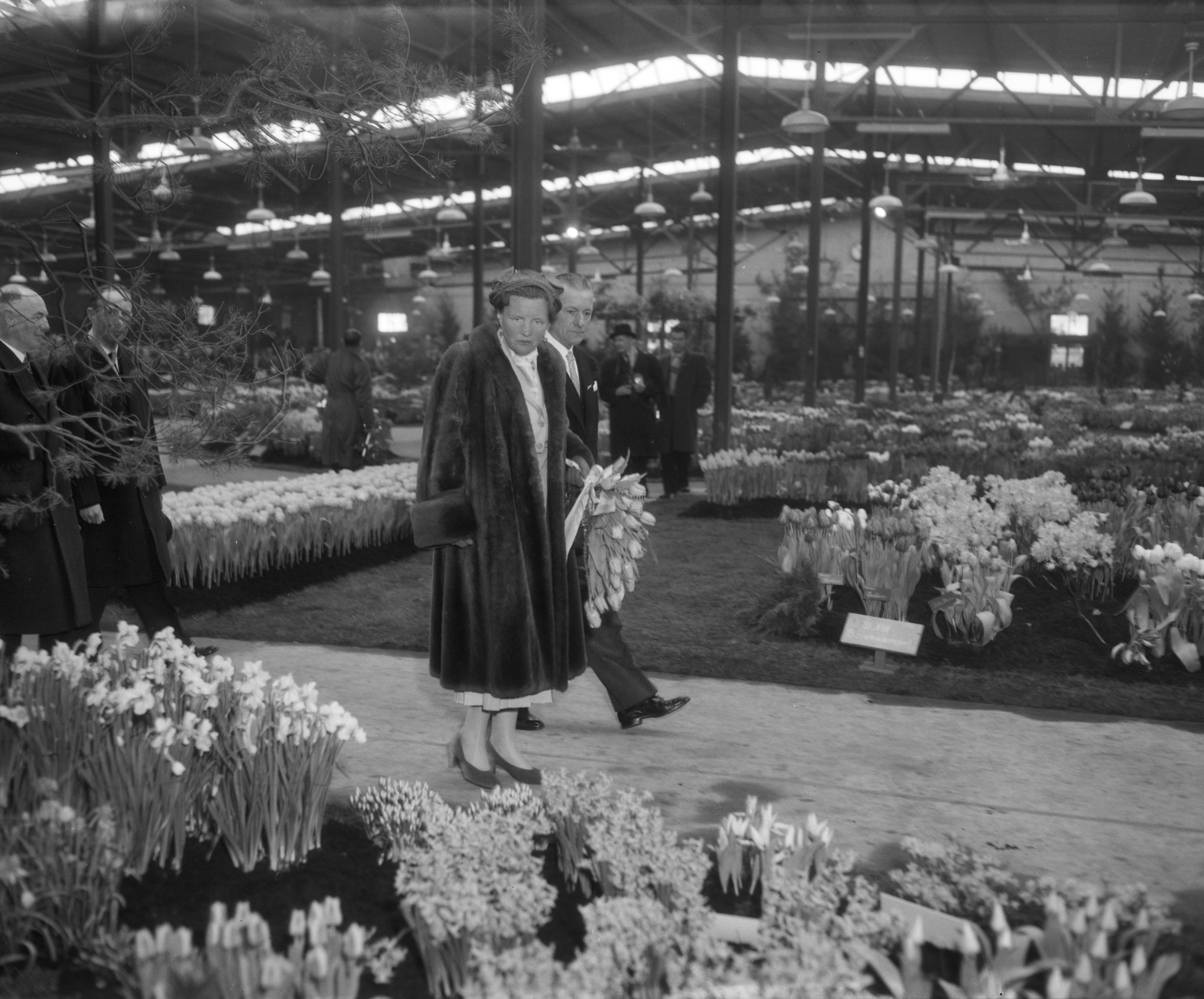
Juliana of the Netherlands visiting the Westfriese Flora

In response to the festival's popularity, the Bovenkarspel Flora railway station was officially opened in 1977 to accommodate increasing visitor numbers. In 1983, the festival celebrated its 50th anniversary, marked by a visit from Queen Juliana of the Netherlands, who formally opened the event.

=== Legionellosis outbreak ===
In 1999, the Westfriese Flora was the site of one of the largest Legionnaires' disease outbreaks in the world. The source was traced to a hot tub on display at the event, resulting in over 200 infections and 32 deaths. The incident received national attention and ultimately led to the permanent discontinuation of the original Westfriese Flora.

=== Later years ===
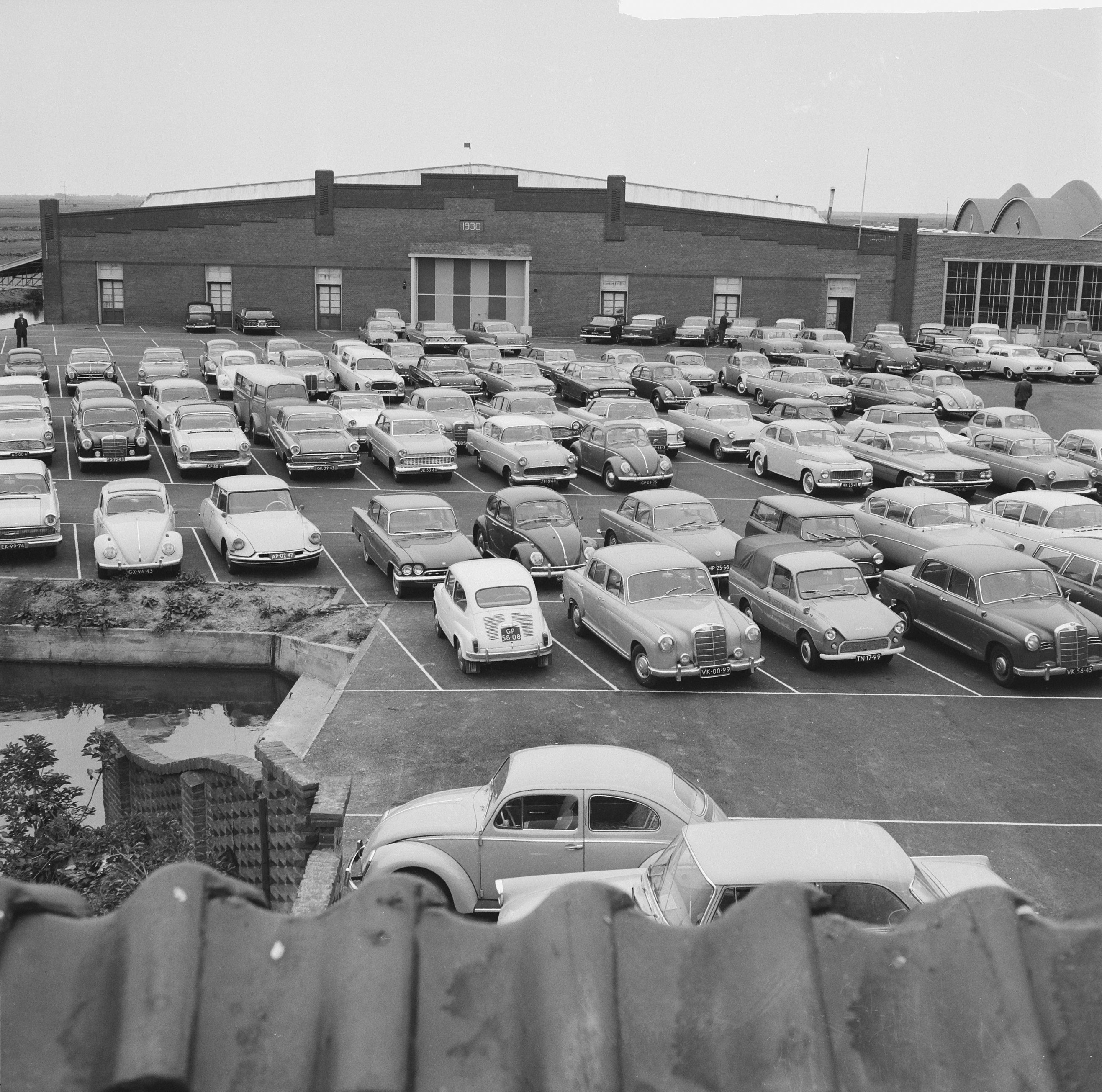
Auction hall, Bovenkarspel

In 2002, the exhibition resumed under the name Holland Flowers Festival, initially still held in Bovenkarspel. It was relocated in 2004 due to the closure of its original venue and was held in Zwaagdijk-Oost until 2010. In 2011, it moved to Middenmeer, outside the West Friesland region.

A new event, Holland Food and Flowers Festival, briefly returned to Bovenkarspel in 2012 and 2013, but was discontinued in 2014. That same year, a smaller-scale version known as the WestFriese mini Flora was held in Bovenkarspel and continued until 2016. As of 2025, no further revival of the original event has taken place.
