= History of water filters =

The history of water filters can be traced to the earliest civilizations with written records. Water filters have been used throughout history to improve the safety and aesthetics of water intended to be used for drinking or bathing. In modern times, they are also widely used in industry and commerce. The history of water filtration is closely linked with the broader history of improvements in public health.

== Antiquity ==
=== Ancient Egypt ===
Images, dating from the 15th to 13th century BCE, on the walls of the tombs of Amenophis II and Ramses II, at Thebes, Egypt, depict the use of, possibly Alum utilising, sedimentation and siphon, water filters; while, New Kingdom, papyrus scrolls record the addition of herbs, such as Amla and Vetive, along with plant seeds, minerals, and charcoal to filtration cisterns.

=== Ancient Greece ===
==== Minoan Greece ====
Before 1100 BCE, sand filter, settlement cisterns, along with ceramic hydraulic filters, fitted inline into the feeding ceramic water pipes, were used to remove sediment from domestic water supplies.

==== Classic Period ====
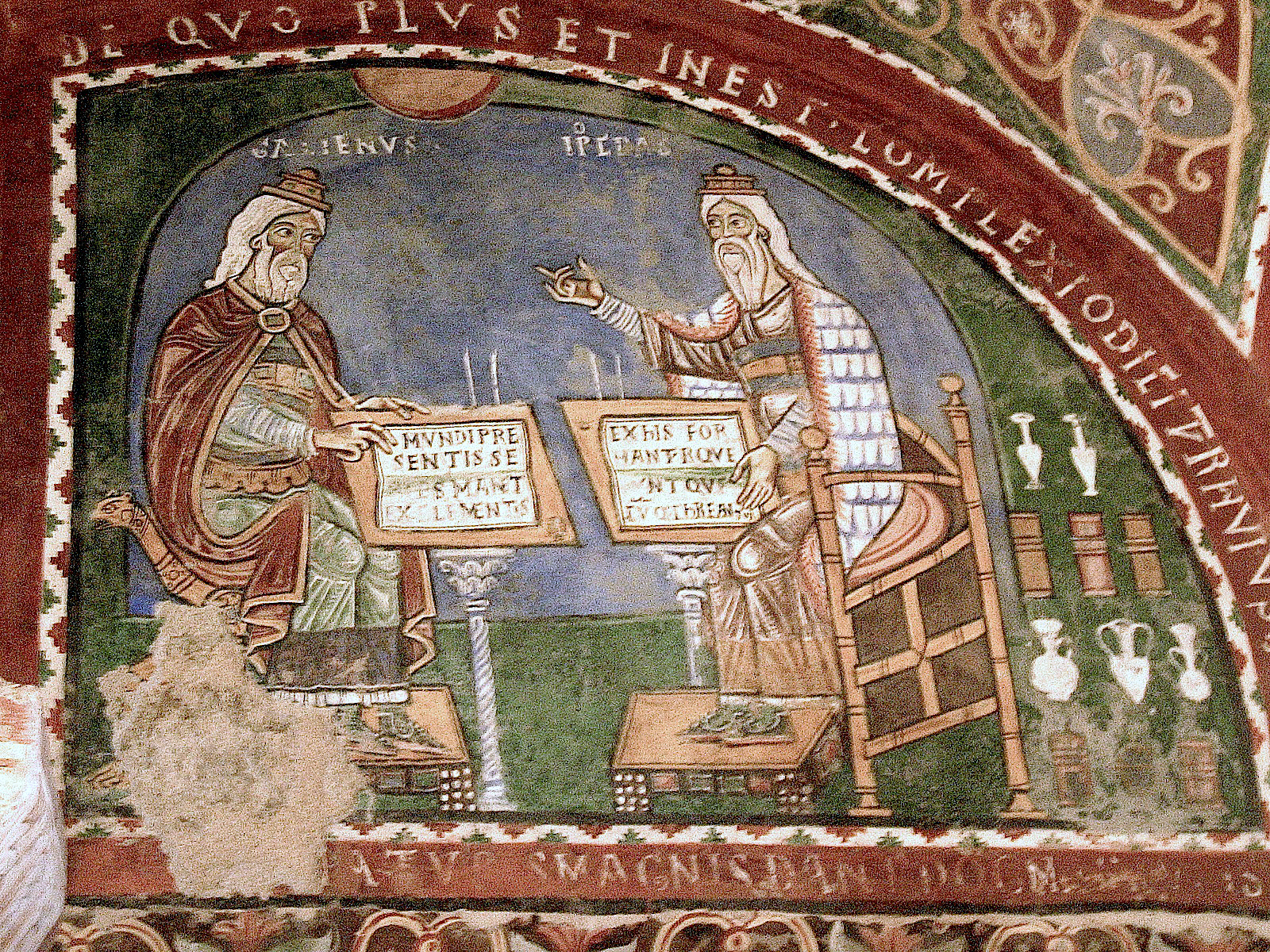
Mural painting of Galen and Hippocrates, from the 12th century. The latter designed a rudimentary water filter.

Hippocrates (c. 460 - 370 BCE) conducted his own experiments in water purification. His theory of the four humors of the body led him to believe that the maintenance of good health required that the four humors be kept in balance. He recommended that feverish patients immerse themselves in a bath of cool water, which would help realign the temperature and harmony of the four humors. Hippocrates believed that water had to be clean and pure. Rainwater was the best water, but had to be boiled and strained before drinking to get rid of the "bad smell" and to avoid hoarseness of the voice. He designed a crude water filter to “purify” the water he used for his patients. Later known as the “Hippocratic sleeve,” this filter was a cloth bag through which water could be poured after being boiled.

Various methods for masking bad water were used: Diophanes of Nicaea of the first century BC advised putting macerated laurel into rainwater, Paxamus proposed that bruised coral or pounded barley, in a bag, be immersed in bad tasting water.

=== Ancient India ===
The Sushruta Samhita (3rd or 4th century CE, Gupta text) specified various methods, including: boiling and heating water under the sun. The text also recommends filtering water through sand and coarse gravel.

=== Mesoamerica ===
The Classic Maya at Palenque made household water filters using locally abundant limestone carved into a porous cylinder, made so as to work in a manner strikingly similar to Modern ceramic water filters.

== Medieval Period ==
The eighth century Arabian alchemist, Gerber, described various stills for purifying water that used wick siphons — to transfer water from one vessel to another.Persian engineer Al-Karaji (c. 953 – c. 1029) wrote a book, The Extraction of Hidden Waters, which gave an early description of a water filtration process.

== Modern history ==
Sir Francis Bacon in his famous compilation "A Natural History of Ten Centuries" 1627 (Baker & Taras, 1981) discussed desalination and began the first scientific experimentation into water filtration. He believed that if seawater was allowed to percolate through the sand, it would be purified of salt. He thought that sand particles would obstruct the passage of salt in the water. Although his hypothesis was proven incorrect, it marked the beginning of a new interest in the field.

An experiment of sand filtration was illustrated by the Italian physician Lucas Antonius Portius. He wrote about the multiple sand filtration method in his work "Soldier's Vade Mecum". He illustrated water filtration experiment by using three pairs of sand filters.

Fathers of microscopy, Antonie van Leeuwenhoek and Robert Hooke, used the newly invented microscope to observe for the first time small material particles that lay suspended in the water, laying the groundwork for the future understanding of waterborne pathogens.

=== Sand filter ===
Original map by John Snow showing the clusters of cholera cases in the London epidemic of 1854.

The first documented use of sand filters to purify the water supply dates to 1804, when the owner of a bleachery in Paisley, Scotland, John Gibb, installed an experimental filter, selling his unwanted surplus to the public. This method was refined in the following two decades by engineers working for private water companies, and it culminated in the first treated public water supply in the world, installed by engineer James Simpson for the Chelsea Waterworks Company in London in 1829. This installation provided filtered water for every resident of the area, and the network design was widely copied throughout the United Kingdom in the ensuing decades.

The practice of water treatment soon became mainstream, and the virtues of the system were made starkly apparent after the investigations of the physician John Snow during the 1854 Broad Street cholera outbreak. Snow was sceptical of the then-dominant miasma theory that stated that diseases were caused by noxious "bad airs". Although the germ theory of disease had not yet been developed, Snow's observations led him to discount the prevailing theory. His 1855 essay On the Mode of Communication of Cholera conclusively demonstrated the role of the water supply in spreading the cholera epidemic in Soho, with the use of a dot distribution map and statistical proof to illustrate the connection between the quality of the water source and cholera cases. His data convinced the local council to disable the water pump, which promptly ended the outbreak.

=== Regulation ===
The Metropolis Water Act introduced the regulation of the water supply companies in London, including minimum standards of water quality for the first time. The Act "made provision for securing the supply to the Metropolis of pure and wholesome water", and required that all water be "effectually filtered" from 31 December 1855. This was followed up with legislation for the mandatory inspection of water quality, including comprehensive chemical analyses, in 1858. This legislation set a worldwide precedent for similar state public health interventions across Europe. The Metropolitan Commission of Sewers was formed at the same time, water filtration was adopted throughout the country, and new water intakes on the Thames were established above Teddington Lock. Automatic pressure filters, where the water is forced under pressure through the filtration system, were innovated in 1899 in England.

Limited drinking water standards were first implemented in the US in 1914, but it would not be until the 1940s that federal drinking water standards were widely applied. In 1972, the Clean Water Act passed through Congress and became law, requiring industrial plants to proactively improve their waste procedures in order to limit the effect of contaminants on freshwater sources. In 1974, the Safe Drinking Water Act was adopted by all 50 U.S. states for the regulation of public water systems within their jurisdictions.

== Softening and ion exchange ==
By the early 1900s, water treatment experimentation had turned from the prevention of waterborne diseases to the creation of softer, less-mineralized water. Water softeners, which use sodium ions to replace water-hardening minerals in water, were first introduced into the water treatment market in 1903.

The theory of ion exchange involves replacing undesirable or potentially harmful ions with more desirable or harmless ones. This is implemented in domestic water treatment system as water softeners. These not only remove calcium ions, but also lead and other heavy metals from water.

== See also ==
- Hot tub
- History of water supply and sanitation
