= Concourse Plaza Hotel =

Former hotel in the Bronx, New York

Coordinates: 40.827185°N 73.921896°W

The Concourse Plaza Hotel was a luxury hotel at Grand Concourse and East 161st Street in the Concourse neighborhood of the Bronx in New York City. Once the site of presidential campaign stops and host to major sports stars, it is now a senior citizens' residence owned and operated by the government of New York City.

== History ==
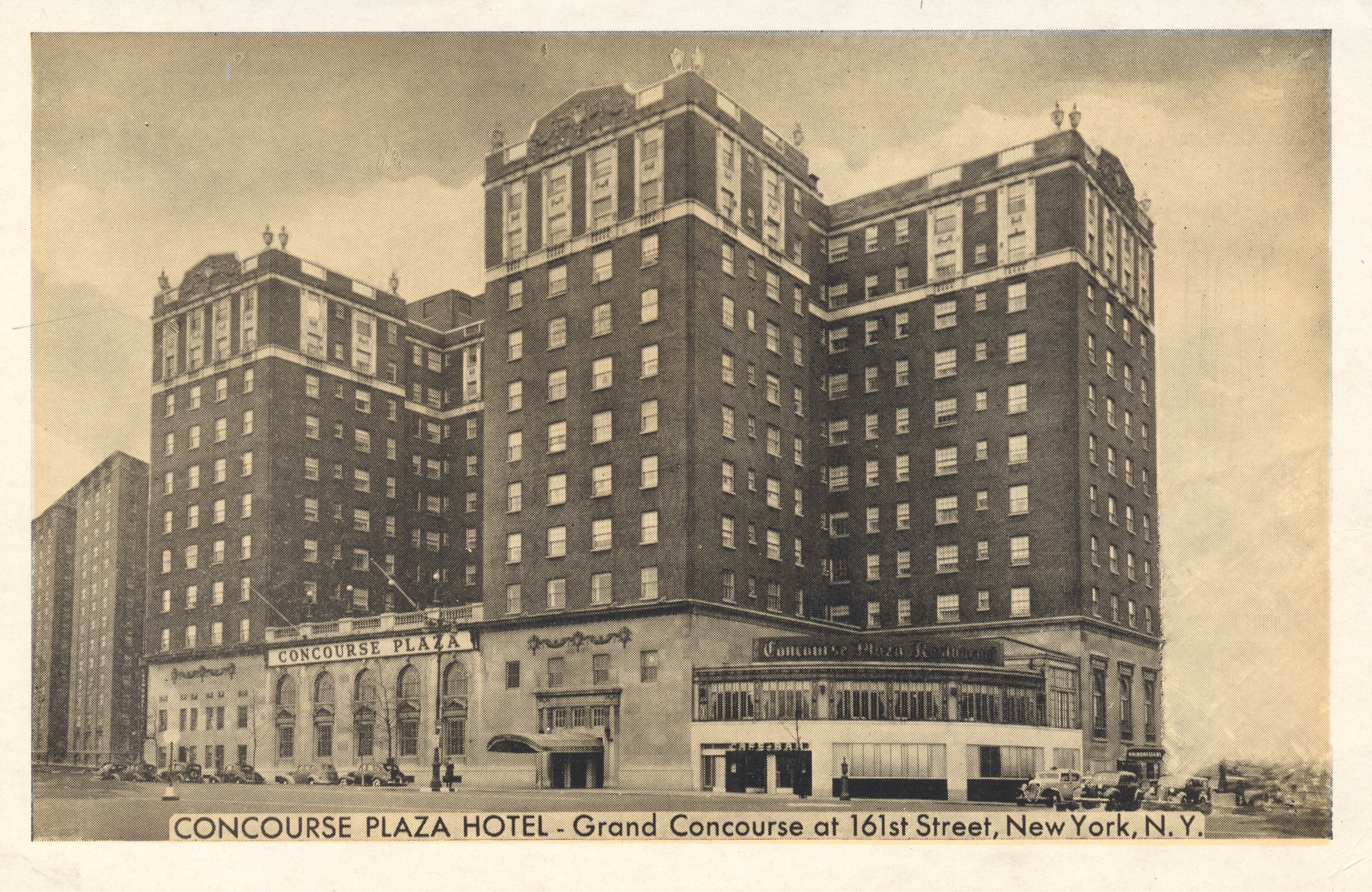
Concourse Plaza Hotel, 1930s

=== Halcyon days ===
Groundbreaking for the 12-story hotel took place in 1922, and it was opened in a lavish ceremony on October 22, 1923. Al Smith, the governor of New York and the guest speaker for the event, praised the hotel by stating, “After seeing this new structure, I am convinced that anything can go in the Bronx.”

The hotel was within walking distance of Yankee Stadium, which was home to baseball’s New York Yankees and (until 1973) football’s New York Giants. Many star players from the home teams – including Babe Ruth, Mickey Mantle and Roger Maris of the Yankees and Frank Gifford of the Giants – stayed at the Concourse Plaza, and visiting players would also stay at the hotel. Yankees second-baseman Horace Clarke was reportedly the last Yankees player to make the hotel his in-season residence during the 1960s and early 1970s.

The hotel maintained a grand ballroom, four smaller banquet halls, and two meeting/dinner rooms. For years it was the best location in the Bronx for social, business and fraternal events. Tito Puente's band played in the grand ballroom every New Year's Eve for a dance that drew 1200 people. Political campaigns would stop by the hotel for rallies and fund raising events, and one of the most whimsical events occurred when John F. Kennedy, the Democratic Party candidate for the U.S. presidency, was greeted at the hotel on November 5, 1960 with a sign that read “The home of the knishes thinks Jack is delicious.” There were two kitchens in the hotel. The Banquet kitchen was about half a block long. It was quite a sight to see the waiters lined up in the kitchen prepared to serve a banquet, serving spoons or soup ladles in hand. There was a second, kosher kitchen on the north side of the building. On most weekends both kitchens were in full operation, serving many parties. It looked like a scene from Kafka's "Amerika." The caterers also catered off the premises parties in numerous locations. These were served with food prepared at the Concourse Plaza. There is a secret about the hotel. Below the basement was a sub basement, known to very few people. There was a private rifle range there.

=== Decline and sale ===
The hotel began to experience financial difficulties in 1957, when it was purchased by Nassau Management Corporation for $1.25 million. The company was unable to maintain financial control of the property, and it changed hands again in early 1958. At that time the hotel was operated by three groups of people. One group leased and ran the rooms, a second the banquet halls and kitchens, a third the restaurant.

During the 1960s, problems in the neighborhood surrounding the hotel diminished its value as a lodging location, and by 1968 it was seen as a "welfare hotel" when it began to provide housing to poor families who relied on the New York City government for shelter. In the early 1970s the manager of the rooms was shot and killed by an irate customer. In 1974, the city government purchased the hotel and later transformed the property into a senior citizens residence.

== In film ==
The hotel and its ballroom have played important roles in several films. Marty (1955) - which won 3 Academy Awards including best picture, Ernest Borgnine in the title role won Best Actor in a Leading Performance - and Paddy Chayefsky, who won for Best Writing - Adapted Screenplay.

It was featured in The Catered Affair (1957) with Ernest Borgnine, Bette Davis, Barry Fitzgerald, Debbie Reynolds and Rod Taylor. It was directed by Richard Brooks and written by Paddy Chayefsky (original play) and Gore Vidal (screenplay).

The hotel was also used by director John Cassavetes as a filming location for his 1980 drama Gloria.

== See also ==
- 2015 New York Legionnaires' disease outbreak
