= Hot tub =

Large tub for hydrotherapy or pleasure

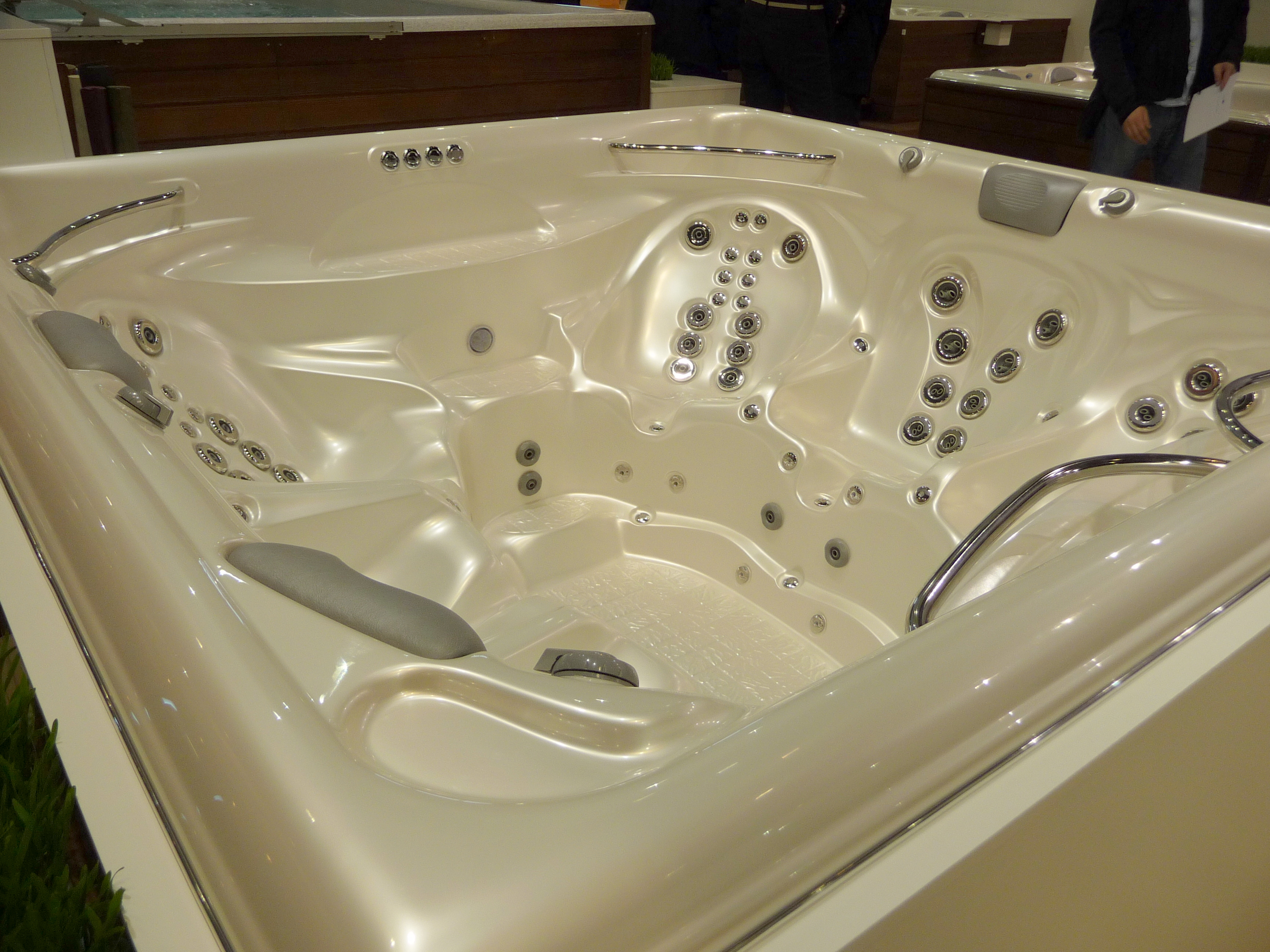
A 5-seat hot tub with a cast acrylic shell, supported by a frame structure, showing vents for water circulation and massage

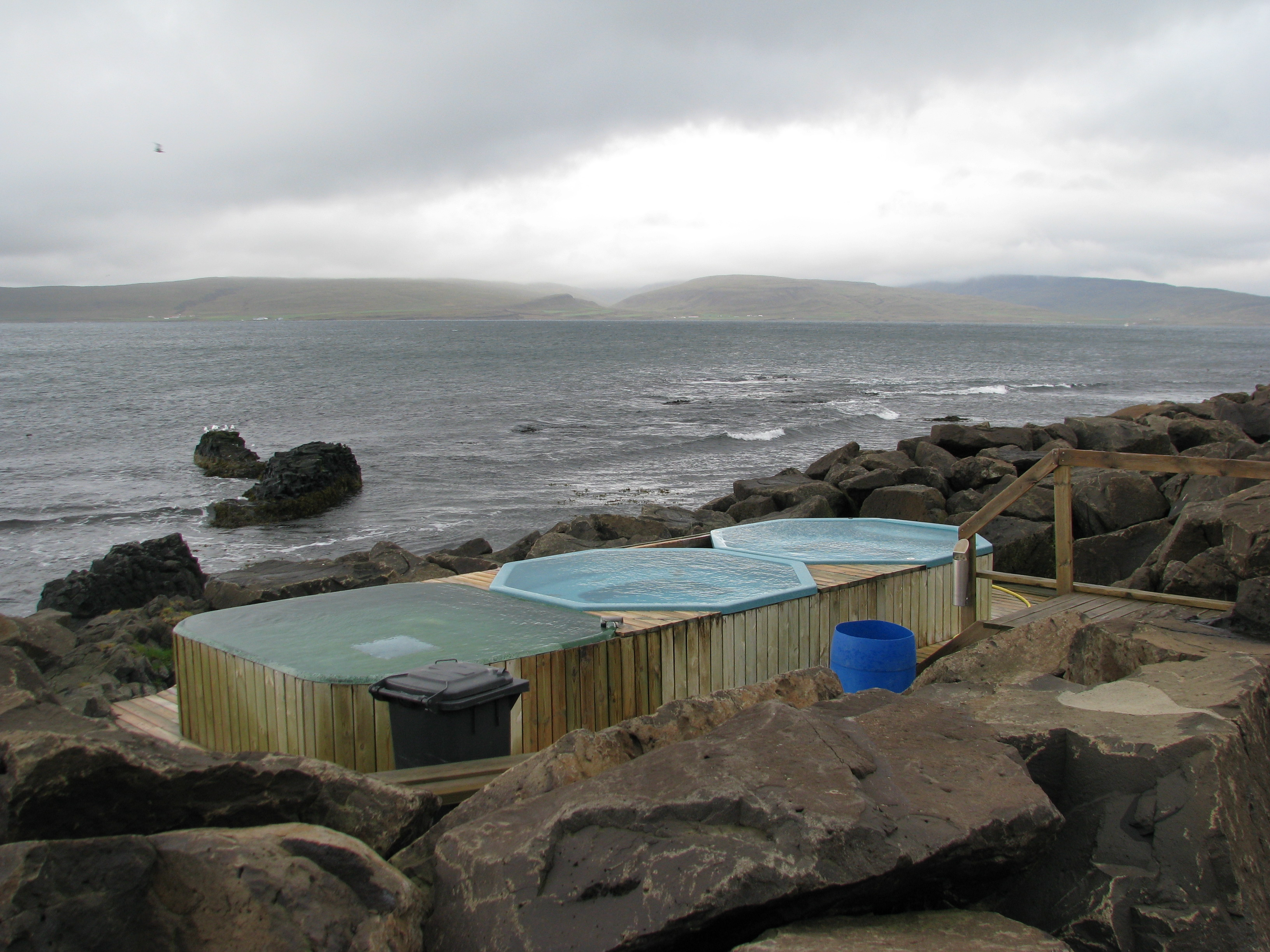
Outdoor hot tubs

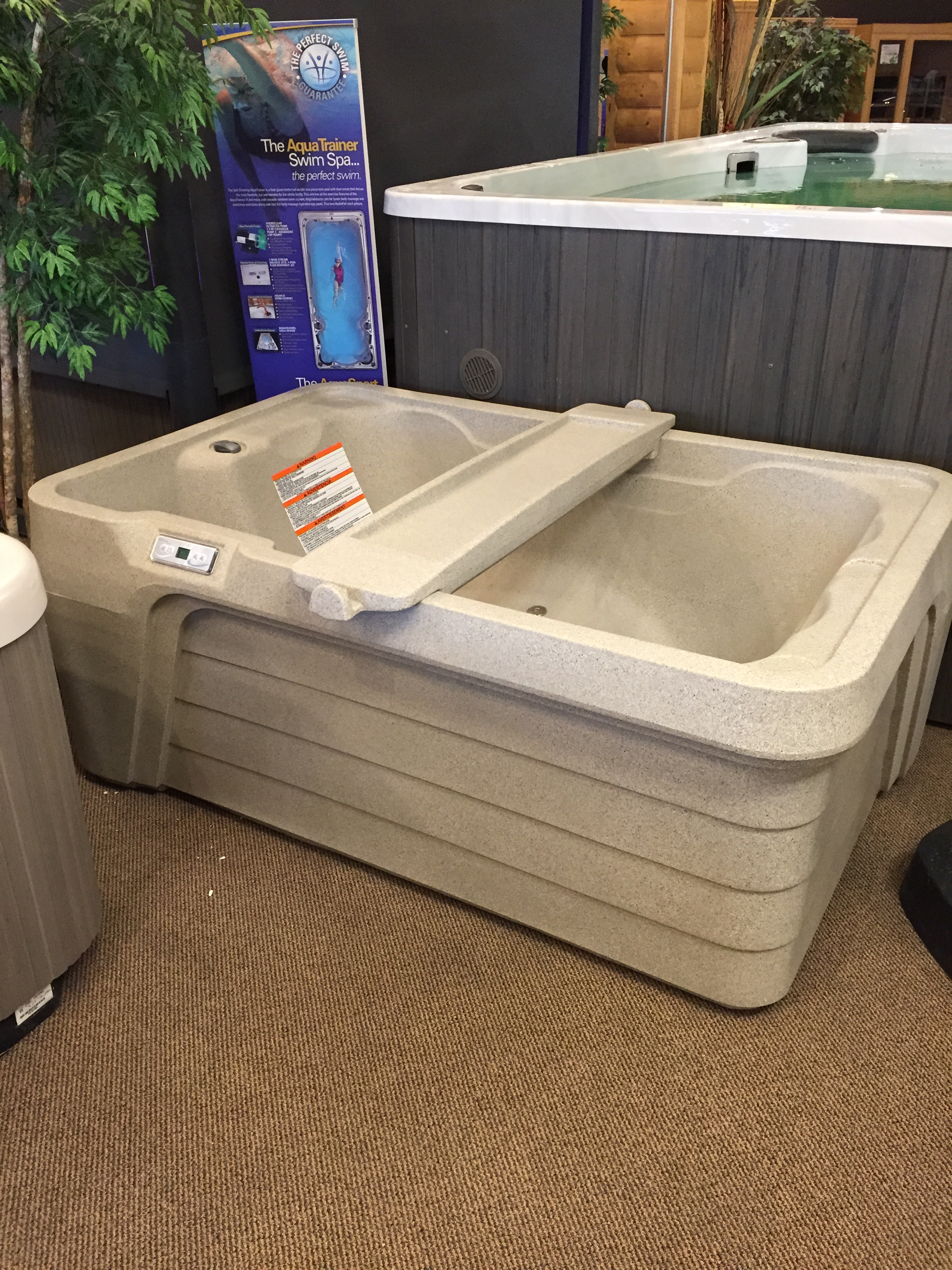

A hot tub is a large tub full of water used for hydrotherapy, relaxation or pleasure. Some have powerful jets for massage purposes. Hot tubs are sometimes also known as "spas" or by the trade name Jacuzzi. Hot tubs may be located outdoors or indoors.

In contrast to a typical bathtub, a hot tub is designed to be used by more than one person at a time, with many models accommodating four or more people. Unlike baths, soaps and shampoos are not used in wet-jetted hot tubs (although they can be used in air-jetted hot tubs). Home hot tubs are often closer in construction to standard bathtubs, while the construction of a public hot tub often has more in common with a swimming pool, of which it can be considered a type.

== History ==
The earliest hot tubs were calderas in which hot stones were placed to heat the water. Therma in Ikaria has been visited for hydrotherapy ever since the 4th century BCE

In 737 CE, Japan's first onsen opened near Izumo, Shimane, and centuries later, the first ryokan (inns) were built, offering food, accommodations, and soaking tubs called ofuro.

In ancient Rome, there were three types of baths: baths at home (balnea), private baths (balnea privata), and public baths (balnea publica). The practice of bathing was so ingrained that Roman legions built their own baths at mineral and thermal springs in newly conquered lands, examples of which still exist across Europe.

In the 1940s, hot tubs began to appear in the U.S., inspired by the Japanese ofuro. Hydrotherapy pumps were introduced by Jacuzzi. Fiberglass shells for hot tubs appeared around 1970 and were soon superseded by cast acrylic shells.

== Water treatment ==
=== Plumbing ===
Hot tub plumbing consists of:

- A pressure system delivering water to the jets.
- A suction system returning water to the pumps.
- A filtration system to help clean the water. Some models use a separate small filter pump running constantly, while others use programmable main pumps.
- Induced air: The jets may use a Venturi effect to aerate the water stream for a lighter massage effect; this requires another set of hoses.
- Some models use an air blower to force air through a separate set of jets for a different "bubbly" massage effect; this is a separate system from induced air.
- An ozone system; ozonation is a common adjunct to water maintenance, and if installed will have its own set of hoses and fittings.

=== Heating and energy use ===
Hot tubs are usually heated using an electric or natural gas heater, though there are also submersible wood fire hot tub heaters, as well as solar hot water systems. Hot tubs are also found at natural hot springs; in this case, the water may be dangerously hot and must be combined with cool water for a safe soaking temperature.

Effective insulation greatly improves the energy efficiency of a hot tub. There are several different styles of hot tub insulation: some manufacturers fill the entire cabinet with foam, while others insulate the underside of the shell, the inside of the cabinet, or both. Many manufacturers advertise the superiority of their approach to insulation, but few independent side-by-side comparisons are available. The hot tub pump and hot tub heater represent most of the power consumption in a hot tub and vary in use of power depending on their size.

Energy efficiency of portable hot tubs has been studied by the Pacific Gas and Electric Company (PGEC), leading to industry responses and interest from both the California Energy Commission and Natural Resources Canada. California's portable electric hot tub listing include R values of thermal insulation, and standby watts.

In 2019 an update to the ANSI standard for energy efficiency was approved. For the first time, this new standard increases the minimum energy efficiency level for portable spas and inflatable spas. Hot tub covers have been shown to reduce most of the evaporative losses from the pool when not in use. With this component of heat loss being 70%, a cover with even a small R-value is able to achieve as much as a 75% reduction in heating costs when used as opposed to leaving the water surface exposed.

There are several different types of spa covers. Some covers are better for insulation and therefore are lighter on internal parts and energy efficiency. Some examples of covers are insulated, aluminum, rolling, or a tonneau.

=== Sanitation and water quality ===
Since some hot tubs are not drained after each use it is necessary to treat the water to keep it attractive and safe. It must be neither too alkaline nor too acidic, and must be sanitised to stay free of harmful microorganisms. Partly due to their high water temperatures, hot tubs can pose particular health risks if not regularly maintained: outbreaks of Legionnaires' disease have been traced to poorly sanitized hot tubs. Typically chlorine or bromine are used as sanitizers, but salt water chlorination is increasingly common.

Sanitation can also be aided by a non-chemical ozonator.

For aesthetic reasons, and for the sanitizer to work properly, water should be neither too alkaline nor too acidic (low pH). The hardness level of the water, measured as the amount of dissolved calcium, is also important. Insufficient hardness can lead to corrosion and water foaming. The ideal range of calcium hardness in hot tub water should be between 150 and 250 ppm.

== Types ==
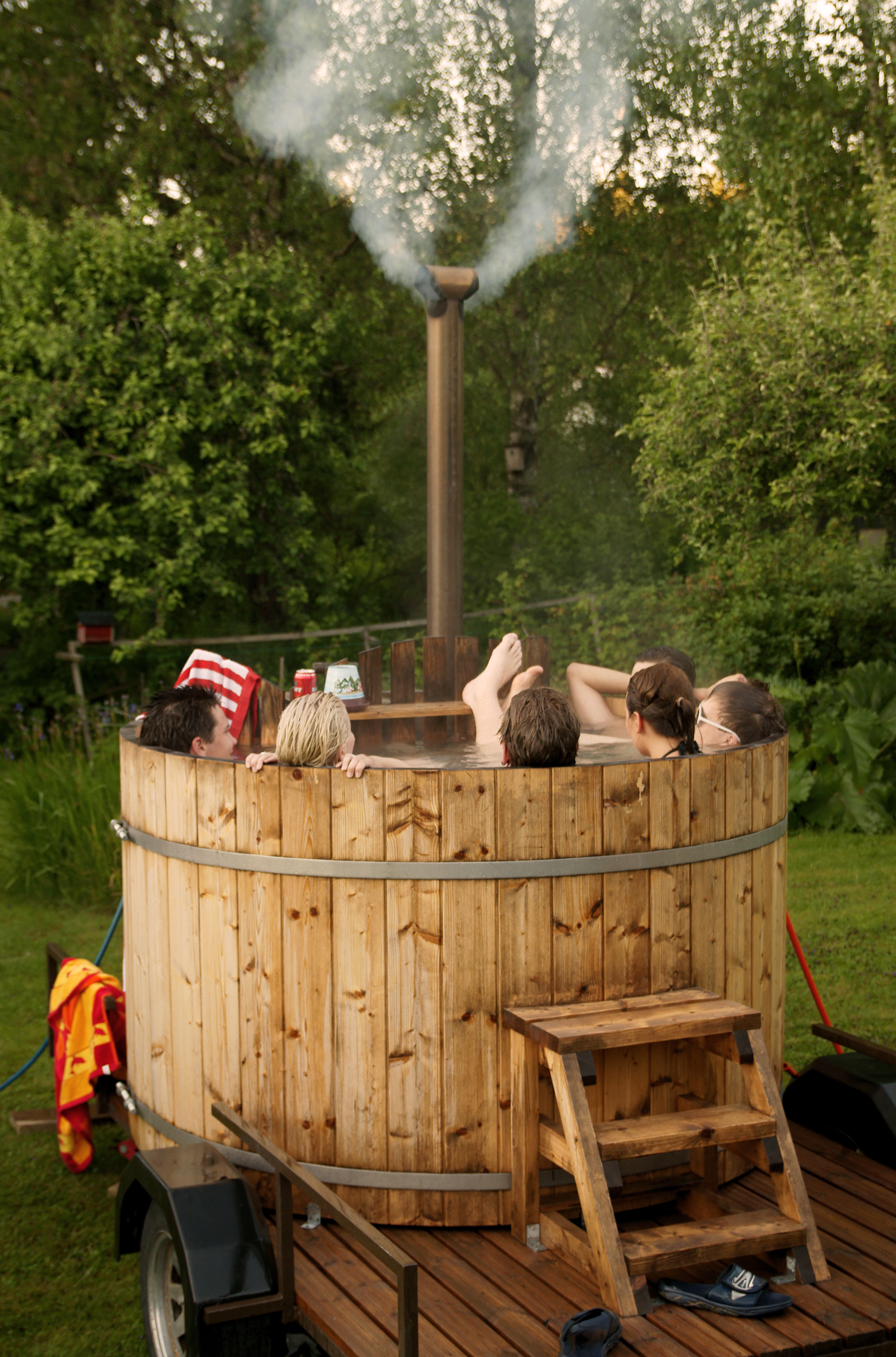
Wooden hot tub on a trailer, Finland

- Portable vinyl-liner hot tub: these are cheaper and smaller, and require less power, e.g. 110–120 V 15 A household power circuits in North America.
- Roto-molded hot tubs are constructed with the shell and surrounding cabinet as a single piece. They have molded seating.
- Acrylic: these hot tubs have a cast acrylic shell, supported by a frame structure, and are usually surrounded by a skirt of either cedar or simulated wood-grain plastic. They typically can seat two to seven persons or more.
- Cement: hot tubs can also be built of cement, above ground, or in ground like a small swimming pool.
- Wooden hot tubs: round wooden hot tubs peaked in popularity in the 1970s, having now been replaced by modern construction methods. Wooden hot tubs are often made of redwood or cedar and assembled from vertical staves and the structure is held together like wooden barrels, with metal bands.
- Stainless steel hot tubs can be made in any shape and size and are extremely durable.
- Fiberglass hot tub: glass-reinforced polyester (GRP) hot tubs are made of a plastic matrix reinforced by fine fibers of glass.
- Inflatable PVC hot tubs. An inflatable hot tub is an air-filled spa structure. Air is pumped into a vinyl skin that expands and creates a solid form. Most commonly round in shape.

== Safety ==
Sitting in water above normal body temperatures can cause drowsiness which may lead to unconsciousness and subsequently result in drowning. The U.S. Consumer Product Safety Commission (CPSC) recommends that water temperatures never exceed 40 degrees Celsius (104 °F). A temperature of 37 degrees Celsius (100 °F) is considered safe for a healthy adult. Soaking in water above 39 degrees Celsius (102 °F) can cause fetal damage during the first three months of pregnancy.

It is also recommended to install residual-current devices for protection against electrocution. The greater danger associated with electrical shock in the water is that the person may be rendered immobile and unable to rescue themselves or to call for help and then drown.

Hot tubs and spas are equipped with drains that can create powerful suction and between 1980 and 1996, the CPSC had reports of more than 700 deaths in spas and hot tubs, about one-third of which were drownings to children under age five. In the same period 18 incidents were reported to the CPSC involving body part entrapment. To reduce the risk of entrapment, US safety standards require that each spa have two drains for each pump, reducing the amount of suction. From 1999 to 2007 there were 26 reports to the CPSC concerning circulation entrapments hot tubs and spas, including three deaths.

In 2001 and in 2012 the CPSC issued recalls for spa heaters which overheated and caused fires.

The Uniform Swimming Pool, Spa and Hot Tub Code is a model code developed by the International Association of Plumbing and Mechanical Officials (IAPMO) to govern the installation and inspection of plumbing systems associated with swimming pools, spas and hot tubs as a means of promoting the public's health, safety and welfare.

== Disease risk ==
Poorly sanitized hot tubs have been linked to a number of diseases, principally caused by facultative anaerobic bacteria. Such incidents include hot tub folliculitis and legionellosis.

== Gallery ==
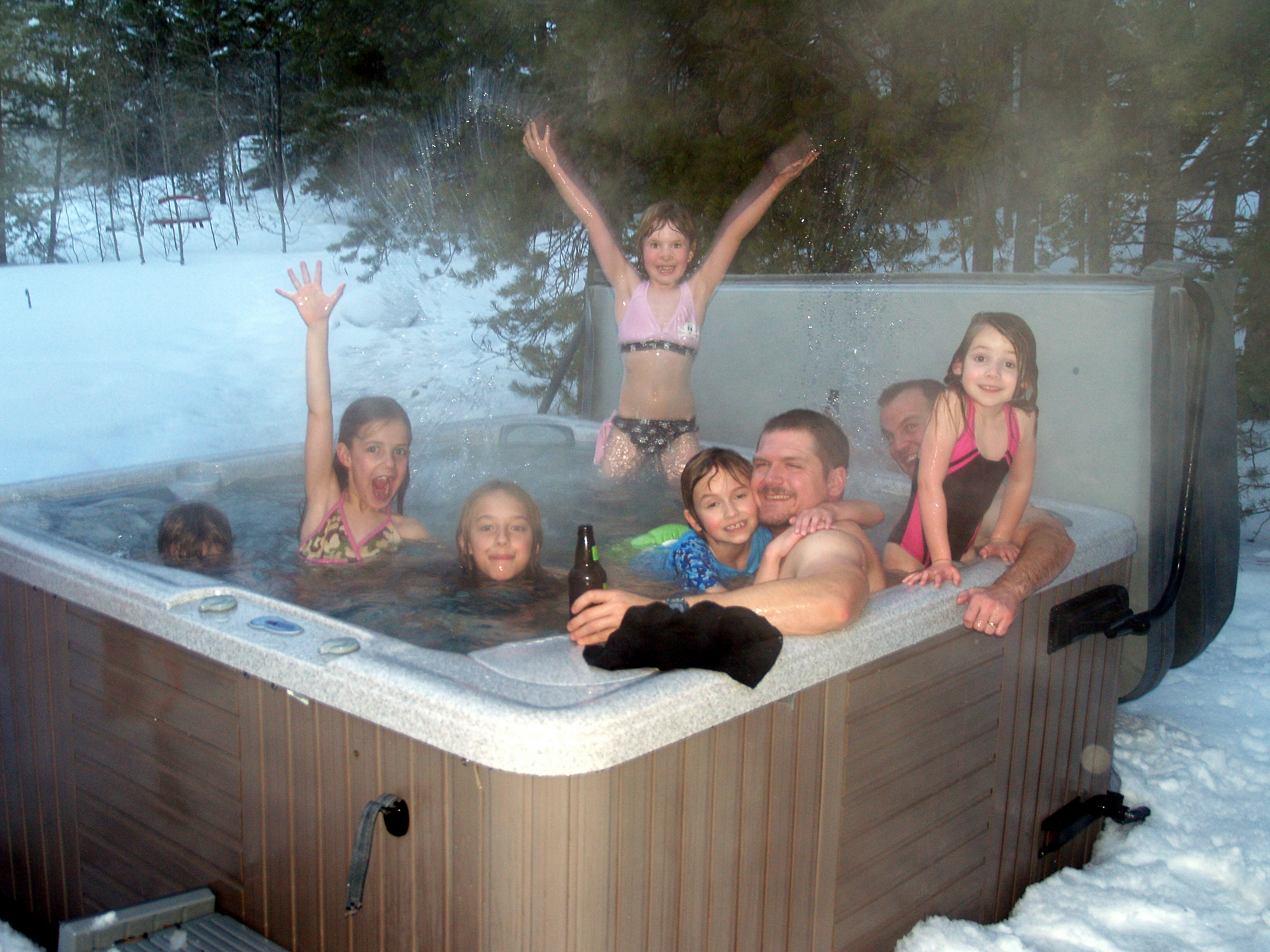
Bathers enjoying a hot tub in the winter in Keystone, Colorado

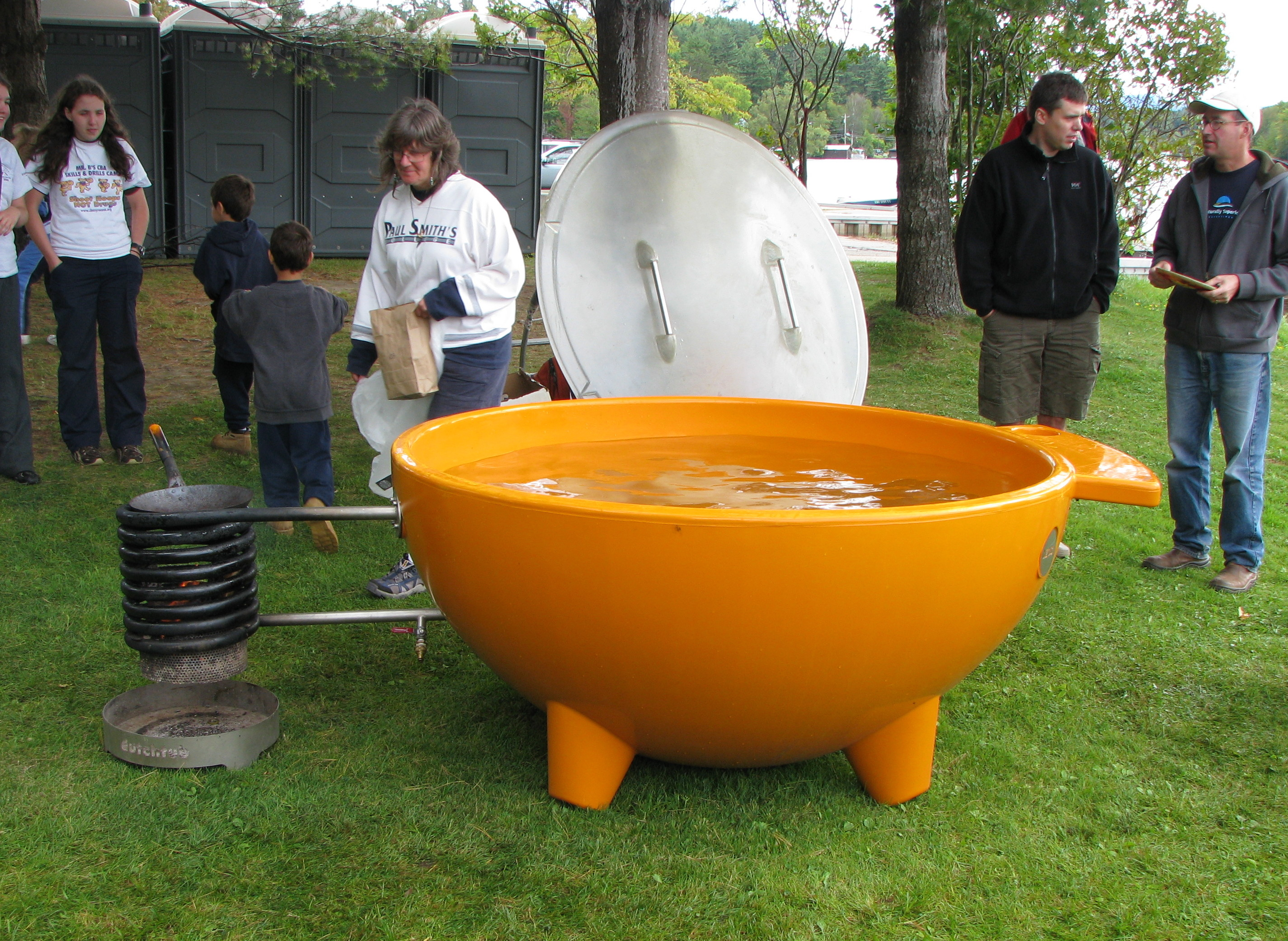
Wood-fired hot tub at the Adirondack Canoe Classic, Saranac Lake, NY

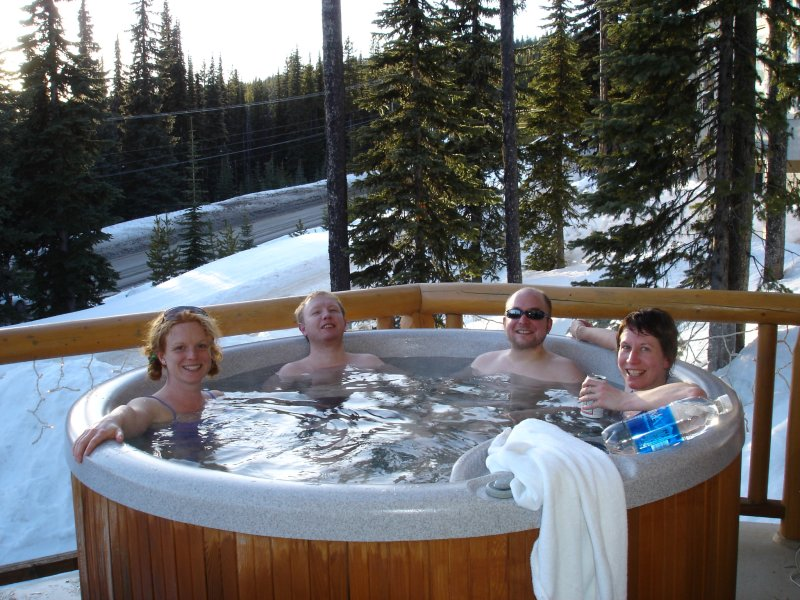
A hot tub at the Big White Ski Resort, Canada

== See also ==
- Finnish sauna
- History of water filters
- Sauna
- Steam shower
- Victorian Turkish baths
- Whirlpool tub
