= David Murdoch (medical researcher) =

New Zealand researcher, Dean and Head of Campus at University of Otago, Christchurch

9th Vice-Chancellor of the University of Otago
- In office February 2022 – June 2023
- Chancellor: Stephen Higgs
- Preceded by: Harlene Hayne
- Succeeded by: Grant Robertson

Personal details
- Born: 10 July 1962 (age 64) Dunedin, New Zealand
- Awards: Distinguished Research Medal (2020); Outstanding Leadership Award (2020)

Academic background
- Education: University of Otago
- Thesis: Diagnosis of legionella infection: role of PCR and other techniques for testing non-respiratory samples (2003)

Academic work
- Discipline: paediatric infectious diseases

David R. Murdoch (born 10 July 1962) is a New Zealand academic specialising in paediatric infectious diseases, especially pneumonia. He has also worked on Legionnaires' disease and has advised the Oxford University vaccine group and the New Zealand government on COVID-19. Murdoch served as Vice-Chancellor of the University of Otago between February 2022 and June 2023.

== Early life and education ==
Murdoch was born in Dunedin in 1962, and was educated at Ōpoho Primary School, before moving to Christchurch at six years old. Murdoch graduated from the University of Otago in 1985 with a Bachelor of Medicine and Bachelor of Surgery.

Murdoch also holds a Doctorate in Medicine from the University of Otago, completed in 2003, a Master of Science in Epidemiology from the University of London, a Diploma in Tropical Medicine and Hygiene from the University of Liverpool and a Diploma from the London School of Hygiene and Tropical Medicine.

== Research ==
Murdoch became interested in childhood infectious diseases after a trip to Nepal, working in one of Sir Edmund Hillary's mountain hospitals, where he saw the effects of measles on the local population. His work on Legionnaires' disease led to the establishment of a New Zealand-wide surveillance system.

Murdoch led a Bill and Melinda Gates Foundation-funded global study of childhood pneumonia, which changed the way the disease is diagnosed, and led to new treatments and preventative measures in developing countries. Murdoch is co-director of the One Health Aotearoa research alliance, which is a group of infectious disease experts from the University of Otago's medical school, Massey University's veterinary school and the Institute of Environmental Science and Research (ESR), who are working together to address health hazards across the human, animal and environmental interfaces.

=== Appointments ===
Murdoch was one of three international experts advising Oxford University on its vaccine against COVID19.

He was Head of Pathology in Christchurch for 14 years, including the period after the Canterbury earthquakes. He was appointed Dean of the University of Otago, Christchurch in 2016. In July 2021 it was announced that Murdoch will take over the role of Vice-Chancellor of the University of Otago from acting Vice-Chancellor Helen Nicholson in early 2022.

Murdoch began his tenure in February 2022 and announced that "creating change" would be his "highest priority" following a review into allegations of racism at the School of Physical Education, Sport and Exercise Sciences. Under his leadership, Otago University embarked on a proposal to change its logo with its coat of arms replaced by a Māori cultural symbol tohu and a new Māori name for the university. In March 2023, Murdoch went on sick leave with Dr. Helen Nicholson taking over as acting-Vice Chancellor. In mid-June 2023, Murdoch resigned as Vice-Chancellor of the University of Otago, roughly 18 months after assuming the job. Murdoch will return to Otago's Canterbury campus as a distinguished professor.

== Awards and honours ==
Murdoch received the University of Otago's Distinguished Research Medal in 2020. He also won the Outstanding Leadership Award at the university in 2020.

Murdoch is a Fellow of the Royal Australasian College of Physicians (infectious diseases), and also of the Royal College of Pathologists of Australasia. In 2005 he was made a Fellow of the Infectious Diseases Society of America, and in 2019 he was made a Fellow of the American Academy of Microbiology.

Murdoch was made an Honorary life member of the Himalayan Rescue Association of Nepal in 1988, and an Honorary member of the Holistic Health Society – Nepal, for "outstanding service and contribution in the health sector of Nepal" in 2017.

== Selected publications ==
- Namrata Prasad; David R. Murdoch; Hugh Reyburn; John A. Crump (30 June 2015). "Etiology of Severe Febrile Illness in Low- and Middle-Income Countries: A Systematic Review". PLOS One. 10 (6) e0127962. Bibcode:2015PLoSO..1027962P. doi:10.1371/JOURNAL.PONE.0127962. ISSN 1932-6203. PMC 4488327. PMID 26126200.
- Orin S Levine; Katherine L O'Brien; Maria Deloria-Knoll; et al. (April 2012). "The Pneumonia Etiology Research for Child Health Project: a 21st century childhood pneumonia etiology study". Clinical Infectious Diseases. 54 (suppl 2): S93-101. doi:10.1093/CID/CIR1052. ISSN 1058-4838. PMC 3297546. PMID 22403238.
- Patricia Priest; Leah Toombs-Ruane; Jackie Benschop; Sara Burgess; Nigel French; David Murdoch (2 January 2017). "A One Health future to meet the AMR challenge?". New Zealand Veterinary Journal. 65 (2): 60–61. doi:10.1080/00480169.2016.1270651. ISSN 0048-0169. PMID 27973990.
- Nora L Watson; Christine Prosperi; Amanda J Driscoll; et al. (1 June 2017). "Data Management and Data Quality in PERCH, a Large International Case-Control Study of Severe Childhood Pneumonia". Clinical Infectious Diseases. 64 (suppl 3): S238–S244. doi:10.1093/CID/CIX080. ISSN 1058-4838. PMC 5447839. PMID 28575357.
- Emma Kenagy; Patricia C Priest; Claire Cameron; Debbie Smith; Pippa Scott; Vicki Cho; Peter Mitchell; David R Murdoch (1 July 2017). "Risk Factors for Legionella longbeachae Legionnaires' Disease, New Zealand". Emerging Infectious Diseases. 23 (7): 1148–1154. doi:10.3201/EID2307.161429. ISSN 1080-6040. PMC 5512494. PMID 28628460.
