= Patricia Priest =

New Zealand public health scientist, epidemiologist

- Education: University of Oxford
- Scientific career
- Workplaces: University of Otago
- Thesis: Antibacterial use and antibacterial resistance in the community (2001)

Patricia Priest is a New Zealand public health scientist and epidemiologist who is Professor of Public Health in Medicine at the University of Otago. Throughout the COVID-19 pandemic, Priest served as an advisor to the New Zealand Ministry of Health. She was awarded an Ig Nobel Prize in 2010. As of 2024 Priest is the Acting Pro-Vice-Chancellor of the Division of Health Sciences at the university.

== Early life and education ==
Priest was a doctoral researcher at the University of Oxford. She investigated the relationship between prescribing antibiotics and antibiotic resistance in the community.

== Research and career ==
Priest's research considers epidemiology and public health. In 2010, Priest and collaborators Lianne Parkin and Sheila Williams were jointly awarded an Ig Nobel Prize, which is awarded by Annals of Improbable Research for bizarre scientific discoveries. They were recognised for their work that identified walking with socks over shoes resulted in a frosty floor feeling less slippery than people walking without socks.

Priest studied the relationship between gardening and contracting Legionnaires' disease. She identified that Legionella longbeachae, which is present in compost and potting soil, could contribute to infection with Legionnaires' disease.

During the COVID-19 pandemic, Priest was appointed to the New Zealand Ministry of Health Technical Advisory Group, where she oversaw activity on epidemiology. She was responsible for advising the Ministry on surveillance and monitoring for COVID-19. Early in 2020, Priest recommended that people wear masks to limit transmission of the virus. She was worried that students would be responsible for spreading COVID-19.

In 2022, Priest was appointed as the acting Pro-Vice-Chancellor of the Division of Health Sciences at the University of Otago.

== Selected publications ==
- David R Murdoch; Sandy Slow; Stephen T Chambers; et al. (1 October 2012). "Effect of vitamin D3 supplementation on upper respiratory tract infections in healthy adults: the VIDARIS randomized controlled trial". JAMA. 308 (13): 1333–1339. doi:10.1001/jama.2012.12505. ISSN 0098-7484. PMID 23032549. Wikidata Q34303576.
- Sarah Jefferies; Nigel French; Charlotte Gilkison; et al. (October 2020). "COVID-19 in New Zealand and the impact of the national response: a descriptive epidemiological study". Lancet Public Health. doi:10.1016/s2468-2667(20)30225-5. ISSN 2468-2667. PMC 7553903. PMID 33065023. Wikidata Q100397055.
- Irene Higginson; P Priest; M McCarthy (1 February 1994). "Are bereaved family members a valid proxy for a patient's assessment of dying?". Social Science & Medicine. 38 (4): 553–557. doi:10.1016/0277-9536(94)90251-8. ISSN 0277-9536. PMID 7514313. Wikidata Q51136627.
