= Gisela Sole =

New Zealand physiotherapy professor

Academic background
- Education: University of Otago, Stellenbosch University, University of Cape Town
- Thesis: Neuromuscular control of thigh and gluteal muscles following hamstring injuries (2008)

Academic work
- Institutions: University of Otago

Gisela Sole is a South African–New Zealand academic physiotherapist, and is a full professor at the University of Otago, specialising in sports injuries and management of musculoskeletal conditions.

== Academic career ==
Sole completed a Bachelor of Science in Physiotherapy at Stellenbosch University, and a Master of Science in Medicine at the University of Cape Town. She became interested in anterior cruciate ligament research when she was working in a South African hospital, and saw that conservative treatment often led to loss of function for knee extension. Sole also worked as a clinician in Switzerland. Sole completed a PhD titled Neuromuscular control of thigh and gluteal muscles following hamstring injuries at the University of Otago. Sole joined the faculty of the university, rising to full professor in 2023, and is the deputy dean of the School of Physiotherapy.

Sole is interested in mechanisms of injury and rehabilitation, but also how people are affected by their injury, pain and rehabilitation experiences. She has researched patient experiences of rehabilitation, the long-term effects such as fear of re-injury, and has examined conditions such as rotator cuff related shoulder pain and anterior cruciate ligament injury. She co-leads a team that is developing a framework for managing concussions in secondary schools. In 2023 Sole was part of a team awarded a Health Research Council of New Zealand grant to research a stepped care model for people with persistent shoulder pain. Her team's work on shoulder health won the Champion Project of Pain@Otago award in 2021.

== Selected works ==
- Sole, Gisela; Hamrén, Jonas; Stephan Milosavljevic; Nicholson, Helen; Sullivan, Stephen John (2007). "Test-Retest Reliability of Isokinetic Knee Extension and Flexion". Archives of Physical Medicine and Rehabilitation. 88 (5): 626–631. doi:10.1016/j.apmr.2007.02.006. PMID 17466732. Wikidata Q57655779.
- Ho, Chung-Yee Cecilia; Sole, Gisela; Munn, Joanne (2009). "The effectiveness of manual therapy in the management of musculoskeletal disorders of the shoulder: a systematic review". Manual Therapy. 14 (5): 463–474. doi:10.1016/j.math.2009.03.008. PMID 19467911. Wikidata Q37495192.
- Kaur, Mandeep; Ribeiro, Daniel; Theis, Jean-Claude; Webster, Kate; Sole, Gisela (2016). "Movement Patterns of the Knee During Gait Following ACL Reconstruction: A Systematic Review and Meta-Analysis". Sports Medicine. 46 (12): 1869–1895. doi:10.1007/s40279-016-0510-4. PMID 26936269. Wikidata Q38758531.
- Sole, Gisela; Stephan Milosavljevic; Nicholson, Helen; Sullivan, Stephen John (2011). "Selective Strength Loss and Decreased Muscle Activity in Hamstring Injury". Journal of Orthopaedic & Sports Physical Therapy. 41 (5): 354–363. doi:10.2519/jospt.2011.3268. PMID 21289455. Wikidata Q57655772.
- Radzimski, Andy Oliver; Annegret Mündermann; Sole, Gisela (2011). "Effect of footwear on the external knee adduction moment - A systematic review". Knee. 19 (3): 163–175. doi:10.1016/j.knee.2011.05.013. PMID 21733696. Wikidata Q37898287.
- Manlapaz, Donald; Sole, Gisela; Prasath Jayakaran; Chapple, Cathy (2019). "Risk Factors for Falls in Adults with Knee Osteoarthritis: A Systematic Review". Physical Medicine and Rehabilitation. 11 (7): 745–757. doi:10.1002/pmrj.12066. PMID 30609282. Wikidata Q90883251.
- Ashokan Arumugam; Stephan Milosavljevic; Woodley, Stephanie; Sole, Gisela (2012). "Effects of external pelvic compression on form closure, force closure, and neuromotor control of the lumbopelvic spine--a systematic review". Manual Therapy. 17 (4): 275–284. doi:10.1016/j.math.2012.01.010. PMID 22386280. Wikidata Q37990147.
