= Naomi Cogger =

New Zealand epidemiologist

Academic background
- Thesis: Epidemiology of musculoskeletal injuries in two and three year old Australian thoroughbred racehorses (2006)

Academic work
- Institutions: Massey University
- Doctoral students: Eloise Jillings

Naomi Cogger is an Australian–New Zealand epidemiologist, and is a professor at Massey University, specialising in the epidemiology of animal diseases that impact animal and human health, and food security.

== Academic career ==
Cogger completed a PhD titled Epidemiology of musculoskeletal injuries in two and three year old Australian thoroughbred racehorses at the University of Sydney in 2006. Cogger then joined the faculty of Massey University, and was appointed Professor of Epidemiology in 2022. Cogger is the Director of Massey's EpiCentre, which was established in 1986 as an "international focus group for veterinary epidemiology and public health".

Cogger's research focuses on animal disease epidemiology, especially those diseases that impact animal and human health. She develops surveillance strategies for animal disease, including involvement in designing a new surveillance system for the UK for Trichinella, and conducts risk analysis for animal product importation. Cogger has also developed and delivered training programmes for medical and veterinary staff to recognise and respond to diseases. Cogger initially worked on diseases that impact equine health, and injuries and conditions affecting racehorses. She has also researched issues affecting working and service dogs, and more recently has applied her research to plant diseases.

Cogger is part of the Asia Pacific Consortium of Veterinary Epidemiology (APCOVE), a collaboration established to improve the capacity for veterinary disease detection in the region.

== Selected works ==
- Cogger N; Perkins N; Hodgson DR; Reid SW; Evans DL (2006). "Risk factors for musculoskeletal injuries in 2-year-old Thoroughbred racehorses". Preventive Veterinary Medicine. 74 (1): 36–43. doi:10.1016/j.prevetmed.2006.01.005. PMID 16481055. Wikidata Q82564006.
- N Cogger; D L Evans; D R Hodgson; S W Reid; N Perkins (2008). "Incidence rate of musculoskeletal injuries and determinants of time to recovery in young Australian Thoroughbred racehorses". Australian Veterinary Journal. 86 (12): 473–480. doi:10.1111/j.1751-0813.2008.00359.x. PMID 19076769. Wikidata Q43888843.
- Firestone, Simon; Naomi Cogger; Ward, Michael Patrick; Jenny-Ann L M L Toribio; Moloney, Barbara; Navneet K Dhand (2012). "The influence of meteorology on the spread of influenza: survival analysis of an equine influenza (A/H3N8) outbreak". PLOS One. 7 (4) e35284. Bibcode:2012PLoSO...735284F. doi:10.1371/journal.pone.0035284. PMC 3335077. PMID 22536366. Wikidata Q34247183.
- Sarah Rosanowski; N Cogger; Rogers, Chris; Benschop, Jacqueline; Stevenson, Mark (2012). "A description of the demographic characteristics of the New Zealand non-commercial horse population with data collected using a generalised random-tessellation stratified sampling design". Preventive Veterinary Medicine. 107 (3–4): 242–252. doi:10.1016/j.prevetmed.2012.05.016. PMID 22766270. Wikidata Q34327514.
- Tsim Christopher Sun; Christopher Riggs; N Cogger; J Wright; J I Al-Alawneh (2018). "Noncatastrophic and catastrophic fractures in racing Thoroughbreds at the Hong Kong Jockey Club". Equine Veterinary Journal. 51 (1): 77–82. doi:10.1111/evj.12953. PMID 29672909. Wikidata Q88409466.
- S E Ridge; C Heuer; N Cogger; A Heck; S Moor; I M Baker; S Vaughan (2010). "Herd management practices and the transmission of Johne's disease within infected dairy herds in Victoria, Australia". Preventive Veterinary Medicine. 95 (3–4): 186–197. doi:10.1016/j.prevetmed.2010.05.001. PMID 20554069. Wikidata Q46821343.
- N J Cave; J P Bridges; N Cogger; R S Farman (2009). "A survey of diseases of working farm dogs in New Zealand". New Zealand Veterinary Journal. 57 (6): 305–312. doi:10.1080/00480169.2009.60926. PMID 19966889. Wikidata Q47267174.
- Hulme, Philip Eric; Beggs, Jacqueline Rae; Binny, Rachelle Naomi; Bray, Jonathan Peter; Naomi Cogger; Manpreet K. Dhami; Finlay, Susanna; French, Nigel Peter; Andrea Grant; Hewitt, Chad; Eirian E. Jones; Phil J. Lester; Peter J. Lockhart (2023). "Emerging advances in biosecurity to underpin human, animal, plant, and ecosystem health". iScience. 26 (9) 107462. doi:10.1016/j.isci.2023.107462. PMID 37636074. Wikidata Q124979014.
