= Harlene Hayne =

New Zealand academic

Harlene Hayne CNZM
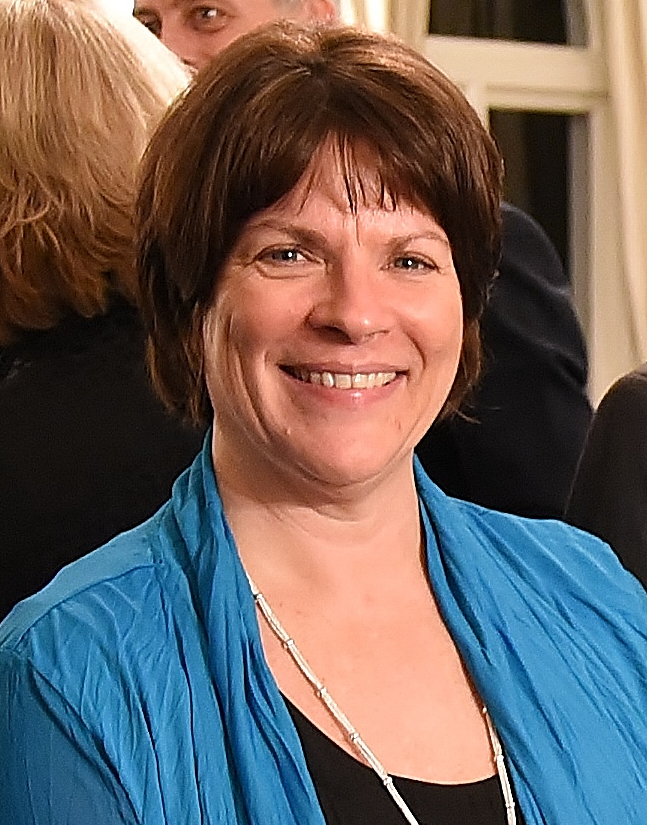
- Hayne in 2016

6th Vice-chancellor at Curtin University
- Incumbent
- Assumed office April 2021
- Chancellor: Andy Crane
- Preceded by: Deborah Terry

8th Vice-chancellor at the University of Otago
- In office 1 August 2011 – March 2021
- Chancellor: John Francis Ward; Royden John Somerville
- Preceded by: David Skegg
- Succeeded by: David Murdoch

Personal details
- Born: Vada Harlene Hayne; 1961/1962 (age 64–65) Oklahoma, U.S.
- Education: Colorado College (BA); Rutgers University (MS, Ph.D.)
- Occupation: Academic administrator, psychologist

Academic background
- Thesis: The effect of multiple reminders on long-term retention in human infants (1988)
- Doctoral advisor: Carolyn Rovee-Collier

Academic work
- Discipline: Psychology
- Institutions: University of Otago; Curtin University

Vada Harlene Hayne CNZM (born 1961 or 1962) is an American-born academic administrator who was the vice-chancellor and a professor of psychology at the University of Otago in New Zealand, before moving to Western Australia to take up the position of vice-chancellor at Curtin University in April 2021.

She was elected a Fellow of the Royal Society of New Zealand in 2002, and is also a fellow of the Association for Psychological Science. She was recipient of the Robert L. Fantz Memorial Award from the American Psychological Foundation in 1997.

She was the first female vice-chancellor of the University of Otago, and served in the role from 2011 to 2021.

== Early life and education ==
Born in Oklahoma and raised in Colorado, Hayne attended Colorado College, where she earned a Bachelor of Arts degree. She continued her education at Rutgers University, completing a MS and PhD while working under the supervision of Carolyn Rovee-Collier. She spent three years as a post-doctoral fellow at Princeton University, and moved to New Zealand in 1992 to join the University of Otago as a lecturer in the psychology department.

== Career ==
She served on the Academic Council of the Royal Society of New Zealand, the Marsden Fund Council, and the New Zealand National Science Panel. She is an associate editor of Psychological Review and of the New Zealand Journal of Psychology.

Hayne is a leading researcher in memory development in infants, children, adolescents and adults and her work has been cited in legal proceedings both nationally and internationally.

During Hayne's tenure as Vice-Chancellor, staff numbers (FTE) increased from 3,749 in 2011 to 4,154 in 2020, her last full year as Vice-Chancellor. Over the same period, student numbers decreased from 19,568 (EFTS) to 18,722, partly attributed to the introduction of an enrolment limitation system aimed at slowing growth and "giving priority to higher calibre students". Hayne prioritised student support and wellbeing and undertook several initiatives to rein in the university's notorious student drinking culture. Māori enrolments increased significantly during her term including in the medical programme. She was close to her students and thanked them on her departure, writing 'My life has been made so much richer by knowing you". The university's operating revenue increased from $592 million to $756 million during her tenure and net assets increased from $1.6 billion to $2.5 billion. Several major capital projects were completed including a refurbished library building and new buildings for music, theatre and performing arts, dentistry, and the Christchurch School of Medicine following significant damage from the Christchurch earthquake.

Hayne's tenure as vice-chancellor was associated with controversy regarding cuts to the university's humanities division. In 2017, she was accused of intimidating behaviour surrounding cuts to 16 full-time equivalent jobs in the division, and in 2018 following the decision to eliminate the entire Art History program. In these cuts she worked closely with then Pro-Vice-Chancellor of Humanities, Tony Ballantyne.

In early October 2020, it was reported that Hayne would be finishing her term as Vice-Chancellor at the University of Otago in 2021 to assume the position of Vice Chancellor at Curtin University in Perth; before completing her second five-year term at Otago University. Her successor as Vice-Chancellor of the University of Otago, Professor David Murdoch, stepped down less than 18 months after being appointed after a period of ill health and was replaced by The Hon Grant Robertson.

In May 2025, Professor Hayne was unanimously appointed to a second 5-year term at Curtin University with the university's Chancellor noting that 'Curtin has a bold vision and an outstanding leader at the helm'.

== Recognition ==
In the 2009 New Year Honours, she was appointed an Officer of the New Zealand Order of Merit for services to scientific and medical research.

In 2017, Hayne was selected as one of the Royal Society Te Apārangi's "150 women in 150 words", celebrating the contributions of women to knowledge in New Zealand. In 2021, she was conferred with an honorary Doctor of Laws degree by the University of Otago.

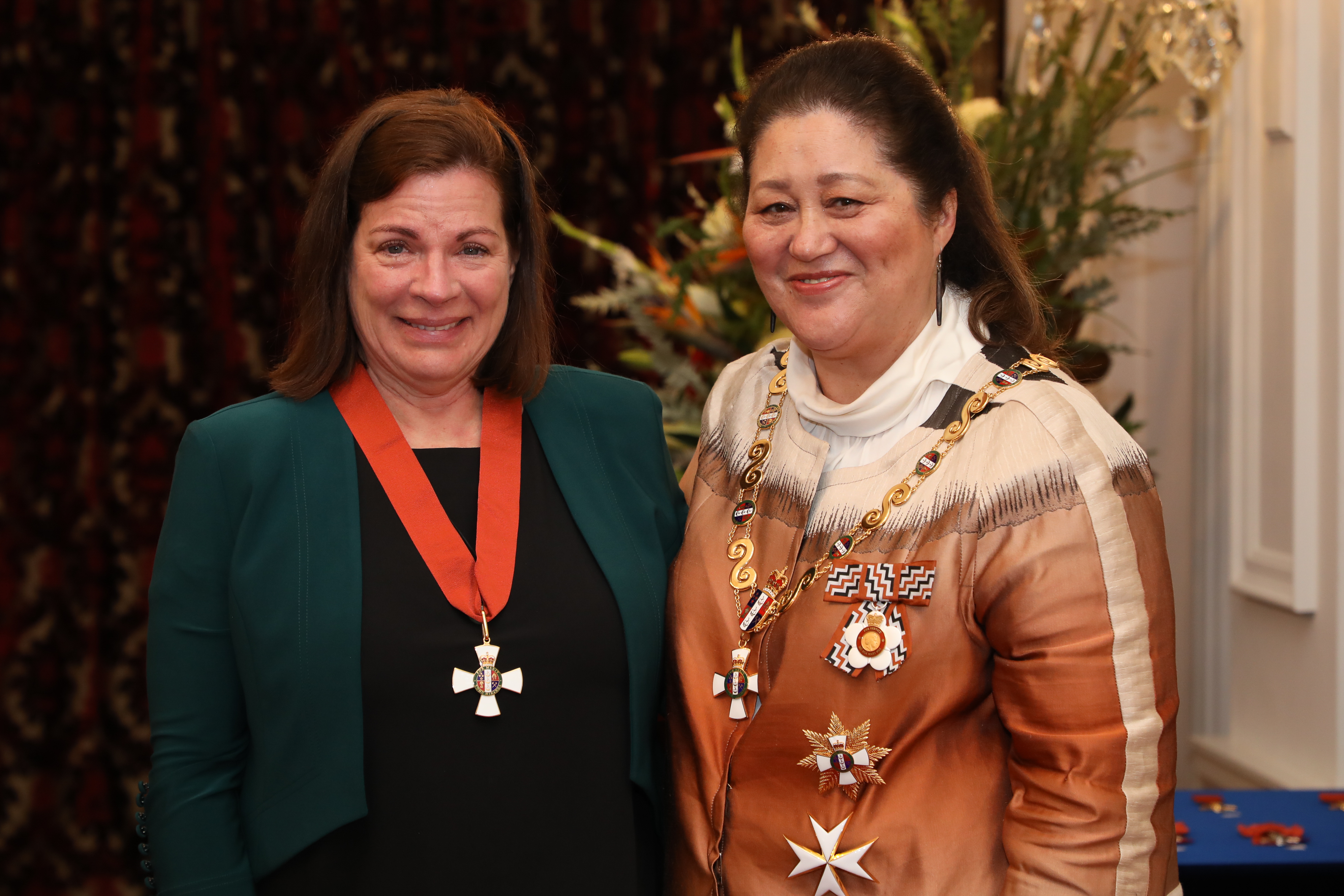
Hayne (left), after her investiture as a Companion of the New Zealand Order of Merit by the governor-general, Dame Cindy Kiro, at Government House, Wellington, on 4 May 2022

In the 2022 New Year Honours, Hayne was promoted to Companion of the New Zealand Order of Merit, for services to health and wellbeing.

== Selected works ==
- Hayne, Harlene (1990). "The effect of multiple reminders on long-term retention in human infants". Developmental Psychobiology. 23 (6): 453–477. doi:10.1002/dev.420230603. PMID 2272404.
- Hayne, Harlene (2004). "Infant memory development: Implications for childhood amnesia". Developmental Review. 24: 33–73. doi:10.1016/j.dr.2003.09.007.
- Hayne, Harlene; Boniface, Joanne; Barr, Rachel (2000). "The development of declarative memory in human infants: Age-related changes in deferred imitation". Behavioral Neuroscience. 114 (1): 77–83. doi:10.1037/0735-7044.114.1.77. PMID 10718263. S2CID 21503131.
- Hayne, Harlene; Herbert, Jane; Simcock, Gabrielle (2003). "Imitation from television by 24- and 30-month-olds". Developmental Science. 6 (3): 254–261. doi:10.1111/1467-7687.00281.
- Hayne, Harlene; Rovee-Collier, Carolyn; Perris, Eve E. (1987). "Categorization and Memory Retrieval by Three-Month-Olds". Child Development. 58 (3): 750–767. doi:10.2307/1130212. JSTOR 1130212. PMID 3608647.
- Rovee-Collier, Carolyn K.; Hayne, Harlene; Colombo, Michael (2000). The Development of Implicit and Explicit Memory. Advances in Consciousness Research. Vol. 24. doi:10.1075/aicr.24. ISBN 978-90-272-5144-2. S2CID 142629159.
