= Eirian =

Eirian is a name of Welsh origin meaning "beautiful, bright" or "silver." Notable people with this name include:

== Given name ==
- Eirian Jones, New Zealand phytopathologist
- Eirian Llwyd (1951–2014), Welsh artist
- Eirian Smith (born 1998), American acrobatic gymnast
- Eirian Williams (born 1955), Welsh snooker referee

== Middle name ==
- James Eirian Davies (1918–1998), Welsh poet
- Jennie Eirian Davies (1925–1982), Welsh politician
- Sian Eirian Rees Davies (born 1981), Welsh writer
