= European Working Group for Legionella Infections =

Disease research group, based in London

The European Working Group for Legionella Infections (EWGLI) was formed in 1986. Its members are scientists with an interest in improving knowledge and information on the epidemiological and microbiological (clinical and environmental) aspects of legionnaires' disease. This is achieved through international surveillance of the disease, as well as developments in diagnosis, management and treatment methods.

EWGLI is based at the Health Protection Agency - Centre for Infections, Department of Respiratory Diseases (Legionella Section) in Colindale, north London, England.

== External quality assessment schemes ==
External Quality Assessment (EQA) schemes are an important component in the operation of EWGLI. The following schemes are available:

- Typing and Identification Schemes
- Urinary Antigen Scheme
- Water Scheme
- Sequencing Proficiency Panels

== See also ==
- Microbiology
- Environmental microbiology
- Legionella
- Legionellosis
- Copper-silver ionization
