= Pontiac fever =

Respiratory disease caused by Legionella bacteria

- Specialty: Infectious diseases

Pontiac fever is an acute, nonfatal respiratory disease caused by various species of Gram-negative bacteria in the genus Legionella. It causes a mild upper respiratory infection that resembles acute influenza. Pontiac fever resolves spontaneously and often goes undiagnosed. Both Pontiac fever and the more severe Legionnaires' disease may be caused by the same bacterium, but Pontiac fever does not include pneumonia.

== Signs and symptoms ==
Pontiac fever causes flu-like symptoms including fever, dry cough, shortness of breath, headaches, and muscle aches.

== Cause ==
Species of Legionella known to cause Pontiac fever include Legionella pneumophila, Legionella longbeachae, Legionella feeleii, Legionella micdadei, and Legionella anisa. Sources of the causative agents are aquatic systems and potting soil. The first outbreak caused by inhalation of aerosolized potting soil was discovered in New Zealand in January 2007. A total of 10 workers at a nursery came down with Pontiac fever. It was the first identification of L. longbeachae. Pontiac fever does not spread from person to person. It is acquired through aerosolization of water droplets or potting soil containing Legionella bacteria.

== Epidemiology ==
Pontiac fever is known to have a short incubation period of 1 to 3 days. No fatalities have been reported and cases resolve spontaneously without treatment. It is often not reported. Age, gender, and smoking do not seem to be risk factors. Pontiac fever seems to affect young people in the age medians of 29 to 32. Pathogenesis of the Pontiac fever is poorly known.

== History ==
Pontiac fever was named after the city of Pontiac, Michigan, where the first case was recognized. In 1968, several workers at the county's department of health came down with a fever and mild flu symptoms, but not pneumonia. After the 1976 Legionnaires' outbreak in Philadelphia, the Michigan health department re-examined blood samples and discovered the workers had been infected with the newly identified Legionella pneumophila. An outbreak caused by Legionella micdadei in early 1988 in the UK became known as Lochgoilhead fever. Since that time, other species of Legionella that cause Pontiac fever have been identified, most notably in New Zealand, in 2007 where Legionella longbeachae was discovered. The New Zealand outbreak also marked the first time Pontiac fever had been traced to potting soil.
