= Deborah Terry =

Australian psychology scholar and academic administrator

Debbie Terry AC FASSA

11th Vice Chancellor and President of the University of Queensland
- Incumbent
- Assumed office August 2020
- Chancellor: Peter Varghese
- Preceded by: Peter Høj

5th Vice Chancellor and President of Curtin University
- In office February 2014 – July 2020
- Chancellor: Colin Beckett; Andy Crane
- Preceded by: Jeanette Hacket
- Succeeded by: Harlene Hayne

Personal details
- Education: Australian National University (BA, MA, PhD)

Academic background
- Thesis: Stress, Coping, and Adaptation in Married Couples (1988)
- Doctoral advisor: W. A. Scott

Academic work
- Discipline: Psychology
- Institutions: University of Queensland; Curtin University

Deborah Jane "Debbie" Terry AC FASSA is an Australian university executive, and psychology scholar.

She is currently the Vice-Chancellor and President of The University of Queensland. Professor Terry is also currently the Chair of Universities Australia, the peak body representing Australia's higher education sector.

== Early life and education ==
Terry was born in Western Australia but completed her secondary education at Canberra Girls Grammar School. She then studied at the Australian National University, graduating with a BA and then a PhD in 1989.

== Career ==
Terry moved to Brisbane where she was employed in the School of Psychology at The University of Queensland in 1990. In 2000 she was promoted to head of school and 2008 saw her become deputy vice-chancellor of the university.

In February 2014, Terry was appointed Vice-Chancellor and President of Curtin University. In August 2020, she returned to The University of Queensland and became the Vice-Chancellor and President. Her annual salary at the university is $1,213,402.

In addition to her university role, Terry is a past president of the Society for Australasian Social Psychology. She has also been on the editorial board of the British Journal of Psychology and the European Journal of Social Psychology. In May 2019 Terry began a two-year term as Chair of Universities Australia, having been a member of its board since 2015. In March 2021 she addressed the National Press Club.

== Awards and recognition ==
Terry was appointed Fellow of the Academy of the Social Sciences in Australia in 2003. She was awarded the Officer of the Order of Australia (AO) in the 2015 Queen's Birthday Honours for "distinguished service to education in the tertiary sector through senior administrative roles, as an academic and researcher in the field of psychology, and as a mentor". She was promoted to Companion of the Order of Australia (AC) in the 2024 Australia Day Honours for "eminent service to tertiary education as an institutional leader and academic, to the strengthening of higher education through collaboration and innovation, and to the community". She is also a Fellow of the Australian Psychology Society.

== Selected publications ==
- Hogg, Michael A.; Terry, Deborah J.; White, Katherine M. (December 1995). "A Tale of Two Theories: A Critical Comparison of Identity Theory with Social Identity Theory". Social Psychology Quarterly. 58 (4): 255. doi:10.2307/2787127. JSTOR 2787127.
- Terry, Deborah J.; Hogg, Michael A. (August 1996). "Group Norms and the Attitude-Behavior Relationship: A Role for Group Identification". Personality and Social Psychology Bulletin. 22 (8): 776–793. doi:10.1177/0146167296228002. ISSN 0146-1672. S2CID 145426706.
- Terry, Deborah J.; Hogg, Michael A.; White, Katherine M. (1999). "The theory of planned behaviour: Self-identity, social identity and group norms" (PDF). British Journal of Social Psychology. 38 (3): 225–244. doi:10.1348/014466699164149. PMID 10520477.
- Hogg, Michael A.; Terry, Deborah J. (January 2000). "Social Identity and Self-Categorization Processes in Organizational Contexts". Academy of Management Review. 25 (1): 121–140. doi:10.5465/amr.2000.2791606. ISSN 0363-7425.
- Amiot, Catherine E.; Terry, Deborah J.; Jimmieson, Nerina L.; Callan, Victor J. (August 2006). "A Longitudinal Investigation of Coping Processes During a Merger: Implications for Job Satisfaction and Organizational Identification". Journal of Management. 32 (4): 552–574. doi:10.1177/0149206306287542. ISSN 0149-2063. S2CID 142968251.
