= Legionella anisa =

Scientific classification
- Domain: Bacteria
- Kingdom: Pseudomonadati
- Phylum: Pseudomonadota
- Class: Gammaproteobacteria
- Order: Legionellales
- Family: Legionellaceae
- Genus: Legionella
- Species: L. anisa

Binomial name
- Legionella anisa Gorman et al. 1985, sp. nov.

Species of bacterium

Legionella anisa is a Gram-negative bacterium, one of more than 40 species in the family Legionellaceae. After Legionella pneumophila, this species has been isolated most frequently from water samples. This species is also one of the several pathogenic forms of Legionella having been associated with rare clinical cases of illness including Pontiac fever and Legionnaires' disease.

== History ==
This species was first isolated from water during a nosocomial outbreak in the United States between March 1980 and June 1981. The type strain of L. anisa is WA-316-C3 (ATCC 35292).

The first reported clinical detection was in 1986, with a female patient in Victoria, Australia, who presented with pneumonia. Similar to other Legionella species, person-to-person transmission has not been documented.

== Structure ==
Like other Legionella species, L. anisa is a thin, aerobic, pleomorphic, flagellated, non-spore-forming, Gram-negative bacterium. A distinguishing characteristic is the ability of colonies to exhibit blue-white autofluorescence when viewed under ultraviolet light. Thus, L. anisa, along with several other species of Legionella, is sometimes referred to as "blue-white" Legionella.

== Detection ==
Legionella anisa is traditionally detected using the same culture methods as described for Legionella. However, some research suggests L. anisa may require a co-culture method that accounts for the close relationship with amoebae. When present in a sample but still contained within an amoeba host, the plating method may return false-negative results. Adjusting currently accepted laboratory analysis may be required to better understand the true clinical and environmental prevalence of this particular species.

Genome-based analytical techniques may prove especially useful for L. anisa, as a study of isolates from various locations in France suggest that the genomic variation is much more limited and homogenous than other Legionella species. In addition, such techniques greatly reduce the time required to obtain results.

== Symptoms ==
Infections may be asymptomatic, and are strongly associated with the respiratory system. Early symptoms can include fever, chills, headache, shortness of breath, cough, muscle aches and pain, fatigue, loss of appetite, sputum production with presence of blood, nausea, and irritation or inflammation of the nose, throat, or lungs.

Most people who breathe in the bacteria do not become ill. The risk of disease is increased with age, smoking, and in people with weakened immune systems. A multinational study found that less than 3% of reported Legionella infections were due to L. anisa.
