= Eloise Jillings =

Veterinary professor in New Zealand

Academic background
- Education: Massey University, Massey University, Massey University
- Theses: Assessment of the effect of blood contamination on the urinary protein to creatinine ratio in the dog (2007); Rapua te mea ngaro. Exploring the access of Māori to Veterinary Education in Aotearoa New Zealand (2022)
- Doctoral advisor: Naomi Cogger, Timothy J Parkinson, Dianne H Gardner, Kent Hecker, Elana Curtis
- Other advisor: Keith Gordon Thompson

Eloise Katherine Puia Jillings is a New Zealand academic, and is a full professor at Massey University, specialising in clinical pathology and veterinary education.

== Early life and education ==
Jillings is of Māori and Canadian descent, and affiliates to Ngāti Mārū. Her family moved to Canada when she was seven, and she returned to New Zealand at age 19 to study as a veterinarian.

== Academic career ==
Jillings completed a Master of Veterinary Studies at Massey University in 2007, with a thesis on creatinine in dogs. Jillings then joined the faculty of the university, rising to full professor in 2023. Jillings completed a PhD titled Rapua te mea ngaro. Exploring the access of Māori to Veterinary Education in Aotearoa New Zealand at Massey University in 2022.

Jillings teaches clinical pathology, and also has interests in student selection processes and Indigenous education. While she was Associate Dean of Admissions and Students at Massey, in 2012, Jillings was in charge of the review of admissions procedures, that led to a change from a completely academic focus to also considering non-academic criteria such as interpersonal skills. While this was portrayed in some coverage as a lowering of standards, Jillings felt it was unfair to continue to admit students based only on academic grades when some parts of their course would lead to them being assessed on different criteria.

With colleague Kate Hill, Jillings fundraised for and set up a bursary in honour of 16-year old Mustafa Hamza, who was killed in the mosque shootings in Christchurch. Hamza had ambitions to be a vet, and the bursary is awarded in his name to "promote the importance of inclusivity in the veterinary profession".

Jillings is the New Zealand representative on the American Association of Veterinary Medical Colleges' Council on International Veterinary Medical Education.

== Selected works ==
- Eloise Katherine Puia Jillings; Emma Gordon (2022). "Teaching tomorrow's great veterinarians". Journal of the American Veterinary Medical Association. 260 (14): 1779. doi:10.2460/javma.22.09.0414. Wikidata Q124540599.
- Gartrell BD; Jillings E; Adlington BA; Mack H; Nelson NJ (2006). "Health screening for a translocation of captive-reared tuatara (Sphenodon punctatus) to an island refuge". New Zealand Veterinary Journal. 54 (6): 344–349. doi:10.1080/00480169.2006.36722. PMID 17151736. Wikidata Q41451044.
- Eloise Katherine Puia Jillings; Squires, Richard; Sara Azarpeykan; Nicolas Lopez-Villalobos (2019). "Does blood contamination of urine compromise interpretation of the urine protein to creatinine ratio in dogs?". New Zealand Veterinary Journal. 67 (2): 74–78. doi:10.1080/00480169.2018.1556129. PMID 30517829. Wikidata Q90282075.
- EKP Jillings; E Curtis; Gardner, Dianne; TJ Parkinson; KG Hecker; N Cogger (2021). "Widening access to veterinary education: descriptive analysis of ethnicity, societal representation and educational background of applicants to veterinary education in Aotearoa New Zealand". New Zealand Veterinary Journal. 69 (3): 147–157. doi:10.1080/00480169.2021.1885519. PMID 33754960. Wikidata Q124540112.
