= Copper–silver ionization =

Infection control process

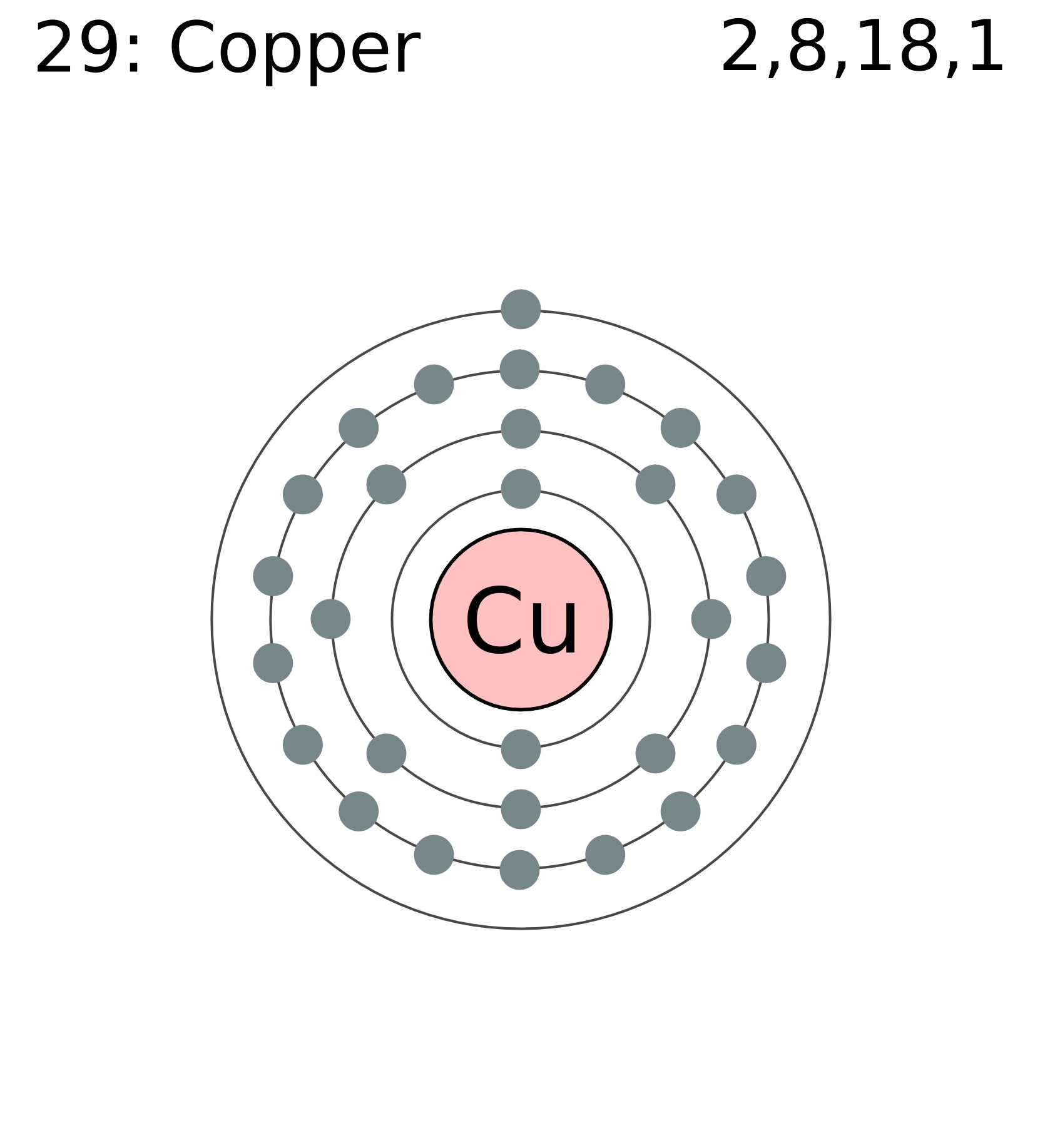
Copper electron shell

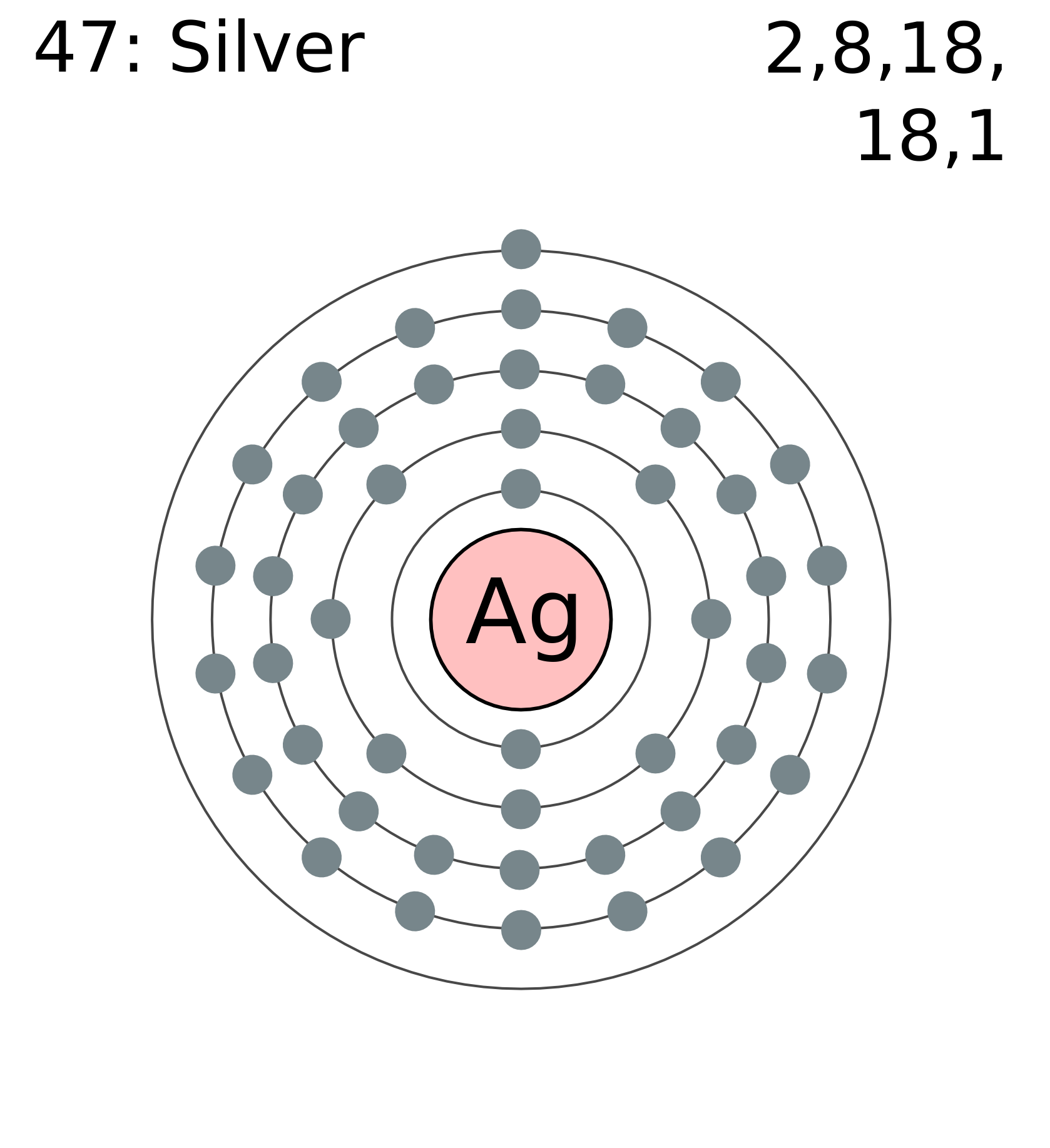
Silver electron shell

Copper–silver ionization is a disinfection process, primarily used to control Legionella, the bacteria responsible for Legionnaires' disease. There is strong evidence that treating water supplies in hospitals with this technique decreases the risk.

== Effectiveness ==
Ionization can be an effective process to control Legionella in potable water distribution systems found in health facilities, hotels, nursing homes, and large buildings. In 2003, ionization became the first such hospital disinfection process to have fulfilled a proposed four-step modality evaluation; by then it had been adopted by over 100 hospitals. Additional studies indicate ionization is superior to thermal eradication.

A 2011 review found copper–silver ionization to be the only Legionella control technology which has been validated through a proposed four-step modality evaluation (need reference or description of "modality" in this context since it does not apply in all situations).

=== Guidelines ===
Copper–silver ionization technology is recognized by the World Health Organization (WHO), the U.S. Environmental Protection Agency (EPA) to control Legionella within potable water distribution networks found in hospitals, hotels and other large type facilities. The level of ions generated has been reported to be usually below EPA Safe Water Drinking Act Lead and Copper Rule AL for copper. The AL for copper in potable water is 1.3 ppm (Cu) and the SCL for silver is 0.1 ppm (Ag) (which is the same as 100 ppb).

It is important to collect and handle samples correctly in order to get accurate results. Suboptimal timing of specimen shipment for testing at reference laboratories may contribute to silver concentration above recommendations. Industry leaders who manufacture copper–silver ionization technology recommend a copper concentration of 0.2 to 0.8 ppm and a silver concentration of 10 to 80 ppb, which are compliant with EPA drinking water standards.

==== Europe ====
The British Health and Safety Commission regulates U.K. ionization, advising regular system monitoring to ensure ions reach all water circuits. Also, copper in drinking water is limited to 2 ppm (mg/L) by the European Community whereas Legionella control only requires 0.2 to 0.8 ppm in concentration...well below the permissible limits. Headquarters (ECH) in Brussels, Belgium, and silver is not prescribed by the ECH.

The EU limits copper to 1.0 ppm—lower than the USA copper AL of 1.3 ppm. The EU does not have any guidelines for ionic silver concentrations—the US SCL is 0.1 ppm (100 ppb).

In February 2012, the European Commission issued a non-inclusion decision regarding the use of copper as a biocide in Europe. This decision was based on a failure of industry to supply the commission with required information regarding copper and was not based on health or efficacy concerns. In response to this decision, five member states—Spain, the UK, Norway, Poland, and the Netherlands—have applied to the commission to allow for the continued use of copper as a biocide in their respective nations.

In addition, the UK authority, the HSE, has issued a statement stating that the derogation application for the UK has been informally granted. Industry has responded by forming a Taskforce to ensure full and long term compliance with the regulatory issues facing copper in the EU.

== Process ==
Copper–silver ionization disperses positively charged copper and silver ions into the water system. The ions bond electrostatically with negative sites on bacterial cell walls and denature proteins. Over the long term, the presence of copper and silver ions destroy biofilms and slimes that can harbor Legionella, the bacteria responsible for Legionnaires' disease (legionellosis). It can take 30 to 45 days for the copper and silver ions to penetrate a biofilm.

Flow cells (part of the ionization unit) should be cleaned periodically to maintain the system. In a hospital that is not defined as a public water system, this task may be delegated to the facility's utility engineers. If a hospital is defined as a public water system, the maintenance personnel may be required to have a State-issued water treatment license. In the US, different states have specific regulations for hospitals and drinking water treatment that should be reviewed before going forward with installation of copper–silver ionization.

Forensic scientist Randy Fornshell of the Sedgwick County Regional Forensic Science Center explains that copper–silver ionization is a modern implementation of the ancient Greek practice of reducing bacteria in wine vessels by lining them with silver, and controlling algae and fungi with copper. Fornshell notes that copper–silver ionization has been effective in swimming pools (it is an alternative to chlorine) and is becoming adopted by larger municipalities.

Replacing chlorination with copper–silver ionization to keep water safe was one response of Frederick Memorial Hospital, Frederick, Maryland, to new requirements in the 2001 Guidelines for Design and Construction of Hospital and Healthcare Facilities, issued by the American Institute of Architects. Ionization is in many cases installed because more convenient and cost-effective than other approaches.

=== Regulations ===
It is possible to operate copper–silver ionization without exceeding the copper Action Level (AL) and silver secondary maximum contaminant levels (SMCLs) set by the U.S. Environmental Protection Agency in the Safe Water Drinking Act's Lead and Copper Rule (Title 40, Code of Federal Regulations, 40 CFR) in Part 141, Subpart I; and 40 CFR Part 143, respectively.

== See also ==
- Occupational hygiene
