= Legionella feeleii =

Scientific classification
- Domain: Bacteria
- Kingdom: Pseudomonadati
- Phylum: Pseudomonadota
- Class: Gammaproteobacteria
- Order: Legionellales
- Family: Legionellaceae
- Genus: Legionella
- Species: L. feeleii

Binomial name
- Legionella feeleii Herwaldt et al. 1984

Type strain
- ATCC 35072, CCUG 16417, CIP 103877, DSM 17645, Goorman WO-44C, NCTC 12022, WO-44C

Species of bacterium

Legionella feeleii is a Gram-negative, rod-shaped bacterium from the genus Legionella which was isolated from an automobile plant and which was held responsible for causing Pontiac fever in 317 workers. The organism did not grow on blood agar, required L-cysteine, and showed significant quantities of branched-chain fatty acids. More recently, an unusual, extrapulmonary case was described in a 66-year-old woman admitted to Hopital Nord, Marseille, France because of a complicated cellulitis and an abscess on her right leg following a suspected insect or spider bite.

In 2024 a few dozens people have been infected by Legionella feeleii during a music party/live dj set in Bologna, Italy in a building that was filled with water vapor for the purposes of the party itself. According to different sources from around 60 to more than 100 people had the typical Pontiac Fever symptoms.
