= Legionnaires' disease =

Form of atypical pneumonia

- Other names: Legionellosis, legion fever
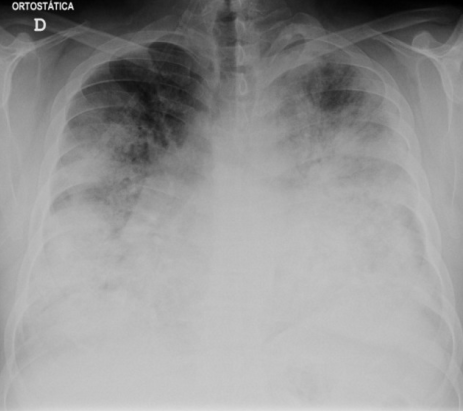
- Chest X-ray of a severe case of legionellosis upon admission to the emergency department
- Specialty: Infectious disease, pulmonology
- Symptoms: Cough, shortness of breath, fever, muscle pains, headaches
- Usual onset: 2–10 days after exposure
- Causes: Bacteria of the Legionella type (spread by contaminated mist)
- Risk factors: Older age, history of smoking, chronic lung disease, staying in a hotel, spa or a hospital, poor immune function
- Diagnostic method: Urinary antigen test, sputum culture
- Prevention: Good maintenance of water systems
- Treatment: Antibiotics
- Prognosis: 10% risk of death
- Frequency: ~13,000 severe cases a year (US)

Legionnaires' disease is a form of atypical pneumonia caused by any species of Legionella bacteria, quite often Legionella pneumophila. Signs and symptoms include cough, shortness of breath, high fever, muscle pains, and headaches. Nausea, vomiting, and diarrhea may also occur. This often begins 2–10 days after exposure.

A legionellosis is any disease caused by Legionella, including Legionnaires' disease (a pneumonia) and Pontiac fever (a related upper respiratory tract infection), but Legionnaires' disease is the most common, so mentions of legionellosis often refer to Legionnaires' disease.

Legionella is found naturally in fresh water. It can contaminate hot water tanks, hot tubs, and cooling towers of large air conditioners. Typically, it is spread by breathing in mist that contains Legionella, and can also occur when contaminated water is aspirated. It typically does not spread directly between people, and most people who are exposed do not become infected. Risk factors for infection include older age, a history of smoking, chronic lung disease, and poor immune function. Those with severe pneumonia and those with pneumonia and a recent travel history should be tested for the disease. Diagnosis is by a urinary antigen test and sputum culture.

No vaccine is available. Prevention depends on good maintenance of water systems. Treatment of Legionnaires' disease is commonly conducted with antibiotics. Recommended agents include the fluoroquinolones levofloxacin and moxifloxacin, and the macrolide azithromycin. Hospitalization is often required. The fatality rate is around 10% for previously healthy people, but up to 25% in those with underlying conditions.

The numbers of cases that occur globally is not known. Legionnaires' disease is the cause of an estimated 2–9% of pneumonia cases that are acquired outside of a hospital. An estimated 8,000 to 18,000 cases a year in the United States require hospitalization. Outbreaks of disease account for a minority of cases. While it can occur any time of the year, it is more common in the summer and autumn. The disease is named after the outbreak where it was first identified, at a 1976 American Legion convention in Philadelphia.

== Signs and symptoms ==
The length of time between exposure to the bacteria and the appearance of symptoms (incubation period) is generally 2–10 days, but more rarely can extend to as long as 20 days. For the general population, among those exposed, between 0.1 and 5.0% develop the disease, while among those in hospital, between 0.4 and 14% develop the disease.

Those with Legionnaires' disease usually have fever, chills, and a cough, which may be dry or may produce sputum. Almost all experience fever, while around half have cough with sputum, and one-third cough up blood or bloody sputum. Some also have muscle aches, headache, tiredness, loss of appetite, loss of coordination (ataxia), chest pain, or diarrhea and vomiting. Up to half of those with Legionnaires' disease have gastrointestinal symptoms, and almost half have neurological symptoms, including confusion and impaired cognition. "Relative bradycardia" may also be present, which is low to normal heart rate despite the presence of a fever.

Laboratory tests may show that kidney functions, liver functions, and electrolyte levels are abnormal, which may include low sodium in the blood. Chest X-rays often show pneumonia with consolidation in the lower portion of both lungs. Distinguishing Legionnaires' disease from other types of pneumonia by symptoms or radiologic findings alone is difficult; other tests are required for definitive diagnosis.

People with Pontiac fever, a much milder illness caused by the same bacterial genus, experience fever and muscle aches without pneumonia. They generally recover in 2–5 days without treatment. For Pontiac fever, the time between exposure and symptoms is generally a few hours to two days.

== Cause ==
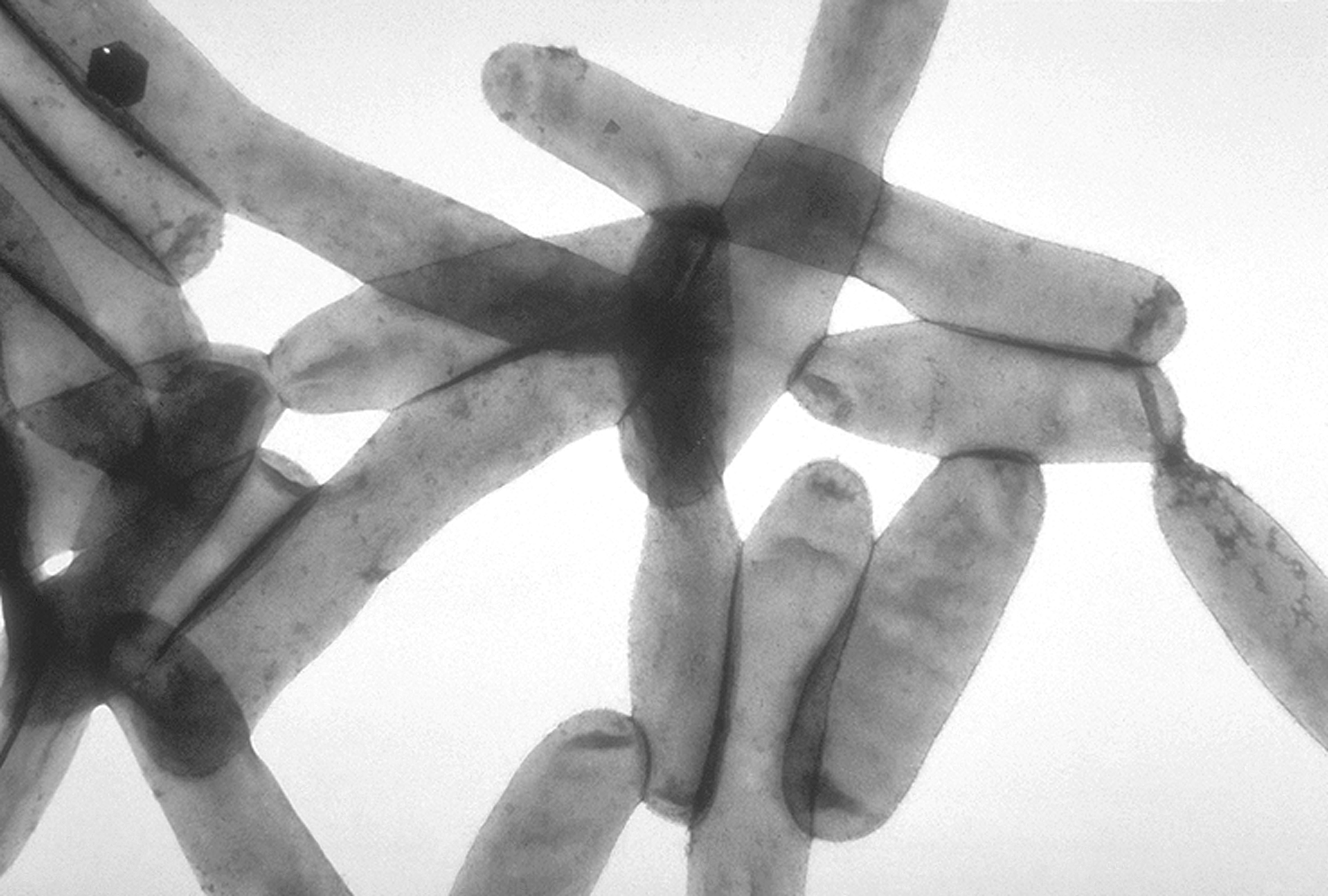
Transmission electron microscopy image of L. pneumophila, responsible for over 90% of Legionnaires' disease cases

Over 90% of cases of Legionnaires' disease are caused by Legionella pneumophila. Other types include L. longbeachae, L. feeleii, L. micdadei, and L. anisa.

=== Transmission ===
Legionnaires' disease is usually spread by the breathing in of aerosolized water or soil contaminated with the Legionella bacteria. Experts have stated that Legionnaires' disease is not transmitted from person to person. In 2014, one case of possible spread from someone sick to the caregiver occurred. Rarely, it has been transmitted by direct contact between contaminated water and surgical wounds. The bacteria grow best at warm temperatures and thrive at water temperatures between 25 and 45 °C (77 and 113 °F), with an optimum temperature of 35 °C (95 °F). Temperatures above 60 °C (140 °F) kill the bacteria. Sources where temperatures allow the bacteria to thrive include hot water tanks, cooling towers, and evaporative condensers of large air conditioning systems, such as those commonly found in hotels and large office buildings. Before 1988, energy conservation programs from the late 1970s and early 1980s still mandated a maximum hot water generation, storage, and distribution temperature of 110 °F (43 °C), unknowingly Legionella bacteria's ideal breeding temperature. To minimize risks of bacterial growth, the American Society of Heating, Refrigerating and Air-Conditioning Engineers' 1988 ASHRAE Standard 188 and subsequent ASHRAE Guideline 12-2000 increased recommended hot water generation and storage temperatures to 135–140 °F (57–60 °C) with minimum distribution temperatures of 124 °F (51 °C).

Though the first known outbreak was in Philadelphia, cases of legionellosis have occurred throughout the world.

=== Reservoirs ===
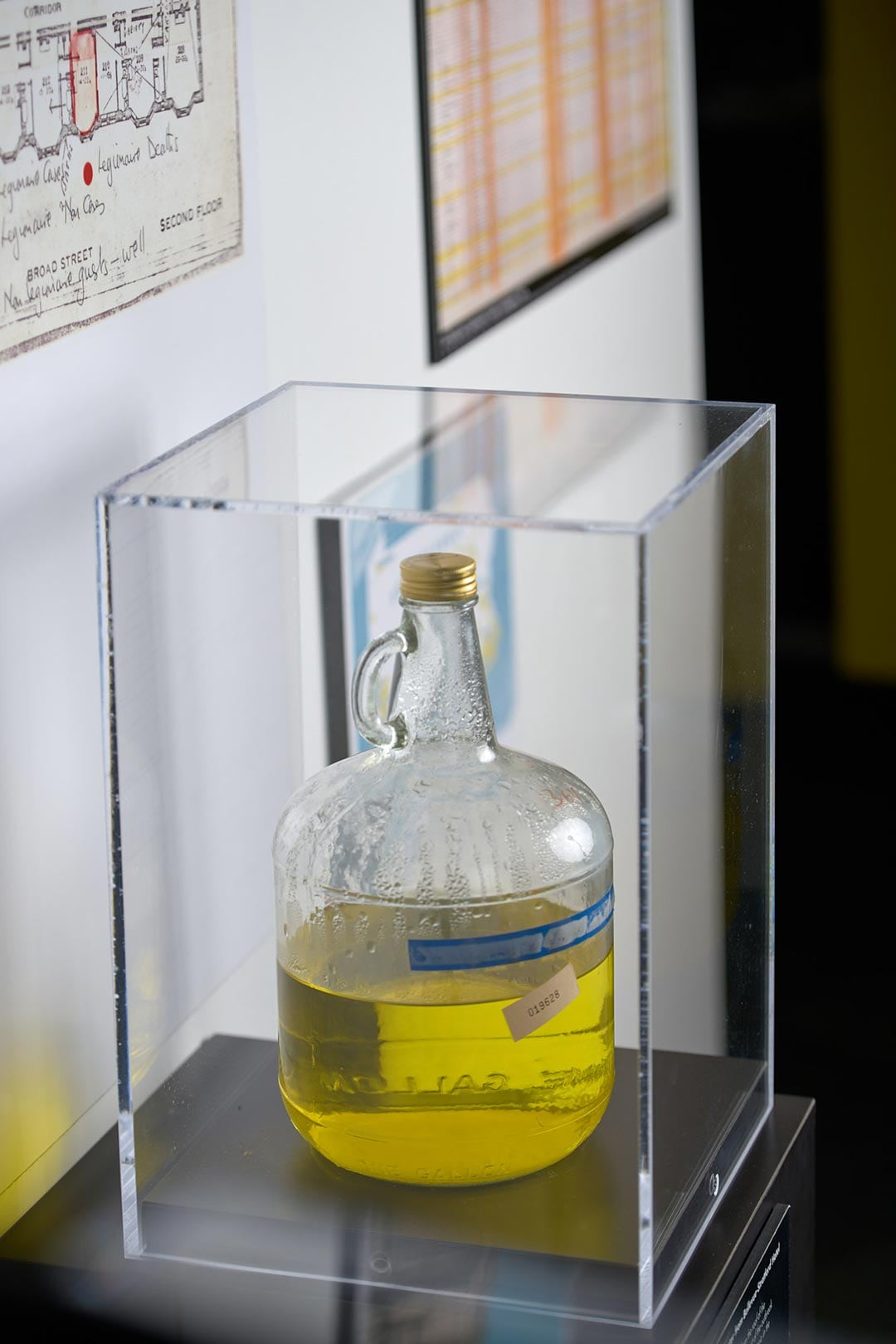
A jug filled with chiller water taken from the Bellevue-Stratford Hotel's cooling system during the 1976 outbreak investigation on display at the David J. Sencer CDC Museum

L. pneumophila thrives in aquatic systems, where it is established within amoebae in a symbiotic relationship. Legionella bacteria survive in water as intracellular parasites of water-dwelling protozoa, such as amoebae. Amoebae are often part of biofilms, and once Legionella and infected amoebae are protected within a biofilm, they are particularly difficult to destroy.

In the built environment, central air conditioning systems in office buildings, hotels, and hospitals are sources of contaminated water. Other places the bacteria can dwell include cooling towers used in industrial cooling systems, evaporative coolers, nebulizers, humidifiers, whirlpool spas, hot water systems, showers, windshield washers, fountains, room-air humidifiers, ice-making machines, and misting systems typically found in grocery-store produce sections.

The bacteria may also be transmitted from contaminated aerosols generated in hot tubs if the disinfection and maintenance programs are not followed rigorously. Freshwater ponds, creeks, and ornamental fountains are potential sources of Legionella. The disease is particularly associated with hotels, fountains, cruise ships, and hospitals with complex potable water systems and cooling systems. Respiratory-care devices such as humidifiers and nebulizers used with contaminated tap water may contain Legionella species, so using sterile water is very important. Other sources include exposure to potting mix and compost.

== Mechanism ==
Legionella species enter the lungs either by aspiration of contaminated water or inhalation of aerosolized contaminated water or soil. In the lung, the bacteria are consumed by macrophages, a type of white blood cell, inside of which the Legionella bacteria multiply, causing the death of the macrophage. Once the macrophage dies, the bacteria are released from the dead cell to infect other macrophages. Virulent strains of Legionella kill macrophages by blocking the fusion of phagosomes with lysosomes inside the host cell; normally, bacteria are contained inside the phagosome, which merges with a lysosome, allowing enzymes and other chemicals to break down the invading bacteria.

== Diagnosis ==
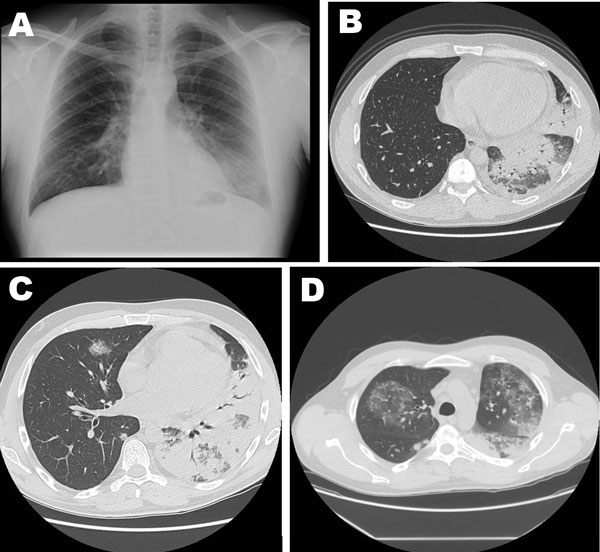
Various stages of the disease: Chest radiograph (A) and high-resolution computed tomography (B) at hospital admission, repeat high-resolution computerized tomography of the chest a week after hospital admission (C, D), shown in a 42-year-old male with severe pneumonia caused by L. pneumophila serogroup 11a

People of any age may develop Legionnaires' disease, but the illness most often affects middle-aged and older people, particularly those who smoke cigarettes or have chronic lung disease. Immunocompromised people are also at higher risk. Pontiac fever most commonly occurs in those who are otherwise healthy.

The most useful diagnostic tests detect the bacteria in coughed-up mucus, find Legionella antigens in urine samples, or allow comparison of Legionella antibody levels in two blood samples taken 3–6 weeks apart. A urine antigen test is simple, quick, and very reliable, but only detects L. pneumophila serogroup 1, which accounts for 70% of disease caused by L. pneumophila, which means use of the urine antigen test alone may miss as many as 30% of cases. This test was developed by Richard Kohler in 1982. When dealing with L. pneumophila serogroup 1, the urine antigen test is useful for early detection of Legionnaire's disease and initiation of treatment, and has been helpful in early detection of outbreaks. However, it does not identify the specific subtypes, so it cannot be used to match the person with the environmental source of infection. The Legionella bacteria can be cultured from sputum or other respiratory samples. Legionella spp. stain poorly with Gram stain, stain positive with silver, and are cultured on charcoal yeast extract with iron and cysteine (CYE agar).

A significant under-reporting problem occurs with legionellosis. Even in countries with effective health services and readily available diagnostic testing, about 90% of cases of Legionnaires' disease are missed. This is partly due to the disease being a relatively rare form of pneumonia, which many clinicians may not have encountered before, thus may misdiagnose. A further issue is that people with legionellosis can present with a wide range of symptoms, some of which (such as diarrhea) may distract clinicians from making a correct diagnosis.

== Prevention ==
Although the risk of Legionnaires' disease being spread by large-scale water systems cannot be eliminated, it can be greatly reduced by writing and enforcing a highly detailed, systematic water safety plan appropriate for the specific facility involved (office building, hospital, hotel, spa, cruise ship, etc.) Some of the elements that such a plan may include are:

- Keep water temperature either below or above the 20–55 °C (68–131 °F) range in which the Legionella bacterium thrives.
- Prevent stagnation, for example, by removing from a network of pipes any sections that have no outlet (dead ends). Where stagnation is unavoidable, as when a wing of a hotel is closed for the off-season, remedial measures are recommended, e.g., maintaining elevated temperatures throughout the hot-water distribution system and periodic disinfection or permanent chlorination of cold-water systems.
- Prevention of biofilms is crucial because once established they become more difficult to remove from piping systems. The likelihood of formation is increased by pipe scale and corrosion; warm water temperatures; stagnation and the quantity of nutrients that enter the system.
- Periodically disinfect the system, by high heat or a chemical biocide, and use chlorination where appropriate. Monochloramine is likely more effective than free chlorine (sodium hypochlorite), being more resistant with residuals likely to persist to the point of delivery. Monochloramine is also more likely to penetrate legionella biofilms. Treatment of water with copper-silver ionization or ultraviolet light may also be effective.
- System design (or renovation) can reduce the production of aerosols and reduce human exposure to them, by directing them well away from building air intakes; the CDC advises locating cooling towers at least 25 ft (7.6 m) from building air intakes so that the tower's drift plume is not drawn into a ventilation system.

An effective water safety plan also covers such matters as training, record-keeping, communication among staff, contingency plans, and management responsibilities. The format and content of the plan may be prescribed by public health laws or regulations. To inform the water safety plan, the undertaking of a site specific legionella risk assessment is often recommended in the first instance. The legionella risk assessment identifies the hazards, the level of risk they pose and provides recommendations of control measures to put in place within the overarching water safety plan.

== Treatment ==
Effective antibiotics include most macrolides, tetracyclines, ketolides, and quinolones. Legionella spp. multiply within the cell, so any effective treatment must have excellent intracellular penetration. Current treatments of choice are the respiratory tract quinolones (levofloxacin, moxifloxacin, gemifloxacin) or newer macrolides (azithromycin, clarithromycin, roxithromycin).

Macrolides (azithromycin) are used in all age groups, while tetracyclines (doxycycline) are prescribed for children above the age of 12 and quinolones (levofloxacin) above the age of 18. Rifampicin can be used in combination with a quinolone or macrolide. Whether rifampicin is an effective antibiotic to take for treatment is uncertain. The Infectious Diseases Society of America does not recommend the use of rifampicin with added regimens. Tetracyclines and erythromycin led to improved outcomes compared to other antibiotics in the original American Legion outbreak. These antibiotics are effective because they have excellent intracellular penetration in Legionella-infected cells. The recommended treatment is 5–10 days of levofloxacin or 3–5 days of azithromycin, but in people who are immunocompromised, have severe disease, or other pre-existing health conditions, longer antibiotic use may be necessary. During outbreaks, prophylactic antibiotics have been used to prevent Legionnaires' disease in high-risk individuals who have possibly been exposed.

The mortality at the original American Legion convention in 1976 was high (29 deaths in 182 infected individuals) because the antibiotics used (including penicillins, cephalosporins, and aminoglycosides) had poor intracellular penetration. Mortality has plunged to less than 5% if therapy is started quickly. Delay in giving the appropriate antibiotic leads to higher mortality.

== Prognosis ==
The fatality rate of Legionnaires' disease has ranged from 5–30% during various outbreaks and approaches 50% for nosocomial infections, especially when treatment with antibiotics is delayed. Hospital-acquired Legionella pneumonia has a fatality rate of 28%, and the principal source of infection in such cases is the drinking-water distribution system.

== Epidemiology ==
Legionnaires' disease acquired its name in July 1976, when an outbreak of pneumonia occurred among people attending a convention of the American Legion at the Bellevue-Stratford Hotel in Philadelphia. Of the 182 reported cases, mostly men, 29 died. On 18 January 1977, the causative agent was identified as a previously unknown strain of bacteria, subsequently named Legionella, and the species that caused the outbreak was named Legionella pneumophila. Following this discovery, unexplained outbreaks of severe respiratory disease from the 1950s were retrospectively attributed to Legionella. Legionnaires' disease also became a prominent historical example of an emerging infectious disease.

Outbreaks of Legionnaires' disease receive significant media attention, but this disease usually occurs in single, isolated cases not associated with any recognized outbreak. When outbreaks do occur, they are usually in the summer and early autumn, though cases may occur at any time of year. Most infections occur in those who are middle-aged or older. National surveillance systems and research studies were established early, and in recent years, improved ascertainment and changes in clinical methods of diagnosis have contributed to an upsurge in reported cases in many countries. Environmental studies continue to identify novel sources of infection, leading to regular revisions of guidelines and regulations. About 8,000 to 18,000 cases of Legionnaires' disease occur each year in the United States, according to the Bureau of Communicable Disease Control.

Between 1995 and 2005, over 32,000 cases of Legionnaires' disease and more than 600 outbreaks were reported to the European Working Group for Legionella Infections. The data on Legionella are limited in developing countries, and Legionella-related illnesses likely are underdiagnosed worldwide. Improvements in diagnosis and surveillance in developing countries would be expected to reveal far higher levels of morbidity and mortality than are currently recognised. Similarly, improved diagnosis of human illness related to Legionella species and serogroups other than Legionella pneumophila would improve knowledge about their incidence and spread.

A 2011 study successfully used modeling to predict the likely number of cases during Legionnaires' outbreaks based on symptom onset dates from past outbreaks. In this way, the eventual likely size of an outbreak can be predicted, enabling efficient and effective use of public-health resources in managing an outbreak.

During the COVID-19 pandemic, some researchers and organisations raised concerns about the impact of the COVID-19 lockdowns on Legionnaire's disease outbreaks. Additionally, at least two people in England died from a co-infection of Legionella and SARS-CoV-2.

=== Outbreaks ===
An outbreak is defined as two or more cases where the onset of illness is closely linked in time (weeks rather than months) and space, where a suspicion or evidence exists of a common source of infection, with or without microbiological support (i.e. common spatial location of cases from travel history).

- In April 1985, 175 people in Stafford, England, were admitted to the District or Kingsmead Stafford Hospitals with chest infection or pneumonia. A total of 28 people died. Medical diagnosis showed that Legionnaires' disease was responsible and the immediate epidemiological investigation traced the source of the infection to the air-conditioning cooling tower on the roof of Stafford District Hospital.
- In March 1999, a large outbreak in the Netherlands occurred during the Westfriese Flora flower exhibition in Bovenkarspel; 318 people became ill and at least 32 people died. This was the second-deadliest outbreak since the 1976 outbreak and possibly the deadliest, as several people were buried before Legionnaires' disease had been diagnosed.
- The world's largest outbreak of Legionnaires' disease happened in July 2001, with people appearing at the hospital on 7 July, in Murcia, Spain. More than 800 suspected cases were recorded by the time the last case was treated on 22 July; 636–696 of these cases were estimated and 449 confirmed (so, at least 16,000 people were exposed to the bacterium) and six died, a case-fatality rate around 1%.
- In September 2005, 127 residents of a nursing home in Canada became ill with L. pneumophila. Within a week, 21 of the residents had died. Culture results at first were negative, which is not unusual, as L. pneumophila is a "fastidious" bacterium, meaning it requires specific nutrients, living conditions, or both to grow. The source of the outbreak was traced to the air-conditioning cooling towers on the nursing home's roof.
- In August 2012, an outbreak in lower Quebec City, Canada from contaminated water in a cooling tower resulted in 180 infections and 13 resulting deaths.
- In November 2014, 302 people were hospitalized following an outbreak of legionellosis in Portugal, and seven related deaths were reported. All cases emerged in three civil parishes from the municipality of Vila Franca de Xira in the northern outskirts of Lisbon, and were treated in hospitals of the greater Lisbon area. The source is suspected to be located in the cooling towers of the fertilizer plant Fertibéria.
- Twelve people were diagnosed with the disease in an outbreak in the Bronx, New York, in December 2014; the source was traced to contaminated cooling towers at a housing development. In July and August 2015, another, unrelated outbreak in the Bronx killed 12 people and made about 120 people sick; the cases arose from a cooling tower on top of a hotel. At the end of September, another person died of the disease and 13 were sickened in yet another unrelated outbreak in the Bronx. The cooling towers from which the people were infected in the latter outbreak had been cleaned during the summer outbreak, raising concerns about how well the bacteria could be controlled.
- On 28 August 2015, an outbreak of Legionnaire's disease was detected at San Quentin State Prison in Northern California; 81 people were sickened and the cause was sludge that had built up in cooling towers.
- Between June 2015 and January 2016, 87 cases of Legionnaires' disease were reported by the Michigan Department of Health and Human Services for the city of Flint, Michigan, and surrounding areas. The outbreak may have been linked to the Flint water crisis, in which the city's water source was changed to a cheaper and inadequately treated source. Ten of those cases were fatal.
- In November 2017, an outbreak was detected at Hospital de São Francisco Xavier, Lisbon, Portugal, with up to 53 people being diagnosed with the disease and five of them dying from it.
- In Quincy, Illinois, at the Illinois Veterans Home, a 2015 outbreak of the disease killed 12 people and sickened more than 50 others. It was believed to be caused by infected water supply. Three more cases were identified by November 2017.
- In the autumn of 2017, 22 cases were reported in a Legionnaires' disease outbreak at Disneyland in Anaheim, California. It was believed to have been caused by a cooling tower that releases mist for the comfort of visitors. The contaminated droplets likely spread to the people in and beyond the park.
- In July 2019, 11 former guests of the Sheraton Atlanta hotel were diagnosed with the disease, with 55 additional probable cases.
- In September 2019, 141 visitors to the Western North Carolina Mountain State Fair were diagnosed with Legionnaires' disease, with four reported deaths, after a hot tub exhibit is suspected to have developed and spread the bacteria. At least one additional exposure apparently occurred during the Asheville Quilt Show that took place a few weeks after the fair in the same building where the hot tub exhibit was held. The building had been sanitized after the outbreak.
- In December 2019, the government of Western Australia's Department of Health was notified of four cases of Legionnaires' disease. Those exposed had recently visited near Bali's Ramayana Resort and Spa in central Kuta.
- In February 2024, Minnesota Department of Health issued a news release stating that fourteen (14) cases were identified in Grand Rapids, Minnesota since April 2023 which they attributed to the municipal water supply.
- In January 2024, NSW Health issued an alert for Legionnaires' disease for Sydney CBD. As of 3 January 2024, 7 known cases requiring hospitalization had been reported.
- In late July 2024, at least 22 people across Melbourne contracted legionnaires’ disease – and most of them admitted to hospital with “multiple admissions” to intensive care units due to “severe community acquired pneumonia”. The health department has been investigating the cause of the outbreak, including by testing local cooling towers.
- In August 2025, there was an outbreak in Harlem, NYC, infecting 118 citizens and killing 7 adults. One unregistered and one registered cooling tower system were implicated.
- From 1 May 2024 to 26 September 2024, and 1 May 2025 to 30 September 2025 - there were legionnaires' outbreaks in London, Ontario, Canada.
- In July 2026, New York City health officials are investigating an outbreak of Legionnaires’ disease on the Upper East Side that has resulted in at least 59 confirmed cases and 48 hospitalizations, with environmental sampling underway at most rooftop cooling towers in the affected area as authorities work to identify the source.
