= Carolyn Rovee-Collier =

American psychologist, academic and educator

- Born: Carolyn Kent; April 7, 1942; Nashville, Tennessee, U.S.
- Died: October 2, 2014 (aged 72); Stockton, New Jersey, U.S.
- Education: Louisiana State University (BA); Brown University (ScM); Brown University (PhD)
- Known for: Infant Learning and Memory
- Awards: The Howard Crosby Warren Medal (2003)
- Scientific career
- Fields: Psychology
- Workplaces: Trenton State College; Rutgers University; Columbia University
- Doctoral advisor: Trygg Engen

Carolyn Rovee-Collier (née Kent; April 7, 1942 – October 2, 2014) was a professor of psychology at Rutgers University. Born in Nashville, Tennessee, she was a pioneer and an internationally renowned expert in cognitive development. She was named one of the 10 most influential female graduates of Brown University. The International Society for Developmental Psychobiology awards the Rovee-Collier Mentor Award in her honor.

== Biography ==
Carolyn Kent was born in Nashville, Tennessee and grew up in Baton Rouge, Louisiana. She attended Louisiana State University (LSU), where her father, George Kent, was a professor of zoology. She graduated in 1962 with a bachelor's degree in psychology. She obtained her master's degree in 1964 and her Ph.D. in experimental child psychology from Brown University in 1966. She taught at Trenton University and then Rutgers university, where she was on the faculty for 43 years until her death on October 2, 2014, aged 72, following a long struggle with multiple sclerosis and breast cancer, at her Stockton, New Jersey home.

== Research ==
Rovee-Collier was recognized as the founder of infant long-term memory research. Her research focused on learning and memory in pre-verbal infants. In her research, she used operant and deferred imitation procedures to study latent learning, and how memory retrieval affects future retention. Rovee-Collier had authored 200 articles and chapters and a 2001 book (with Hayne and Colombo), The development of implicit and explicit memory, and received recognition for her research accomplishments from various organizations.

== Awards ==
Rovee-Collier received a 10-year NIMH MERIT award. Recipients of these awards are nominated by members of the National Institute of Mental Health, and made to investigators who have demonstrated superior competence and outstanding productivity in their research.

In 2003, she received the Howard Crosby Warren Medal —the most prestigious award in American psychology, according to the Federation of Associations in Behavioral & Brain Sciences. She also received a James McKeen Cattell Fellowship and a Distinguished Achievement Medal from the Graduate School of Brown University.

== Marriages ==
- 1) David Thomas Rovee (divorced 1975); 2 sons, Benjamin and Christopher; 2 grandsons, Julian and Zachary Rovee
- 2) George Collier (1977-2014; her death); stepsons George, Jon and James Collier

== Selected works ==
- Rovee-Collier, C. (1995). Time windows in cognitive development. Developmental Psychology, 31(2), 147–169.
- Rovee-Collier, C. (1997). Dissociations in infant memory: Rethinking the development of implicit and explicit memory. Psychological Review, 104(3), 467–498.
- Rovee-Collier, C., Griesler, P. C., & Earley, L. A. (1985). Contextual determinants of retrieval in three-month-old infants. Learning and Motivation, 16(2), 139–157.
- Rovee-Collier, C. K., Hayne, H., & Colombo, M. (2001). The development of implicit and explicit memory. John Benjamins Publishing.
- Rovee-Collier, C. K., & Sullivan, M. W. (1980). Organization of infant memory. Journal of Experimental Psychology: Human Learning and Memory, 6(6), 798–807.
- Rovee-Collier, C. K., Sullivan, M. W., Enright, M., Lucas, D., & Fagen, J. W. (1980). Reactivation of infant memory. Science, 208(4448), 1159–1161.
