= Helen Nicholson (medical academic) =

New Zealand physician

Vice-Chancellor of the University of Otago
- Acting; March 2023 – June 2024
- Chancellor: Stephen Higgs
- Preceded by: David Murdoch
- Succeeded by: Grant Robertson
- Scientific career
- Education: University of Bristol
- Fields: male reproductive health
- Workplaces: University of Otago

Helen Nicholson is a New Zealand medical academic specialising in male reproductive health. She is a full professor and served as Acting Vice-Chancellor of the University of Otago between March 2023 and June 2024.

== Academic career ==
After a 1986 MD from the University of Bristol, Nicholson worked at that institution before moving to the University of Otago as full professor in 2000. Before becoming Deputy Vice-Chancellor, she previously held positions as the head of the Department of Anatomy, Dean of the School of Medical Sciences, and Pro Vice-Chancellor (International).

Nicholson's speciality is male reproductive health, including prostate health. She also holds administrative roles and international outreach roles at a national and international level.

A 2016 study on medical students operating on themselves and each other gained international attention.

In March 2023, Nicholson took charge of the University of Otago as acting Vice-Chancellor after Vice-Chancellor David Murdoch took sick leave. After Murdoch resigned as Vice-Chancellor in mid-June 2023, Nicholson continued in her position as acting Vice-Chancellor until a permanent replacement was found following a "global search." In July 2024, Hon Grant Robertson took over as Vice-Chancellor.

== Selected works ==
- Nicholson, Helen D., R. W. Swann, G. D. Burford, D. Claire Wathes, D. G. Porter, and B. T. Pickering. "Identification of oxytocin and vasopressin in the testis and in adrenal tissue." Regulatory peptides 8, no. 2 (1984): 141–146.
- Thackare, Hemlata, Helen D. Nicholson, and Kate Whittington. "Oxytocin—its role in male reproduction and new potential therapeutic uses." Human Reproduction Update 12, no. 4 (2006): 437–448.
- Frayne, J., and H. D. Nicholson. "Localization of oxytocin receptors in the human and macaque monkey male reproductive tracts: evidence for a physiological role of oxytocin in the male." Molecular human reproduction 4, no. 6 (1998): 527–532.
- Frayne, Janet, and Helen D. Nicholson. "Effect of oxytocin on testosterone production by isolated rat Leydig cells is mediated via a specific oxytocin receptor." Biology of Reproduction 52, no. 6 (1995): 1268–1273.
