= Annegret Mündermann =

Annegret Mündermann is a German researcher at the Schulthess Clinic Zurich and at the Department of Biomedical Engineering at the University of Basel. She is an adjunct professor in the field of Regenerative Medicine & Biomechanics.

Her main research focus lies in outcome research in orthopaedics and on the impact of biomechanics in the development and progression of osteoarthritis and the accompanying diagnosis and treatment of the musculoskeletal system.

She is a member of various national and international societies in the fields of biomechanics and osteoarthritis, including the International Society of Biomechanics, European Society of Biomechanics, the German Society of Clinical Movement Science and the Osteoarthritis Research Society International. From 2013 to 2024, she was a board member of the German Society of Biomechanics (DGfB), where she served as Secretary General, and she has been part of the Board Nominating Committee, Award and Nomination Committee, Research and Training Committee of the Osteoarthritis Research Society International (OARSI) since 2023.

== Academic career ==
After she studied sports and mathematics at the University of Konstanz, she completed here PhD at the University of Calgary in Medical Science/ Biomechanics. After stations in the USA, Canada and New Zealand, she got her habilitation (Venia Legendi) from the University of Konstanz in 2010, where she taught as a PD until 2016. In that year, she was re-habiliitated to the University of Basel (Venia Docendi). Since 2018, she holds an adjunct professorship at the medical faculty of the University of Basel. Since 2025, she is the Chair of Research and Head of the Department of Teaching, Research and Development at the Schulthess Klinik.

== Scientific impact ==
With over 400 peer-reviewed articles, an h-index of 44 and over 10,000 citations, she has a major impact on the communities in her fields of research.

== Prizes and awards ==
Mündermann won various awards and was rewarded for her research, her presentations, as well as her overall work:

- In 1992, she won the Aesculap Award (Aesculap AG & Co. KG).
- In 2003, she was the runner up for the Young Investigator Award of the Technical Group on Footwear Biomechanics from the International Society of Biomechanics and the Clinical Biomechanics Award from the American Society of Biomechanics.
- in 2003 she won the Governor General's Gold Medal Award (Best PhD Thesis) at the Department of Medical Science of the University of Calgary.
- In 2005 she won the 3rd Price from the Promising Young Investigator Award of the International Society of Biomechanics.
- In 2006, she was again runner up for the Clinical Biomechanics Award of the American Society of Biomechanics.
- In 2007, she again won the 3rd Price from the Promising Young Investigator Award of the International Society of Biomechanics and was Featured Female Scientist of the American Society of Biomechanics.
- In 2014, she won the Best Paper Award from the German Society of Biomechanics.
- in 2015, she was runner up for the Maurice E. Müller Award (Swiss Orthopaedics).
- In 2023, she was runner up for the Best Presentation Award at the DJO GLOBAL from the Society of Traumatology and Orthopaedics in Sports (GOTS), Runner up.
