= Maria Deloria Knoll =

American epidemiologist

Maria Deloria Knoll is an expert in the fields of epidemiology, disease surveillance, vaccine trial conduct, and biostatistics. She currently serves as associate director of Science at the International Vaccine Access Center (IVAC), an organization dedicated to accelerating global access to life-saving vaccines, at the Johns Hopkins Bloomberg School of Public Health in Baltimore, Maryland.

== Education ==
Maria Deloria Knoll completed her undergraduate studies in biostatistics at the University of North Carolina at Chapel Hill. She received her PhD in epidemiology from the Johns Hopkins Bloomberg School of Public Health in Baltimore, Maryland.

== Research ==
Knoll's research interests include the epidemiology of vaccine-preventable infectious diseases and the methodological issues of the design, conduct and analysis of epidemiological studies and clinical trials. Her current projects include:

- The PERCH study to determine the causes of pneumonia in settings representative of developing countries to guide the development of new pneumonia vaccines.
- For 2015 onward, treatment algorithms estimating the burden and serotype distribution of pneumococcal and meningococcal disease among children and adults, measuring the impact on disease burden of pneumococcal conjugate vaccine use in Kenya and The Gambia, and evaluating the value of antigen-based diagnostic tests in blood to improve sensitivity of pneumococcal detection in pneumonia patients.

Knoll has over 20 years of experience in the design, conduct, and analysis of clinical trials and epidemiological studies. She spent 13 years at the National Institute of Health's National Institute of Allergy and Infectious Diseases and her clinical trials experience there included close working relationships with many large and mid-sized vaccine manufacturers. Knoll also served as a Research Assistant Professor at Northwestern University's Department of Preventive Medicine in Chicago, Illinois, where she directed a course on clinical trial design, conduct and analysis in their MPH program, conducted cardiovascular and HIV-related epidemiological studies using data from established cohorts, and designed therapeutic clinical trials for the Rehabilitation Institute of Chicago. She has written many well cited original articles and is regularly an invited speaker to various international health conferences.

=== The Pneumococcal Conjugate Vaccine Introduction Study (PCVIS) in The Gambia and Kenya ===
The GAVI Alliance and the Bill & Melinda Gates Foundation are funding two pneumococcal conjugate vaccine (PCV) impact studies in the Gambia and Kenya. In 2006, these projects were identified as critical to GAVI's objectives of generating sustainable PCV introduction. These studies, funded through the Pneumococcal Vaccines Accelerated Development and Introduction Plan (PneumoADIP), a project of IVAC at The Johns Hopkins Bloomberg School of Public Health (JHSPH), provide the earliest possible opportunity to document the health impact of routine use of PCVs in developing countries.

== Awards ==
- National Institutes of Health Merit Award (1999,1991)
- Food and Drug Administration Commissioner's Special Citation Group Award (1997)
- U.S. Department of Health and Human Services Secretary's Group Award for Distinguished Service (1996)
- U.S. Department of Health and Human Services Special Achievement Award (1995,1991)
