= Eirian Jones =

Plant pathologist in New Zealand

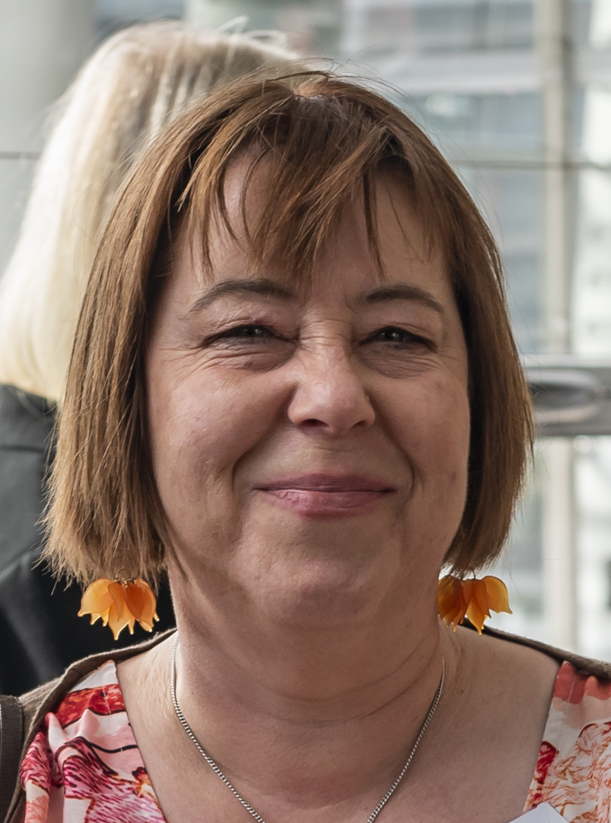
- Jones in 2020
- Born: Elizabeth Eirian Jones

Academic background
- Education: University of Edinburgh

Elisabeth Eirian Jones is a New Zealand phytopathologist, and a full professor at Lincoln University, specialising in sustainable control strategies for cropping industries.

== Academic career ==
After a BSc(Hons) at the Manchester Metropolitan University, Jones completed a PhD titled Comparative behaviour of mycoparasitic Pythium species at the University of Edinburgh. Jones then moved to the University of Warwick, before being appointed to Lincoln University in New Zealand. She was promoted to full professor in 2022.

Her main research focus is on plant pathogens, particularly woody trunk and root pathogens in horticultural crops such as grapevines. She is part of the Bioprotection Aotearoa Centre of Research Excellence based at Lincoln University.

Jones has been President of the New Zealand Plant Protection Society.

The standard author abbreviation E.E.Jones is used to indicate this person as the author when citing a botanical name.

== Selected works ==
- Shengjing Shi; Alan E Richardson; O'Callaghan, Maureen; DeAngelis, Kristen; Jones, Eirian E.; Stewart, Alison; Firestone, Mary Kathryn; Condron, Leo M. (2011). "Effects of selected root exudate components on soil bacterial communities". FEMS Microbiology Ecology. 77 (3): 600–610. doi:10.1111/j.1574-6941.2011.01150.x. PMID 21658090. Wikidata Q61155963.
- T de Vrije; N Antoine; R M Buitelaar; et al. (2001). "The fungal biocontrol agent Coniothyrium minitans: production by solid-state fermentation, application and marketing". Applied Microbiology and Biotechnology. 56 (1–2): 58–68. doi:10.1007/s002530100678. PMID 11499948. Wikidata Q34333787.
- Jones, Eirian E.; A. Mead; J. M. Whipps (2004). "Effect of inoculum type and timing of application of Coniothyrium minitans on Sclerotinia sclerotiorum: control of sclerotinia disease in glasshouse lettuce". Plant Pathology. 53 (5): 611–620. doi:10.1111/j.1365-3059.2004.01071.x. Wikidata Q58055490.
