= Legionella longbeachae =

Scientific classification
- Domain: Bacteria
- Kingdom: Pseudomonadati
- Phylum: Pseudomonadota
- Class: Gammaproteobacteria
- Order: Legionellales
- Family: Legionellaceae
- Genus: Legionella
- Species: L. longbeachae

Binomial name
- Legionella longbeachae McKinney et al. 1982

Species of bacterium

Legionella longbeachae is one species of the family Legionellaceae. It was first isolated from a patient in Long Beach, California. It is found predominantly in potting soil and compost. Human infection from L. longbeachae is particularly common in Australia, but cases have been documented in other countries including the United States, Japan, Greece and the UK.

Like other Legionella species, person-to-person transmission has not been documented, but unlike other species, the primary transmission mode has not been proven, but likely is inhalation or aspiration of dust from contaminated compost or soil that contains the organism causing legionellosis.

Modes of transmission include poor hand-washing practices after gardening, long-term smoking, and being near dripping, hanging flower pots. Awareness of a possible health risk with potting mix protected against illness. Inhalation and ingestion are possible modes of transmission. Exposure to aerosolized organisms and poor gardening hygiene may be important predisposing factors to L. longbeachae infection.

== Compost and potting mix warning labels ==
Genomic information
- NCBI ID: 450
- Ploidy: haploid
- Genome size: 4.14 Mb
- Number of chromosomes: 1
- Year of completion: 2009

Compost must be handled with care, damped down with water to reduce dust before handling, and use of a face mask covering the nose and mouth to reduce the risk of inhaling the dust is needed, especially for those at high risk from infection.

Studies advocate the introduction of an industry standard that ensures the use of face masks when handling potting mix and attaching masks and warning labels to potting mix bags sold to the public.

Compost packaging in Australia has an L. longbeachae warning label. The New South Wales state government recommends that people reduce exposure to potting mix dust by following the manufacturers' warning present on potting mix labels, including:

- Wetting down the potting mix to reduce the dust
- Wearing gloves and a P2 mask when using potting mix
- Washing hands after handling potting mix or soil, and before eating, drinking or smoking

== Symptoms ==
Early symptoms include fever, chills, headache, shortness of breath, sometimes dry cough, and muscle aches and pain.

Most people who breathe in the bacteria do not become ill. The risk of disease is increased with increased age and smoking, and in people with weakened immune systems.
