= Jackie Benschop =

New Zealand professor of veterinary public health

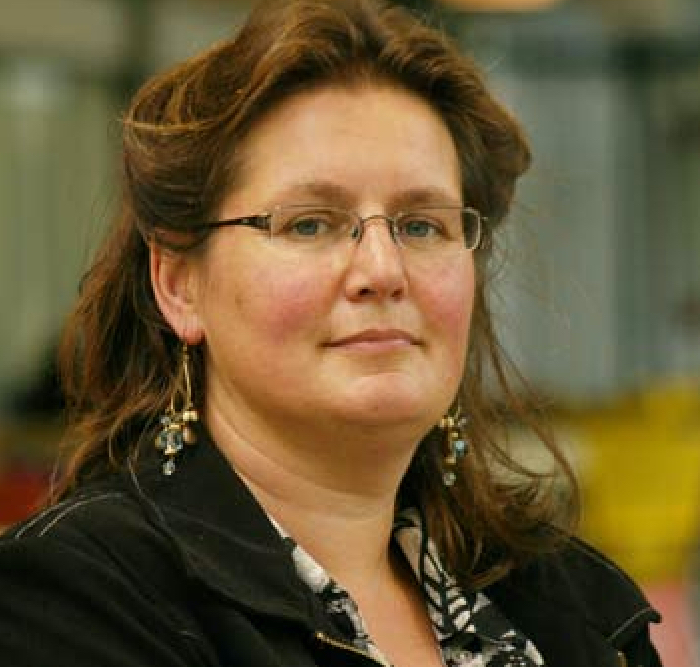
- Benschop 2008

Academic background
- Education: Massey University
- Thesis: Epidemiological investigations of surveillance strategies of zoonotic Salmonella (2009)
- Doctoral advisor: Nigel French, Roger Morris, Mark Stevenson

Jackie Benschop is a New Zealand Professor of Veterinary Public Health at Massey University, specialising in the animal–human–environment interface, particularly for Leptospira, Campylobacter and Salmonella. She is a member of the World Health Organisation's Steering Committee for the Global Leptospirosis Environmental Action Network, and a co-founder of the African Leptospirosis Network.

== Academic career ==
Benschop completed a PhD titled 'Epidemiological investigations of surveillance strategies of zoonotic Salmonella' at Massey University in 2009. Benschop then joined the Massey faculty, where she is co-director of the Molecular Epidemiology and Public Health Laboratory. She was promoted to full professor from 1 January 2021.

Benschop is a global expert on zoonotic diseases. Her particular specialty is diseases transmitted via food or in occupational settings. From 2009 to 2011, she led a FRST-funded project on infectious diseases and climate variation, and in 2009 was appointed to a conjoint position with ESR. She has worked on leptospirosis in work settings, including abattoirs and farms, and is a member of the World Health Organisation's Steering Committee for the Global Leptospirosis Environmental Action Network. Benschop is a co-founder of the African Leptospirosis Network, which supports African scientists through a range of activities, including mentoring, outbreak identification, access to scientific literature and PhD student opportunities at Massey.

In 2016, Benschop received a C. Alma Baker Trust Fellowship to travel to the UK, where she was hosted by Profesor Ruth Zadoks and Drs Kathryn Allan and Jo Halliday at the Institute of Biodiversity, Animal Health and Comparative Medicine at the University of Glasgow.

== Selected works ==
- Benschop, Jacqueline; Heuer, Cord; Patricia Jaros; Collins, Julie M.; Anne Midwinter; Peter Wilson (2009). "Sero-prevalence of leptospirosis in workers at a New Zealand slaughterhouse". The New Zealand Medical Journal. 122 (1307): 39–47. PMID 20148043. Wikidata Q82861470.
- Benschop, Jacqueline; Stevenson, Mark; Dahl J; French, Nigel Peter (2007). "Towards incorporating spatial risk analysis for Salmonella sero-positivity into the Danish swine surveillance programme". Preventive Veterinary Medicine. 83 (3–4): 347–359. doi:10.1016/j.prevetmed.2007.09.005. PMID 18006166. Wikidata Q50066729.
- Bloomfield, Samuel; Benschop, Jacqueline; Biggs, Patrick Jon; Marshall, Jonathan Craig; Hayman, David Thomas Stuart; Philip E Carter; Anne C Midwinter; Alison E Mather; French, Nigel Peter (2017). "Genomic Analysis of Salmonella enterica Serovar Typhimurium DT160 Associated with a 14-Year Outbreak, New Zealand, 1998-2012". Emerging Infectious Diseases. 23 (6): 906–913. doi:10.3201/eid2306.161934. PMC 5443446. PMID 28516864. Wikidata Q40197260.
- Phan Q Minh; Roger S Morris; Birgit Schauer; Stevenson, Mark; Benschop, Jacqueline; Hoang V Nam; Ron Jackson (2009). "Spatio-temporal epidemiology of highly pathogenic avian influenza outbreaks in the two deltas of Vietnam during 2003-2007". Preventive Veterinary Medicine. 89 (1–2): 16–24. doi:10.1016/j.prevetmed.2009.01.004. PMID 19232765. Wikidata Q40000986.
- Vanina Guernier; Goarant, Cyrille; Benschop, Jacqueline; Colleen L. Lau (2018). "A systematic review of human and animal leptospirosis in the Pacific Islands reveals pathogen and reservoir diversity". PLoS Neglected Tropical Diseases. 12 (5) e0006503. doi:10.1371/journal.pntd.0006503. PMC 5967813. PMID 29758037. Wikidata Q55185278.
